= Iskandar Malaysia Bus Rapid Transit =

Proposed BRT system in Johor, Malaysia

Iskandar Rapid Transit
- BRT
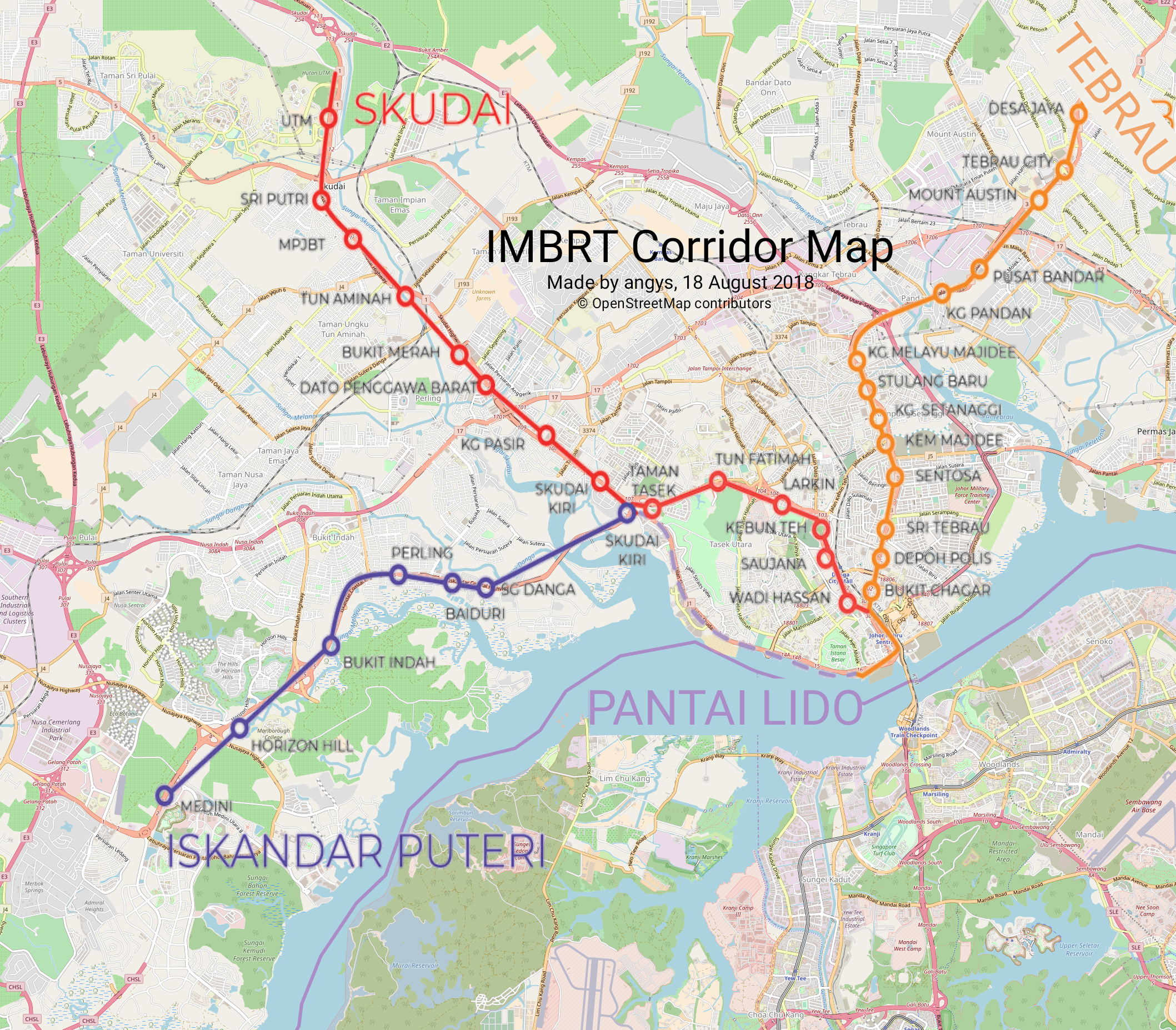

Overview
- Native name: Transit Aliran Bas Iskandar Malaysia (Malay)
- Locale: Iskandar Malaysia - Johor Bahru District, Kulai District, and Pontian District (South)
- Transit type: Bus rapid transit
- Number of lines: 72 (3 trunk, 26 direct, and 42 feeder BRT route)
- Website: https://imbrt.com.my

Operation
- Operation will start: Shelved
- Operators: 111 Handal Indah (Causeway Link); 227 Maju; 007 S&S International; 168 Transit Link (City Bus)
- Number of vehicles: Articulated 18m ( Trunk route), 12m bus (Direct route) and 8m bus (Feeder route)

Technical
- System length: 51 km (32 mi) First Phase

The Iskandar Malaysia Bus Rapid Transit (IMBRT) was a planned bus rapid transit system to be built in and around Iskandar Malaysia, Johor, Malaysia. It would have consist of trunk, direct, and feeder bus rapid transit corridors. The project was cancelled in 2024 due to insufficient capacity to handle projected traffic.

The development was modelled using Australia's Brisbane BRT.

== History ==
As the population of Iskandar Malaysia was expected to grow double in 2025 from 1.5 million people when it was established in 2006, IMBRT was proposed to cater the transportation needs for the residents in the area. This led to the first conceptualization of the project in 2009 that aimed to combine the speed and reliability of the light rail transit (LRT) with the affordability of a conventional bus system. The concept aimed to use high-capacity buses shuttling along the dedicated bus lanes on three main routes connecting Johor Bahru to industries and residential areas in Tebrau, universities and small and medium-sized enterprises in Skudai and new growth areas in Nusajaya. The buses will be air-conditioned with Wi-Fi on board that run on clean energy at regular intervals, cutting waiting and travelling times for commuters while reducing pollution and traffic jams.

=== Project launch ===
Late March 2016, the IMBRT project received a green light from the government and expected to take off on 2017. The project was set to be done in three phases with the first phase scheduled to complete in 2021. Once completed, the BRT system was expected cover almost 90% of Iskandar Malaysia, up from the then 39% coverage.

On 7 October 2017, the project was launched by the then Malaysia's Prime Minister Najib Razak at the Progressive Johor Expo in Kota Iskandar. The BRT system was set to be developed at a cost of RM2.56 billion that would be funded by the Federal government for RM1 billion while the remaining funds would be financed through public-private partnership initiative. The system was said to have the elements of light rail transit or metro that would make it quicker than regular bus services. The prime minister ensured that the BRT system would be linked to the Rapid Transit System (RTS), the High Speed Rail (HSR) and intercity bus service. The project was then expected to be operational by 2021 and have a route spanning 51 km and 39 stations.

=== Progress (2017-2024) ===
The public inspection for the project was started in November 2017 to get the feedback from the public and continued to 2018 along with development planning, land acquisitions and stations design to focus throughout the year. The routes were later updated to span over 300 km, of which 50 km were trunk routes while the rest would be feeder routes. The construction work was set to start on the first quarter on 2021 while the completion date for the first phase was push back to end of 2021.

Upon the change of government due to 2018 general election, the new Pakatan Harapan state government confirmed that they are still committed to continuing the project and be given due priority by the Federal government with Johor Bahru-Kota Iskandar to be first route considered for implementation. As of Mar 2021, the construction was again pushed back to the first quarter 2022 with the service to start on 2023.

As the vehicle of the project arrived in January 2021, the bus pilot testing programme of the system set to be launched on 8 April 2021. They will pass by Horizon Hills and Anjung in Medini.

As of September 2023, "Package 1" of the BRT route on the Sultan Iskandar Highway (Iskandar Puteri corridor) is supposed to begin construction in November 2023, and the other package in late 2023/early 2024, and the first phase is scheduled to open in the third quarter of 2025 with 22 stations.

=== Cancellation and replacement ART program ===
However, Mohamad Fazli Mohamad Salleh, the chairman of the Johor state works, transportation, infrastructure, and communications committee, announced in May 2024 that the government had cancelled the IRT/IMBRT project after eight years of planning because it was "unable to overcome traffic congestion, interferes with the efficiency of the bus service and affects traffic flow." Additionally, he stated that it was then determined that, in order to determine which form of public transportation would be best for Iskandar Malaysia, a feasibility and viability study comparing the bus rapid transit, autonomous rapid transit (ART), and light rail transit (LRT) systems should be conducted. Two consortiums submitted their respective LRT and ART proposals to the secretary-general of the Ministry of Economy, and the Johor government endorsed the idea for an Elevated Autonomous Rapid Transit (E-ART) in Johor Bahru to replace the defunct IMBRT project (after considering the now under-construction of RTS Link train line, which is expected to be completed by the end of 2026).

=== Transition to ART and E‑ART ===
The Iskandar Malaysia Bus Rapid Transit (IMBRT) project was subsequently revised into an Automated Rapid Transit (ART) system as part of efforts to enhance capacity and implementation efficiency. The revised concept uses trackless, rubber-tyred vehicles designed to operate at higher capacity compared to conventional bus rapid transit, and was proposed as an alternative to earlier light rail transit (LRT) plans to improve urban mobility in Johor Bahru.

In later planning stages, the system was further developed into an elevated configuration, referred to as the Elevated Autonomous Rapid Transit (E‑ART) system. The elevated design is intended to improve operational reliability and minimise interference with existing road traffic.

The proposed system is planned to serve major corridors within Johor Bahru, including Skudai, Tebrau and Iskandar Puteri, and is expected to be integrated with the Johor Bahru–Singapore Rapid Transit System (RTS) Link at Bukit Chagar.

In early planning stages, the Tebrau corridor was identified as a priority alignment due to its high traffic volume and congestion levels, making it one of the most critical routes for traffic dispersal in Johor Bahru.

The project is being developed under a public-private partnership (PPP) model overseen by the Public Private Partnership Unit (UKAS) of the Prime Minister's Department.

== IMBRT Pilot Testing Programme ==
A three -month pilot testing program was launched on April 8, 2021, in Medini, Iskandar Puteri. As a pilot test, nine bus suppliers were involved in demonstrations of the use of the latest green bus technology that uses electricity or biodiesel. The buses tested ranged in size from 6 meters to 32 meters, and the actual test was held along the route in Iskandar Puteri corridor.

=== Bi-articulated bus for trunk services ===
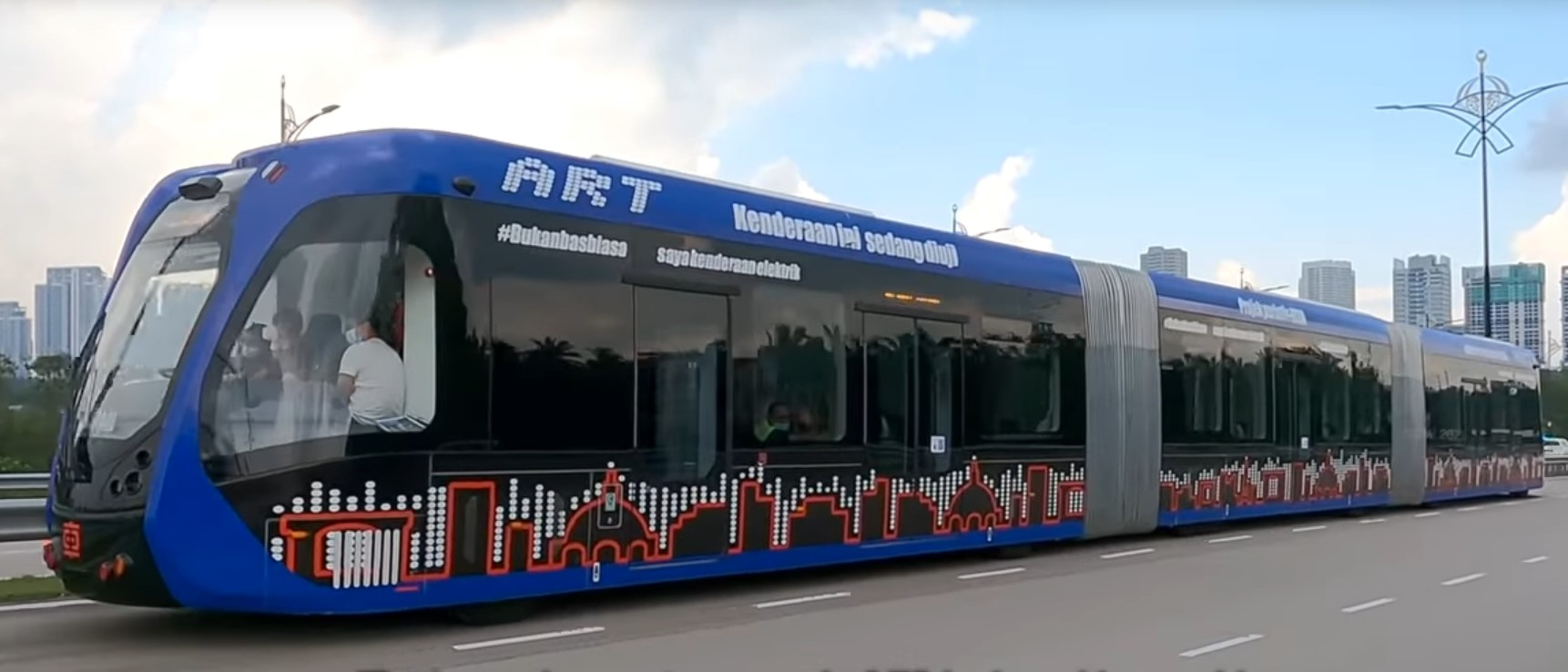
ART on pilot testing programme between Medini Hub to Horizon Hill in April 2021.

In January 2021, a LiDAR guided bi-articulated bus for IMBRT arrived in Johor from China. The guided buses that will be used for this project is an Autonomous Rapid Transit (ART) type that was imported by Mobilus Sdn Bhd, a 51:49 joint venture company established between Eccaz Sdn. Bhd. and CRRC Urban Traffic Co Ltd, a member of CRRC Group. Malaysia will be the first country in the region to potentially adopt this technology.

The ART is a multi-carriages that is equipped with sensors that read the painted tracks marking on the road, enabling it to automatically navigate its own route while travelling up to 70 km per hour and carrying more than 100 passengers per carriages. The capacity of an ART vehicle is expandable to up to five carriages. It is considered as a medium capacity transit system for urban passenger transport using leading edge technology and allows for higher passenger capacity at a lower cost of implementation when compared to traditional light rail systems. During the pilot test, the guided bus used stored energy on electricity to operates. This is to find out the vehicle sustainability to suit on the hot and humid conditions of Malaysian weather.

== Route ==
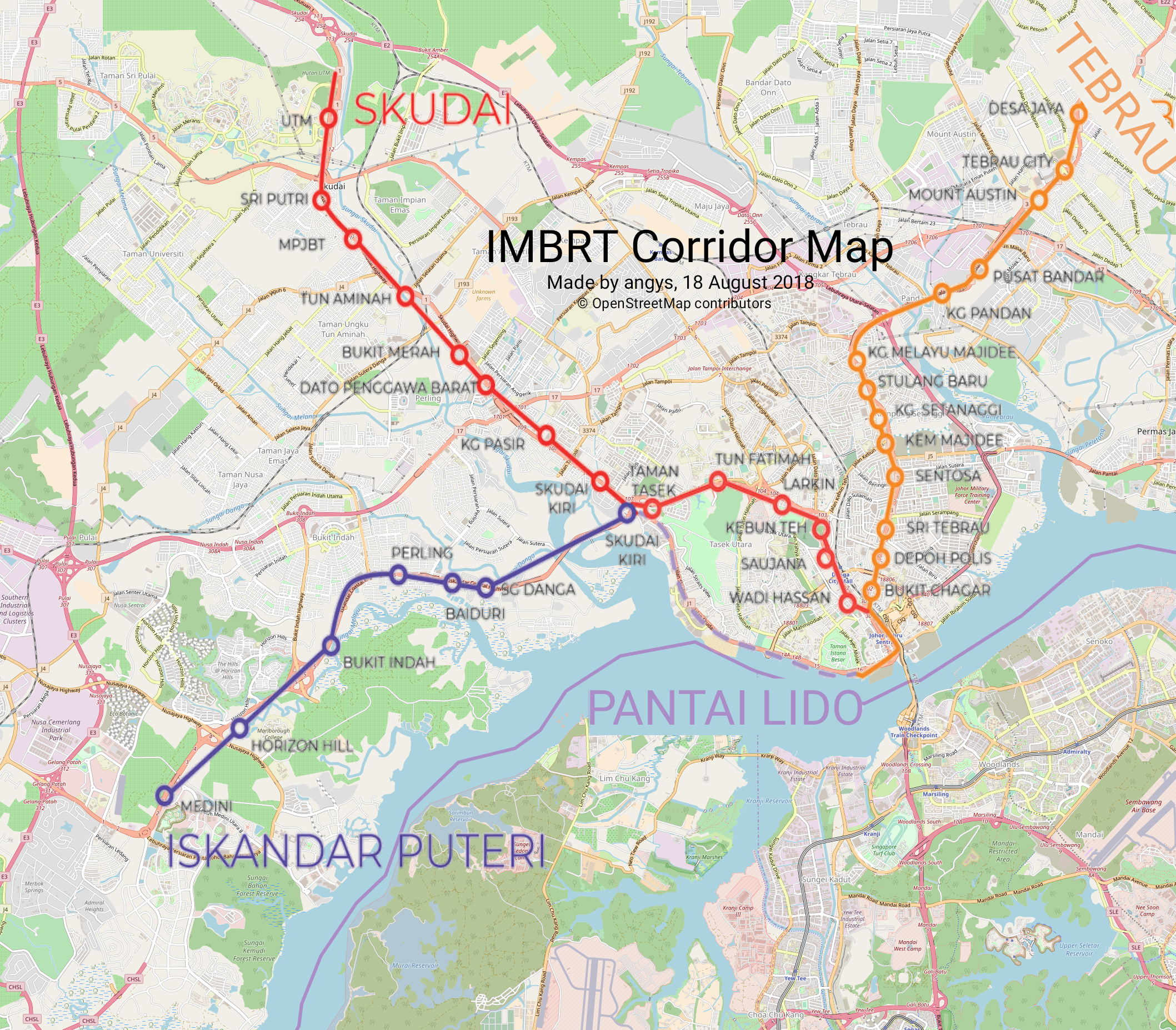
Trunks Service corridors

For the first phase of IMBRT, The Iskandar Regional Development Authority (IRDA) has allocated solar-powered 22 stations on the three BRT lines, comprising 10 stations on Tebrau Line, 8 stations on Skudai Line and 4 stations on Iskandar Puteri Line respectively

=== Trunks service corridors ===
Corridor	Origin – Destination	Proposed Halt	Current Operational Bus Route
Tebrau	Larkin - JB Sentral - Tebrau City	Larkin, Kebun Teh, Saujana, Wadi Hasan, KOMTAR, JB Sentral, Sungai Segget, MBJB, Tun Sri Lanang, Wong Ah Fook Selatan, Wong Ah Fook Utara, Wadi Hana, Depot Polis, Sri Tebrau, Taman Abad, Sentosa, Taman Melodies, Taman Suria, Stulang Baru, Kampung Bendahara, Kampung Melayu Majidee, Taman Sri Pandan, Kampung Pandan, Taman Redang, Pusat Bandar Pandan & Tebrau City.	T10 T11 T13
Skudai	JB Sentral - Sri Putri	JB Sentral, Sungai Segget, MBJB, Taman Istana, Lido Boulevard, Sri Gelam, Straits View South, Straits View, Bukit Serene, Danga Bay Park, Iskandar Malaysia, UDA, Skudai Kanan, Pengkalan Rinting, Kampung Pasir, Pekan Rabu, TD Penggawa Barat, Bukit Mewah, Danga Utama, Tun Aminah, Tun Aminah 2, MBJBT & Sri Putri.	T30 T31 T32
Iskandar Puteri	JB Sentral - Medini	JB Sentral, Sungai Segget, MBJB, Taman Istana, Lido Boulevard, Sri Gelam, Strais View South, Straits View, Bukit Serene, Danga Bay Park, Iskandar Malaysia, Skudai Kiri, Sungai Danga, D'Utama, Baiduri, Perling, Bukit Indah, International Resort, Theme Park, Sungai Melayu, Kota Iskandar, Legoland, Medini & Ledang.	T33 T40

=== Direct service ===
No.	Origin – Destination	Length (km)
1	Bukit Indah – JB	42.93
2	Kota Iskandar – Perling – Bandar Baru UDA	47.06
3	Gelang Patah – Larkin – Permas Jaya Hub	68.2
4	Medini - Larkin – Permas Jaya	51.77
5	Taman Universiti – Mutiara Rini	51.8
6	UTM – Taman Universiti – Medini	54.37
7	UTM Station – Taman Ungku Tun Aminah – Medini	37.95
8	Taman Ungku Tun Aminah - Lima Kedai – Medini	49.11
9	Senai Airport – Bukit Indah – Medini	70.4
10	Kulai – Skudai – Larkin	60.37
11	Pulai – Kempas Sentral	42.86
12	Taman Ungku Tun Aminah – Tampoi – Johor Jaya	63.79
13	Kempas Baru – HAS – JB	33.3
14	Setia Indah – Kempas Baru – Larkin – JB	41.83
15	Kempas Sentral – Medini	55.6
16	Impian Jaya – Kempas Sentral – Larkin Sentral	36.49
17	Terminal Johor Jaya – Permas	38.72
18	Puteri Wangsa – Tebrau – Larkin – JB	47.63
19	Desa Cemerlang – Stulang	47.14
20	Setia Indah – Kebun Teh – Larkin Sentral	34.89
21	Ulu Tiram – Tebrau – Larkin Sentral	40.53
22	Tebrau City – Tampoi – Kempas Sentral	37.24
23	Masai – Seri Alam – Permas Jaya	58.88
24	Kota Masai – Pasir Gudang – JB	68.45
25	Pasir Gudang Terminal – Kempas Sentral	53.96
26	Seri Alam – Permas – Larkin Sentral	36.37

=== Feeder service ===
	Origin – Destination	Length (km)
1	Danga Bay – Saujana – JB	23.81
2	Kg Pasir Station – Bandar Baru Uda – Larkin – Abad – Pelangi – JB	34.08
3	Larkin Sentral – Kg Amin – JB	16.98
4	Pulai Indah – Nusa Perintis – Medini	76.21
5	Pekan Nenas – Gelang Patah – Medini	63.34
6	Kg Maju Jaya – Desa Idaman – Econsave – Senai Airport	27.02
7	Taman Aman – Senai New Village	8.72
8	Ulu Tiram – Senai	46.96
9	Kg Kangkar – Sg Tiram – Ulu Tiram Terminal	32.46
10	Kong Kong – Taman Cendana – Pasir Gudang Terminal	30.28
11	KSAB CIQ – Medini South – Puteri Harbour	42.81
12	Pendas – Tanjung Pelepas – Medini	57.31
13	Pinewood – Medini – Gelang Patah	29.38
14	Medini South – Medini – Sg Melayu	35.23
15	Bukit Indah – Nusa Idaman – Horizon Hills – Medini	26.84
16	Perling Station – Taman Dato’ Penggawa Barat	14.41
17	Taman Universiti	14.89
18	Skudai Baru – Taman Ungku Tun Aminah – Taman Orkid	15.72
19	Penggawa Barat – Dahlia – Desa Rahmat – Kg Pasir Station	11.95
20	Danga Sutera – Selesa Jaya	16.3
21	Kempas – Impian Emas – UTM Terminal	36.83
22	Pulai Ria – Taman Teratai – Sri Pulai – Taman Universiti	19.65
23	Kempas – Taman Johor – Bukit Mewah Station	18.26
24	Taman Suria – Kg Melayu Majidee – Larkin	15.78
25	JPO – Bandar Putera	19
26	Kulai Jaya Terminal – Taman Putri Pulai	11.46
27	Taman Majidee – Taman Melodies – Taman Sentosa – Sri Tebrau – Pelangi Station	21.84
28	Setia Indah – Austin Height – Bandar Dato' Onn – Setia Indah	17.36
29	PPR Sri Stulang – Sentosa	10.82
30	KDSM – Majidee Baru – Kg Bendahara	5.98
31	Bestari Indah – Desa Cemerlang – Desa Jaya Hub	18.79
32	Johor Jaya – Taman Gaya – Desa Jaya Hub	21.37
33	Johor Jaya – Taman Molek – Pandan Station	20.83
34	UNIKL – UITM – Jalan Gunung – Seri Alam Terminal	14.28
35	Flora Height – Cendana – Kg Pasir Gudang Baru – Pasir Gudang Terminal	22.04
36	Permas – Senibong	21.5
37	Seri Alam – Nusa Damai – Pasir Gudang Terminal	19.6
38	PPR Desa Rakyat – Taman Scientex – Taman Cendana – Pasir Gudang – Masai	22.86
39	Kg Pasir Putih – Taman Air Biru – Pasir Gudang – Masai	20.72
40	Kota Masai – Taman Pasir Putih – Pasir Gudang	26.6
41	Pasir Gudang Terminal – Perigi Acheh – Tanjung Langsat	32.75
42	Seri Alam Terminal – Taman Rinting – Megah Ria	14.44

== See also ==
- List of bus routes in Johor Bahru
- List of bus rapid transit systems
- Johor Bahru–Singapore Rapid Transit System
- Kuching Urban Transportation System
- KTM ETS
- Bi-articulated bus
- CRRC Autonomous Rapid Transit
- Bombardier Guided Light Transit
- Van Hool ExquiCity bi-articulated bus
