= Johor State Route J4 =

Road in Malaysia

Johor Route 4
- Jalan Gelang Patah

Major junctions
- North end: Skudai
- FT 1 Skudai Highway; J239 Kota Iskandar Highway; J7 State Route J7; FT 178 Jalan Cabang
- South end: Pendas

Location
- Country: Malaysia
- Primary destinations: Gelang Patah, Tanjung Kupang, Lima Kedai, Mutiara Rini, Taman Ungku Tun Aminah

Highway system
- Highways in Malaysia; Expressways; Federal; State

Johor State Route J4 is a major road in Iskandar Puteri, Johor, Malaysia.

== Junction lists ==
The entire route is located in Johor Bahru District, Johor.

Legend:

- I/C - Interchange, I/S - Intersection, RSA - Rest and service area, OBR - Overhead bridge restaurant, R/R - Restaurant and rest plaza, L/B - Layby, V/P - Vista point, TN - tunnel, T/P - Toll plaza, BR - Bridge
- C - Cloverleaf, S - Stack, T-A - Trumpet-A, T-B - Trumpet-B, DT - Directional-T/Y, SDT - Semi-Directional-T/Y, P-Y - Partial-Y, D - Diamond, P-C - Partial cloverleaf, D-D - Diverging diamond, D-R - Direct ramp

Location	km	mi	Name	Destinations	Notes
Skudai			Skudai	FT 1 Skudai Highway – Kulai, Senai, Senai International Airport, Universiti Teknologi Malaysia (UTM), Pontian, Pasir Gudang, Tampoi, Johor Bahru, Woodlands (Singapore); North–South Expressway Southern Route / AH2 – Kuala Lumpur, Malacca; Jalan Shahbandar 1	Diamond interchange
Skudai			Taman Ungku Tun Aminah	Jalan Ronggeng 4 Jalan Tun Teja	Junctions
Skudai			Mutiara Rini	Jalan Persiaran Mutiara Mas – Mutiara Rini, Taman Universiti	Junctions
Lima Kedai			Lima Kedai		
Lima Kedai			Jalan Bukit Resam	Jalan Bukit Resam	T-junctions
Gelang Patah			Kota Iskandar Highway	J7 Johor State Route J7 – Ulu Choh, Pekan Nenas, Pontian, Kukup, Tanjung Piai; J239 Kota Iskandar Highway – Iskandar Puteri, Kota Iskandar Second Link Expressway / AH143 – Kuala Lumpur, Melaka, Senai, Pasir Gudang, Johor Bahru, Tuas (Singapore)	Junctions
Gelang Patah			Kota Iskandar Highway	J239 Kota Iskandar Highway – Iskandar Puteri, Kota Iskandar Second Link Expressway / AH143 – Kuala Lumpur, Melaka, Senai, Pasir Gudang, Johor Bahru, Tuas (Singapore)	T-junctions
Gelang Patah			Gelang Patah	J7 Johor State Route J7 – Ulu Choh, Pekan Nenas, Pontian, Kukup, Tanjung Piai	T-junctions
Gelang Patah			Sungai Gelang Patah bridge		
Gelang Patah			Taman Dato Syed Mohd. Idrus		
Gelang Patah			Kampung Baharu		
Gelang Patah			Kampung Tiram		
Gelang Patah			Kampung Tiram Duku Kiri		
Gelang Patah			Jalan Kompleks Sultan Abu Bakar	Jalan Kompleks Sultan Abu Bakar – Kuarters Kompleks Sultan Abu Bakar, Sekolah Kebangsaan Kompleks Sultan Abu Bakar (SKKSAB), Sekolah Menengah Kebangsaan Kompleks Sultan Abu Bakar (SMKKSAB)	T-junctions
Gelang Patah			Sungai Senapang Bridge		
Gelang Patah			Jalan Paya Mengkuang	Jalan Paya Mengkuang – Kampung Paya Mengkuang	T-junctions
Gelang Patah			Kampung Tanjung Pelepas		
Gelang Patah			Jalan Pendas	FT 178 Malaysia Federal Route 178 – Port of Tanjung Pelepas Second Link Expressway / AH143 – Tuas (Singapore)	T-junctions
Gelang Patah			Tanjung Pelepas TNB Intake	Tenaga Nasional Berhad (TNB)-Tanjung Pelepas intake	
Gelang Patah			Kampung Pok		
Gelang Patah			Kampung Pok Besar	Jalan Paya Mengkuang – Kampung Paya Mengkuang	T-junctions
Gelang Patah			Malaysian Airline System Flight 653 crash site		
Gelang Patah			Tanjung Kupang		
Gelang Patah			Kampung Padang		
Gelang Patah			Pendas	Pendas Seafood Restaurant	Start/End of road
1.000 mi = 1.609 km; 1.000 km = 0.621 mi
