= Port of Tanjung Pelepas Highway =

Road in Malaysia

Federal Route 177
- Port of Tanjung Pelepas Highway

Route information
- Maintained by Malaysian Public Works Department
- Length: 6.60 km (4.10 mi)
- Existed: 1996–present
- History: Completed in 1998

Major junctions
- Southwest end: Port of Tanjung Pelepas
- FT 178 Jalan Cabang Second Link Expressway / AH143

- Northeast end: Port of Tanjung Pelepas Interchange Second Link Expressway / AH143

Location
- Country: Malaysia
- Primary destinations: Tanjung Kupang, Pendas

Highway system
- Highways in Malaysia; Expressways; Federal; State

Port of Tanjung Pelepas Highway, Federal Route 177, is a highway that connects the Port of Tanjung Pelepas interchange on the Second Link Expressway E3 to Port of Tanjung Pelepas, Johor, Malaysia. This 6.6 km (4.1 mi) highway has a motorcycle lane. The Kilometre Zero of the Federal Route 177 starts at Port of Tanjung Pelepas.

At most sections, the Federal Route 177 was built under the JKR R5 road standard, with a speed limit of 90 km/h.

== Junction lists ==
The entire route is located in Johor Bahru District, Johor.

Legend:

- I/C - Interchange, I/S - Intersection, RSA - Rest and service area, OBR - Overhead bridge restaurant, R/R - Restaurant and rest plaza, L/B - Layby, V/P - Vista point, TN - tunnel, T/P - Toll plaza, BR - Bridge
- C - Cloverleaf, S - Stack, T-A - Trumpet-A, T-B - Trumpet-B, DT - Directional-T/Y, SDT - Semi-Directional-T/Y, P-Y - Partial-Y, D - Diamond, P-C - Partial cloverleaf, D-D - Diverging diamond, D-R - Direct ramp

Location	km	mi	Exit	Name	Destinations	Notes
Port of Tanjung Pelepas	6.6	4.1	17701	Likedua I/C	Second Link Expressway / AH143 – Kuala Lumpur, Senai, Johor Bahru, Iskandar Puteri, Gelang Patah, Malaysia–Singapore Second Crossing (2 km), Sultan Abu Bakar CIQ Checkpoint (1.3 km), Tanjung Kupang Toll Plaza (1 km), Tuas (Singapore)	Trumpet interchange
Port of Tanjung Pelepas			Sungai Tiram Duku bridge			
Port of Tanjung Pelepas			17702	Forest City I/C	Forest City Highway – Forest City	Interchange
Port of Tanjung Pelepas			17703	Jalan Cabang I/C	FT 178 Jalan Cabang – Muara Sungai Pulai, Pangkalan Marin Syahbandar, PTP Industrial Area; J4 Jalan Gelang Patah–Skudai – Pendas, Tanjung Kupang, Gelang Patah	Junctions
Port of Tanjung Pelepas			Port of Tanjung Pelepas bridge Sungai Perpal bridge			
Port of Tanjung Pelepas	0.0	0.0	–	Port of Tanjung Pelepas	Port of Tanjung Pelepas – Main terminal, Headquarters and control centre, Royal Malaysian Customs office	Junctions
1.000 mi = 1.609 km; 1.000 km = 0.621 mi
