= List of bus routes in Johor Bahru =

Public buses in Johor Bahru
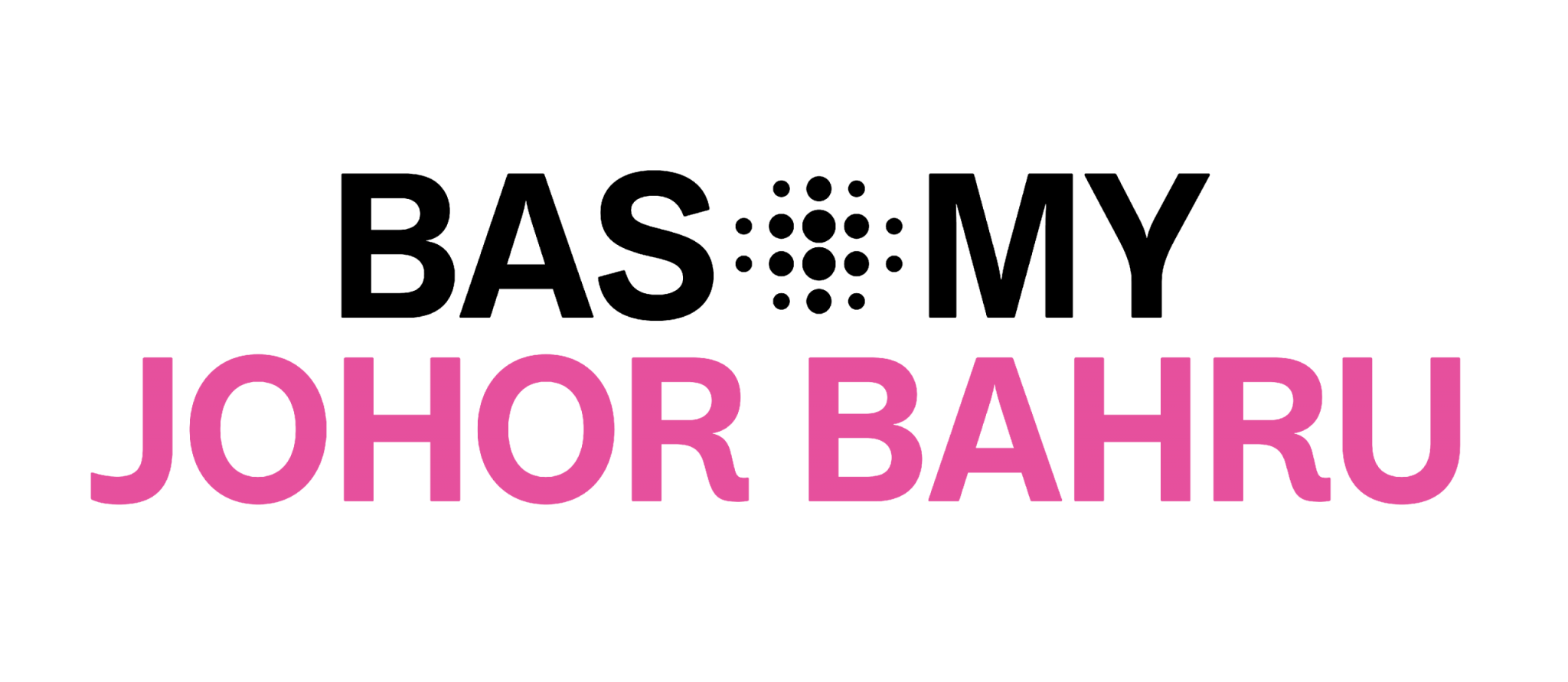

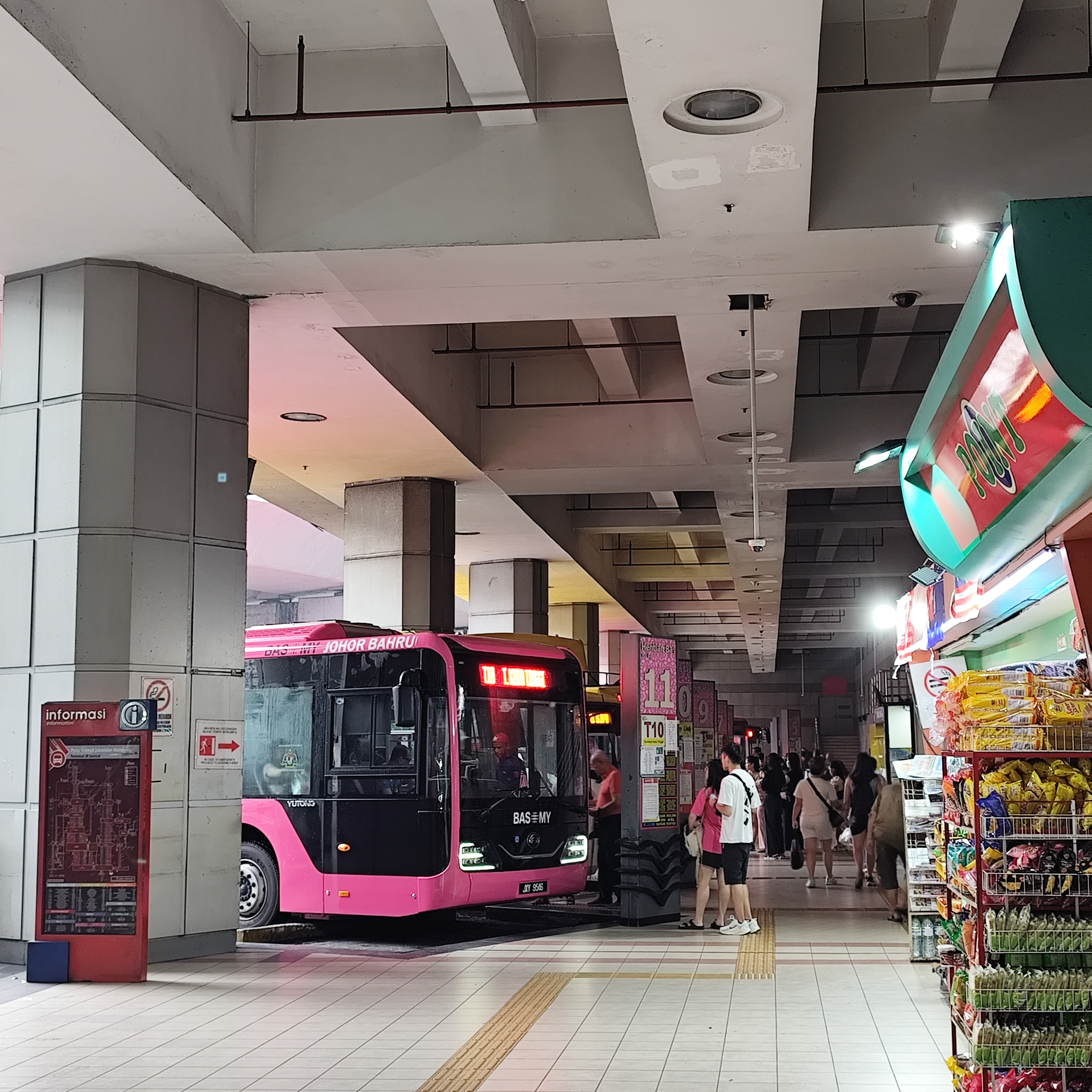
- Public buses operated by Handal Indah at JB Sentral Bus Terminal, connecting the suburbs with the city centre.
- Formerly: myBAS Johor Bahru
- Locale: Johor Bahru
- Service type: Transit bus
- Routes: 81 (as of 2025)
- Fuel type: Diesel; Hybrid; Electric
- Operator: Handal Indah (Causeway Link); Maju; Transit Link (City Bus); S&S International

This is a list of bus routes within Johor Bahru, the capital city of the Malaysian state of Johor, and the core city of the second most populous district in Malaysia, Johor Bahru District.

As of 2025, there are 81 bus routes in Johor Bahru, 57 of which are local public bus routes, including services from the city centre into neighbouring cities and towns, such as Kulai, Pontian, Kota Tinggi and Ayer Hitam. The remaining 24 routes are cross-border services between Johor Bahru and Singapore.

Local public buses in Johor Bahru currently accept cashless payments such as Visa card, NFC using smartphone or smartwatch, and QR code payment, making it the first Malaysian city to support contactless payment using smart devices on urban bus network.

== Local bus routes ==
=== BAS.MY bus routes ===
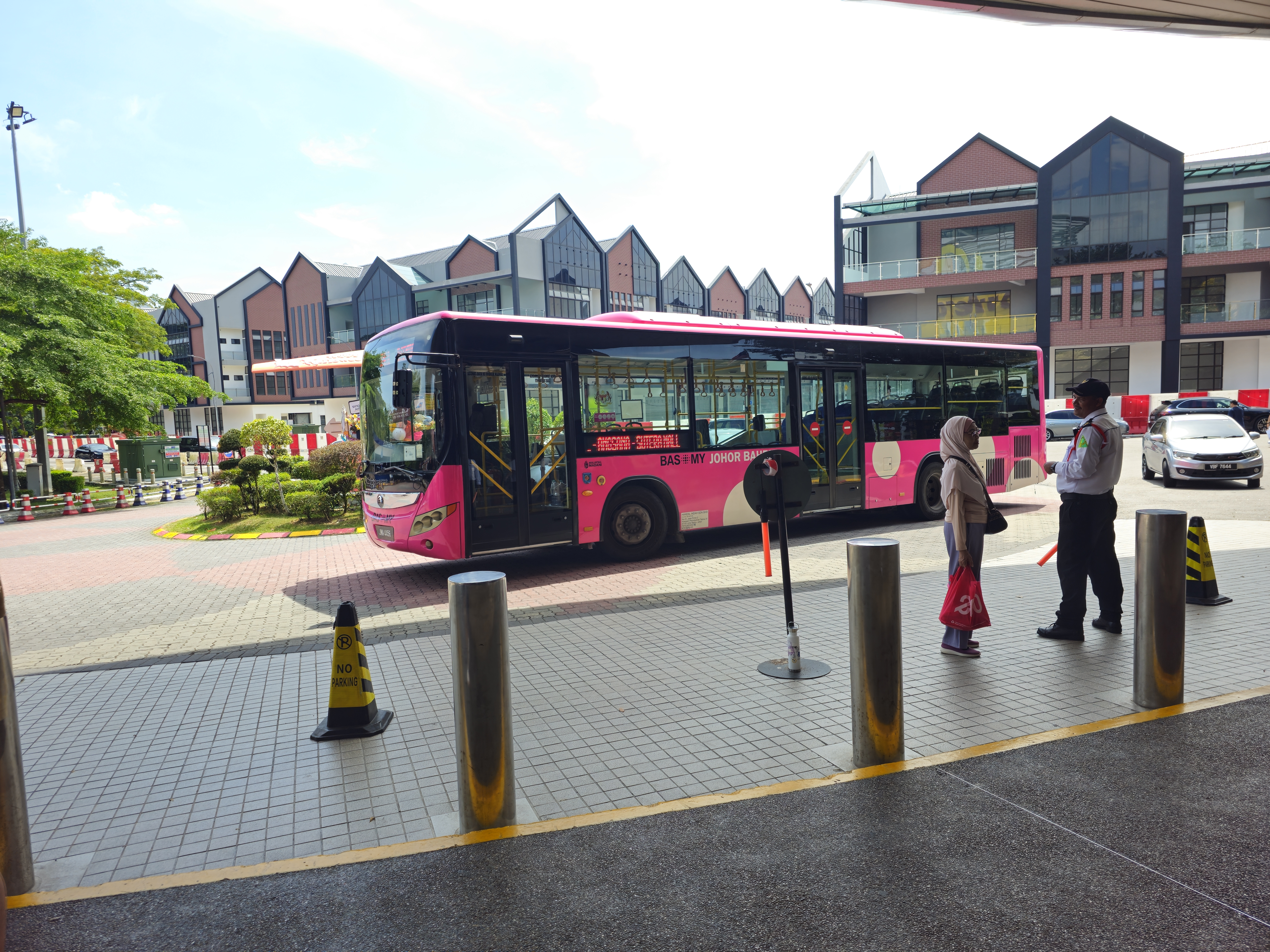
A BAS.MY Johor Bahru J34 bus at Sutera Mall.

Handal Indah and its subcontractors operate a total of 21 bus routes under the BAS.MY Johor Bahru programme, connecting Johor Bahru to its suburbs and surrounding towns.

Route number	Origin	Destination	Service type	Operator	Notes
J10	JB Sentral Bus Terminal	Kota Tinggi Bus Terminal	Trunk	Handal Indah	Serves Tebrau (IKEA branch) / Toppen Bus Terminal and Ulu Tiram Bus Terminal in both directions.
J11	JB Sentral Bus Terminal	AEON Mall Bandar Dato' Onn	Trunk	Handal Indah	Serves Kangkar Tebrau in both directions.
J13	JB Sentral Bus Terminal	Larkin Sentral Bus Terminal	Trunk	Handal Indah	
J15	JB Sentral Bus Terminal	Mid Valley Southkey	Trunk	Handal Indah	
J16	B5 Johor Street Market / Angsana Mall	Tebrau (IKEA branch) / Toppen Bus Terminal	Trunk	Handal Indah	Serves Larkin Sentral Bus Terminal in both directions.
J20	JB Sentral Bus Terminal	Masai Bus Terminal	Trunk	Handal Indah	
J21	JB Sentral Bus Terminal	Permas Jaya Bus Terminal	Trunk	Handal Indah	Serves Jalan Permas 13 in both directions.
J22	JB Sentral Bus Terminal	Taman Scientex, Pasir Gudang	Trunk	Handal Indah	Serves Pasir Gudang Bus Terminal in both directions.
J30	JB Sentral Bus Terminal	Kulai Bus Terminal	Trunk	Handal Indah	
J31	JB Sentral Bus Terminal	Taman Pulai Mutiara	Trunk	Handal Indah	Serves Taman Universiti Bus Terminal in both directions.
J32	JB Sentral Bus Terminal	Taman Selesa Jaya	Trunk	Transit Link (Johor Bahru) (Note: Operates the route as a subcontractor on behalf of Handal Indah.)	
J33	JB Sentral Bus Terminal	Taman Tan Sri Yaacob	Trunk	Handal Indah	
J34	JB Sentral Bus Terminal	Sutera Mall Bus Terminal	Trunk	Handal Indah	Serves the main entrance of Sutera Mall in both directions.
J40	Larkin Sentral Bus Terminal	Gelang Patah Sentral Bus Terminal	Trunk	Handal Indah	Serves Gelang Patah Bus Terminal in both directions.
J42	Gelang Patah Bus Terminal	Kampung Pendas Baru	Trunk	Handal Indah	Serves Port of Tanjung Pelepas in both directions.
J44	Larkin Sentral Bus Terminal	Puteri Harbour Ferry Terminal	Trunk	Handal Indah	
J50	Larkin Sentral Bus Terminal	Pontian Bus Terminal	Trunk	Transit Link (Johor Bahru)	
J100	JB Sentral Bus Terminal	KSL City Mall	Feeder	Handal Indah	Loop service.
J200	Masai Bus Terminal	Seri Alam	Feeder	Handal Indah	Loop service.
J205	Masai Bus Terminal	Kota Masai (Lotus's branch)	Feeder	Handal Indah	Serves Pasir Gudang Bus Terminal in both directions.
J300	Kulai Bus Terminal	Putri Kulai Bus Terminal	Feeder	Handal Indah	

=== Johor Bahru ===
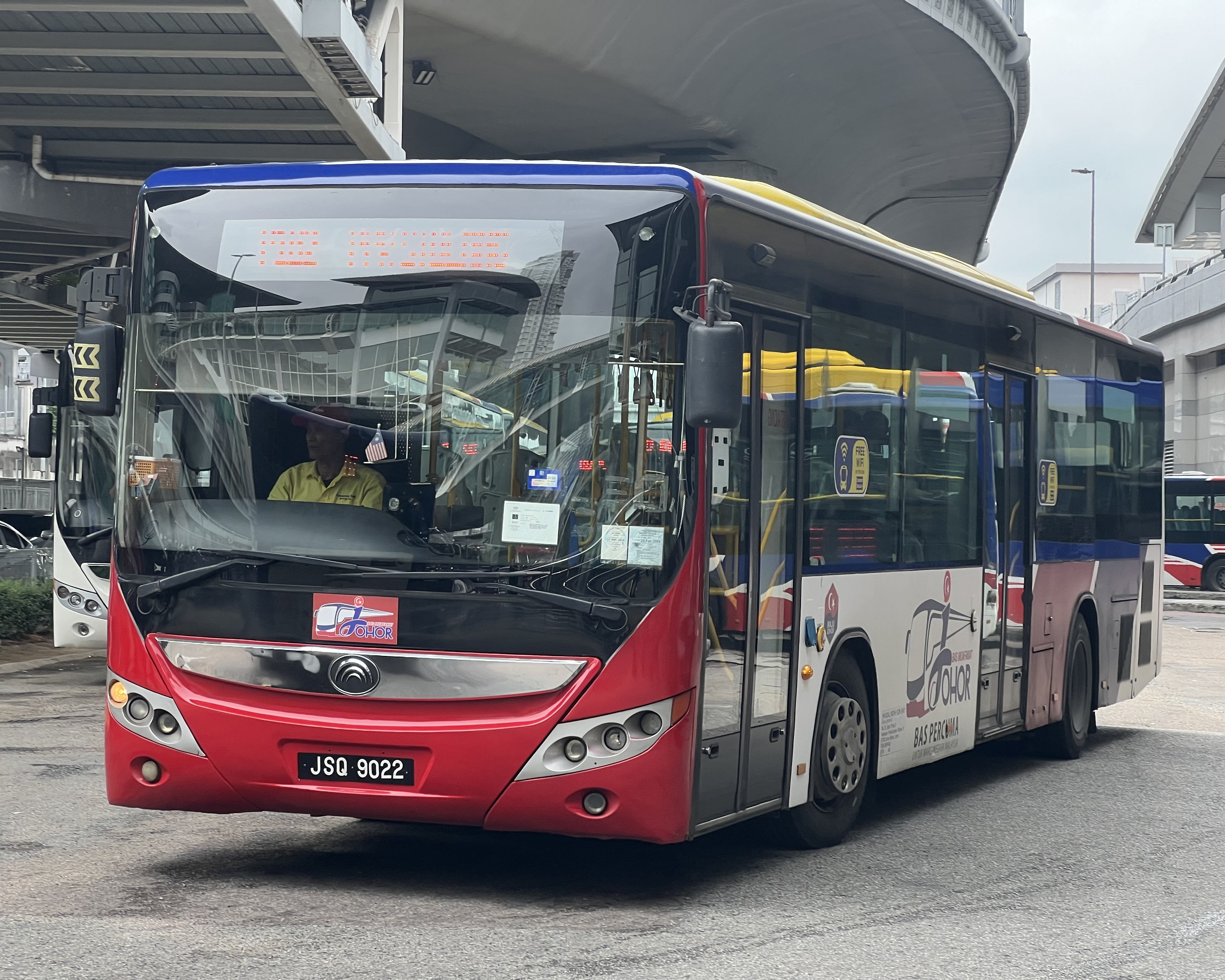
A Bas Muafakat Johor P102 bus at JB Sentral Bus Terminal.

Johor Public Transport Corporation oversees the operation of ten bus routes serving Johor Bahru, funded by Johor Bahru City Council. The bus routes are operated by Mayang Sari and Handal Indah.

Route number	Origin	Destination	Service type	Operator	Notes
P101	Larkin Sentral Bus Terminal	JB Sentral Bus Terminal	Loop	Handal Indah	
P102	PPR Sri Stulang	JB Sentral Bus Terminal	Loop	Handal Indah	
P103	PPR Sri Stulang	Larkin Sentral Bus Terminal	Bidirectional	Handal Indah	Serves Mid Valley Southkey in both directions.
P104	Larkin Sentral Bus Terminal	Taman Johor (Opp KIP Mall Tampoi)	Bidirectional	Mayang Sari	
P104-01	Larkin Sentral Bus Terminal	Damansara Alif	Loop (Supplementary)	Mayang Sari	Operates on school days only.
P106	PPR Sri Stulang	AEON Mall Tebrau City	Loop	Mayang Sari	
P111	PPR Desa Mutiara	AEON Mall Tebrau City	Bidirectional	Mayang Sari	
P112	PPR Desa Mutiara	Impian Emas	Bidirectional	Mayang Sari	
P113	PPR Desa Mutiara	Larkin Sentral Bus Terminal	Bidirectional	Mayang Sari	
P113-01	Larkin Sentral Bus Terminal	Larkin Indah	Loop (Supplementary)	Mayang Sari	Operates on school days only.

==== Shuttle bus services ====
Johor Public Transport Corporation also oversees the operation of four shuttle bus services in Johor Bahru, also funded by Johor Bahru City Council. The shuttle bus services are operated by Mayang Sari.

Route number	Origin	Destination	Service type	Operator	Notes
HSA	Larkin Sentral Bus Terminal	Sultanah Aminah Hospital	Loop	Mayang Sari	Operates on weekdays only.
HSA-01	Tropicana Lido	Sultanah Aminah Hospital	Loop	Mayang Sari	Operates on weekdays only.
HSI	Lotus's Tebrau	Sultan Ismail Hospital	Loop	Mayang Sari	Operates on weekdays only.
Z00	Kota Jail	Johor Zoo	Bidirectional	Mayang Sari	

=== Iskandar Puteri ===
Johor Public Transport Corporation oversees the operation of seven bus routes serving Iskandar Puteri, funded by Iskandar Puteri City Council. The bus routes are operated by Handal Indah.

Route number	Origin	Destination	Service type	Operator	Notes
P201	Taman Universiti Bus Terminal	Taman Pulai Indah	Loop	Handal Indah	
P202	Taman Universiti Bus Terminal	Taman Ungku Tun Aminah Bus Terminal	Loop	Handal Indah	
P203	PPR Melana	KIP Mall Tampoi	Bidirectional	Handal Indah	Serves Taman Selesa Jaya in both directions.
P211	Taman Universiti Bus Terminal	Larkin Sentral Bus Terminal	Bidirectional	Handal Indah	Serves University of Technology Malaysia in both directions.
P212	Perling Mall Bus Terminal	Mutiara Rini	Bidirectional	Handal Indah	
P213	Gelang Patah Sentral Bus Terminal	Iskandar Puteri City Council (MBIP)	Bidirectional	Handal Indah	Serves Gelang Patah Bus Terminal in both directions.
P214	Taman Universiti Bus Terminal	Impian Emas	Bidirectional	Handal Indah	

=== Pasir Gudang ===
Johor Public Transport Corporation oversees the operation of six bus routes serving Pasir Gudang, funded by Pasir Gudang City Council. The bus routes are operated by Maju and Mayang Sari.

Route number	Origin	Destination	Service type	Operator	Notes
P302	Desa Rakyat	Pasir Gudang Bus Terminal	Bidirectional	Maju	
P303	Kota Masai Bus Terminal	Pasir Gudang Bus Terminal	Bidirectional	Mayang Sari	
P311	Masai Bus Terminal	Kampung Kuala Masai	Loop	Maju	
P312	Masai Bus Terminal	Pasir Gudang Bus Terminal	Loop	Maju	Operates clockwise and counter-clockwise variants.
P313	Ulu Tiram Bus Terminal	Felda Sungai Tiram	Bidirectional	Maju	
P314	Kampung Kong Kong	Pasir Gudang Bus Terminal	Bidirectional	Maju	

=== Kulai ===
Johor Public Transport Corporation oversees the operation of six bus routes serving Kulai, funded by Kulai Municipal Council. The bus routes are operated by Handal Indah and Mayang Sari.

Route number	Origin	Destination	Service type	Operator	Notes
P401	Kulai Bus Terminal	Bandar Putra Kulai	Loop	Handal Indah	
P402	Econsave (Senai branch)	Pekan Senai (Senai Airport)	Loop	Handal Indah	
P403	Kulai Bus Terminal	Felda Inas	Bidirectional	Handal Indah	
P403-01	Felda Inas	Bandar Tenggara	Loop (Supplementary)	Mayang Sari	Operates on school days only.
P411	Kulai Bus Terminal	Larkin Sentral Bus Terminal	Bidirectional	Handal Indah	
P412	Kulai Bus Terminal	Taman Scientex Kulai (Kelapa Sawit)	Loop	Handal Indah	

=== Other local bus routes ===
Service	Destinations
2	Kulai · Kelapa Sawit · Bukit Batu · Simpang Renggam · Machap · Ayer Hitam
52T	Pontian · Pekan Nanas · Ulu Choh · GP Sentral · Gelang Patah
605	Benut · Pontian · Kukup
AA1	JB Sentral · Senai International Airport (Express)
CG1	Country Garden Danga Bay · JB Sentral
CT	JB Sentral · Taman Pelangi · Sri Tebrau · Sentosa · Bayu Puteri
EC1	Hako Village · Eco Galleria · Sunway Grid (weekdays only, loop service)
EC1	Hako Village · JB Sentral · Mid Valley Southkey (weekends only)
FC1	Forest City · Sultan Abu Bakar Complex
FC2	Forest City · Eco Botanic · NSK Nusajaya · AEON Bukit Indah
GTL 02	Kulai · Kelapa Sawit · Felda Bukit Batu · Sedenak Tech Park · Parit Mekasar · Parit Betak · Kampung Sri Merlong · Parit Raja Darat · Parit Raja · Ayer Hitam
JPO1	JB Sentral · Tampoi · Skudai · Senai · Kulaijaya · Johor Premium Outlets
JPO2	Johor Premium Outlets · Sultan Iskandar Building
JPO3	Johor Premium Outlets · Sultan Abu Bakar Complex
RnF	R&F Mall · JB Sentral

== Cross-border bus routes ==
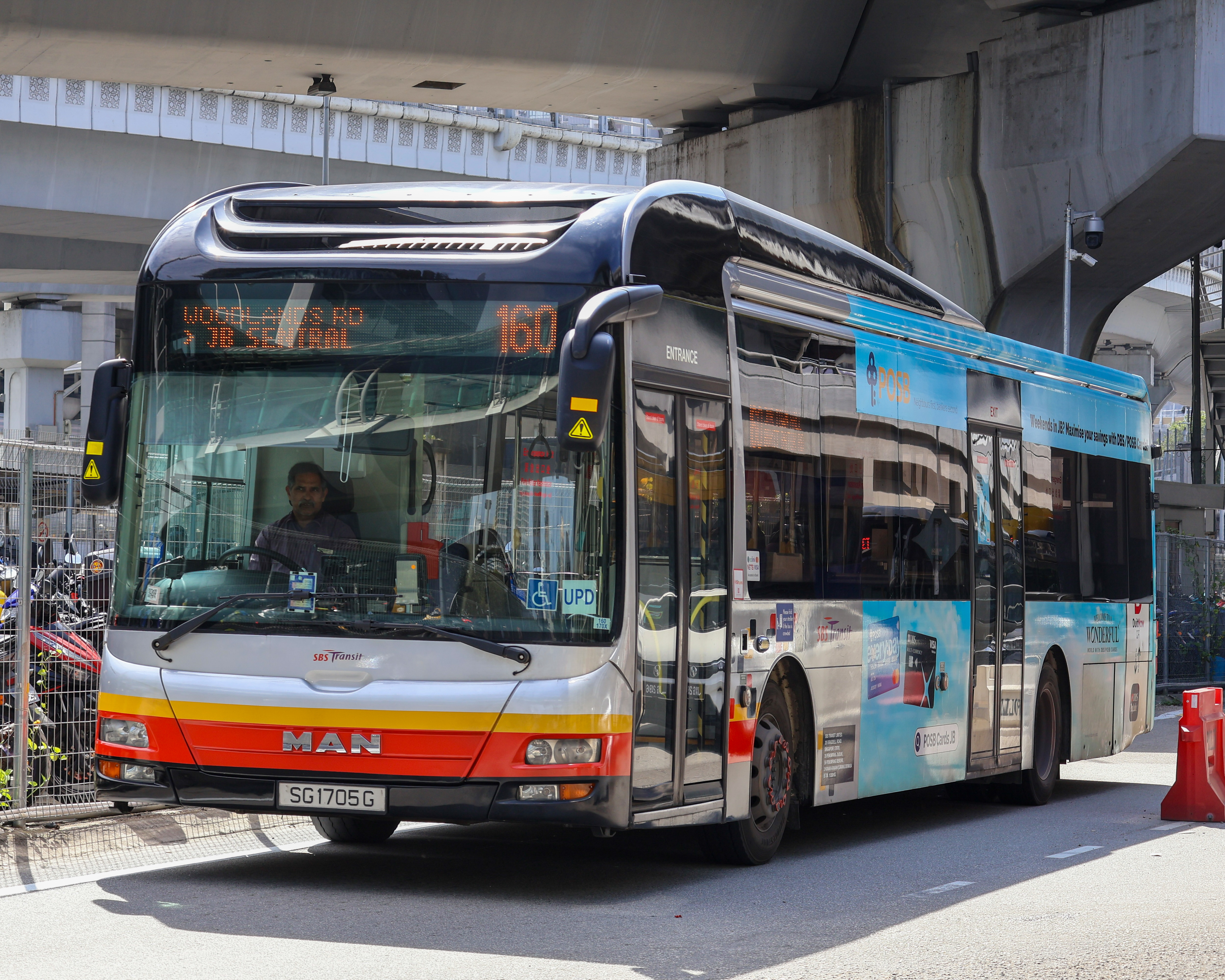
Cross-border bus at JB Sentral Bus Terminal.

=== Singapore public bus routes ===
Singapore local operators operate these routes as part of the public bus service in Singapore side, with fares and payment methods are standardized following Singapore Land Transport Authority adjustments. These services only crosses the border via Johore Causeway and the buses is interchangeable between the checkpoints. Passengers may take any of the Singapore buses between the checkpoints without being charged separately, as long as they board/alight the listed Singapore local buses after/before the checkpoint.

Service	Origin	Destination	Type	Operator	Notes
160	Jurong Town Hall Bus Interchange	JB Sentral	Loop	SBS Transit	
170	Queen Street Terminal	Larkin Sentral	Bidirectional	SBS Transit	
170X	Kranji MRT station	JB Sentral	Loop	SBS Transit	Follows Route 170 alignments up to the respective terminus
950	Woodlands Temporary Bus Interchange	JB Sentral	Loop	SMRT Buses	

=== Causeway Link routes ===
These routes are operated by Malaysian operator Causeway Link (Handal Indah), with fare system set by the company. These routes serve as semi-express routes, with multiple stops at Malaysian side and direct express service to the Singapore side terminus.

Routes plying through Johore Causeway and Second-Link Bridge respectively are interchangeable as long as passenger stays in the Causeway Link cross-border system throughout the journey.

Service	Origin	Destination	Notes
CW1	JB CIQ (Sultan Iskandar Building)	Kranji MRT station	Interchangeable with CWL at JB CIQ.
CW2	JB CIQ (Sultan Iskandar Building)	Queen Street Terminal	Interchangeable with CWL at JB CIQ.
CW3	Perling Mall	Jurong Town Hall Bus Interchange	
CW3L	Perling Mall	CIQ Second Link (Sultan Abu Bakar Complex)	Truncated route of CW3 on Malaysian side as supplement service. Interchangeable to other Singapore-bound CW routes after Second Link CIQ.
CW3S	Taman Ungku Tun Aminah Terminal	CIQ Second Link (Sultan Abu Bakar Complex)	Interchangeable to other Singapore-bound CW routes after Second Link CIQ.
CW4	Pontian Terminal	Jurong Town Hall Bus Interchange (Jurong East)	Weekdays only, runs as non-cross border Route 52T on weekends up to Gelang Patah.
CW4G	Gelang Patah Terminal	CIQ Second Link	Interchangeable to other Singapore-bound CW routes after Second Link CIQ.
CW4S	Sutera Mall	Jurong Town Hall Bus Interchange (Jurong East)	Does not operate beyond CIQ Second Link on Malaysian-bound service.
CW5	JB CIQ	Newton Circus	Interchangeable with CWL at JB CIQ.
CW6	Boon Lay MRT	CIQ Second Link	Interchangeable to other Malaysian-bound CW routes after Second Link CIQ
CW7	Tuas Link MRT	CIQ Second Link	Interchangeable to other Malaysian-bound CW routes after Second Link CIQ
CW7L	Hotel Ramada Meridin	CIQ Second Link	Interchangeable to other Singapore-bound CW routes after Second Link CIQ.
FC1	Forest City Sales Gallery	CIQ Second Link	Interchangeable to other Singapore-bound CW routes after Second Link CIQ.
CWL	JB CIQ	Larkin Sentral	Interchangeable with CW1/CW2/CW5 at JB CIQ.

=== Other operators ===
Service	Origin	Destination	Type	Operator	Notes
AC7	JB CIQ	Yishun Bus Interchange	Bidirectional	Ridewell Travel	
SJE	Larkin Sentral	Queen Street Terminal	Bidirectional, express	Singapore-Johore Express	
TS1	JB CIQ	Changi Airport	Bidirectional	Transtar	
TS6	Gelang Patah Sentral	Buona Vista MRT	Bidirectional	Transtar	
TS8	JB CIQ	Resorts World Sentosa	Bidirectional	Transtar	

== See also ==
- Johor Bahru–Singapore Rapid Transit System
- Johor Bahru Sentral
- Larkin Sentral
