= Kota Iskandar Highway =

Road in Malaysia

- Lebuh Kota Iskandar
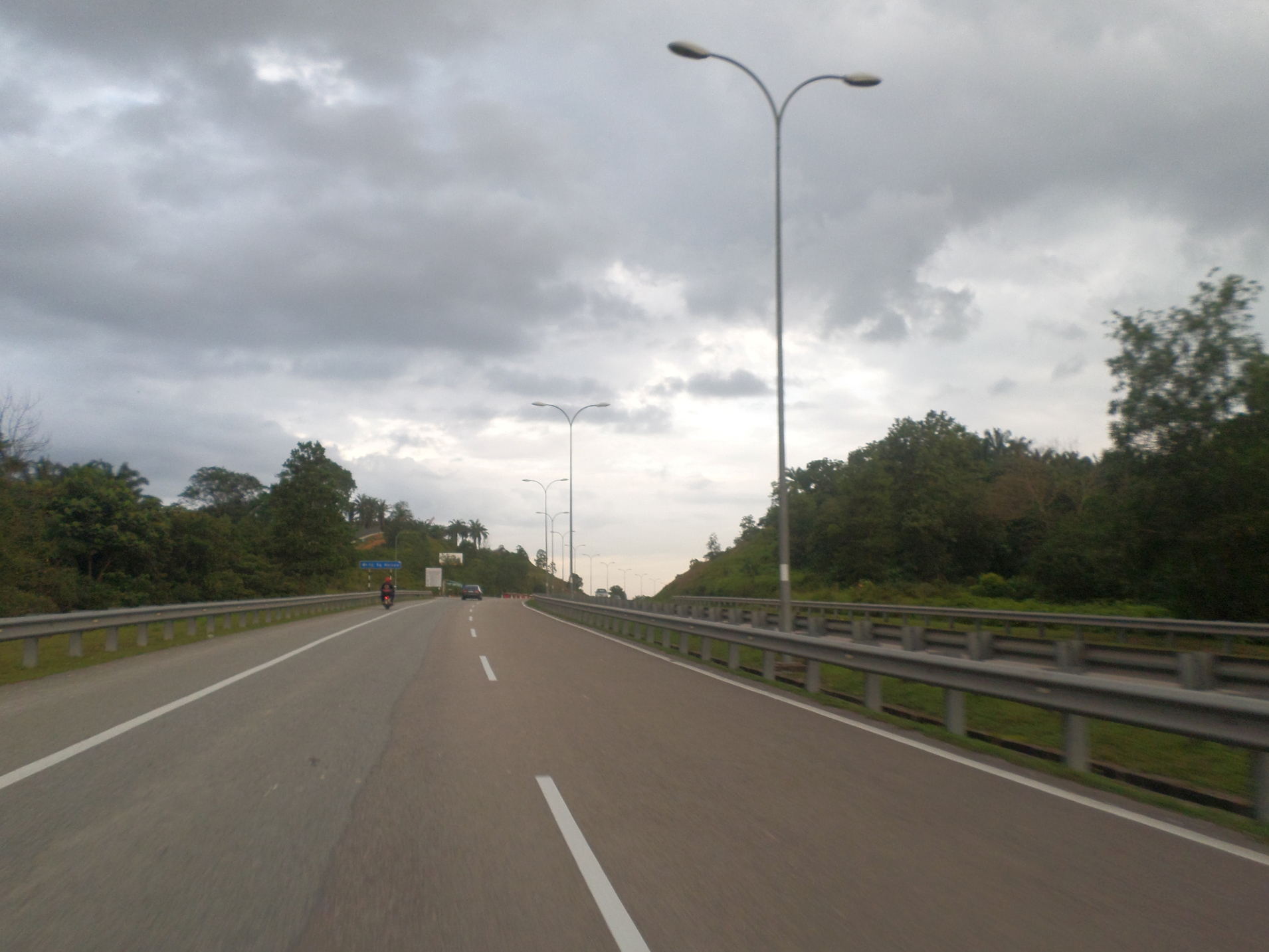

Major junctions
- West end: Gelang Patah
- J4 Jalan Gelang Patah-Skudai; Second Link Expressway / AH143; FT 52 Iskandar Coastal Highway
- East end: Kota Iskandar

Location
- Country: Malaysia
- Primary destinations: Iskandar Puteri

Highway system
- Highways in Malaysia; Expressways; Federal; State

Kota Iskandar Highway (Malay: Lebuh Kota Iskandar; Johor State Route J239) is a major highway in Iskandar Puteri, Johor, Malaysia. It connects the town of Gelang Patah to Kota Iskandar.

== Junction lists ==
The entire route is located in Iskandar Puteri subdistrict, Johor Bahru District, Johor.

Legend:

- I/C - Interchange, I/S - Intersection, RSA - Rest and service area, OBR - Overhead bridge restaurant, R/R - Restaurant and rest plaza, L/B - Layby, V/P - Vista point, TN - tunnel, T/P - Toll plaza, BR - Bridge
- C - Cloverleaf, S - Stack, T-A - Trumpet-A, T-B - Trumpet-B, DT - Directional-T/Y, SDT - Semi-Directional-T/Y, P-Y - Partial-Y, D - Diamond, P-C - Partial cloverleaf, D-D - Diverging diamond, D-R - Direct ramp

Location	km	mi	Exit	Name	Destinations	Notes
Gelang Patah				Gelang Patah	J4 Johor State Route J4 – Lima Kedai, Skudai, Johor Bahru, Mutiara Rini, Gelang Patah, Pontian, Tanjung Kupang, Pendas	T-junctions
Gelang Patah				Gelang Patah-LINKEDUA I/C	Second Link Expressway / AH143 – Kuala Lumpur, Malacca, Senai, Senai International Airport, Pontian, Johor Bahru, Pasir Gudang, Port of Tanjung Pelepas (PTP), Tuas (Singapore)	Cloverleaf interchange
Iskandar Medini City				Ledang Roundabout -Nusajaya Roundabout	see also FT 52 Iskandar Coastal Highway	
Iskandar Medini City				Nusajaya Roundabout I/C	Iskandar Medical City; FT 52 Iskandar Coastal Highway – Johor Bahru, Tampoi, Skudai, Woodlands (Singapore), Danga Bay	Roundabout interchange
Iskandar Medini City				Medini	Persiaran Medini – Medini Town Centre, Legoland Malaysia	Junctions
Kota Iskandar				Persiaran Dato' Sri Amar Diraja	Persiaran Dato' Sri Amar Diraja – Puteri Harbour	Roundabout
Kota Iskandar				Persiaran Dato' Menteri	Persiaran Dato' Menteri – Bangunan Sultan Ismail (Johor State Secretariat Building), Dataran Mahkota, Bangunan Dato' Jaafar Muhammad (Chief Minister's Office), Bangunan Dato' Muhammad Salleh Perang (State Office), Bangunan Dato' Mohammad Ibrahim Munsyi (State Office), Bangunan Dato' Abdul Rahman Andak (State Office)	T-junctions
Kota Iskandar				Kota Iskandar Mosque		
Kota Iskandar				Persiaran Dewan Negeri	Persiaran Dewan Negeri – Bangunan Sultan Ismail (Johor State Secretariat Building), Dataran Mahkota, Bangunan Dato' Jaafar Muhammad (Chief Minister's Office)	T-junctions
Kota Iskandar				Kota Iskandar; Laksamana Roundabout	Persiaran Dato' Bentara Luar	Roundabout
Kota Iskandar			Sungai Simpang Batu bridge			
Kota Iskandar				Persiaran Ujong Medini	Persiaran Ujong Medini – Marlborough College Malaysia (MCM)	T-junctions
Kota Iskandar			Sungai Udang bridge			
Kota Iskandar				Nusajaya North I/C	FT 52 Iskandar Coastal Highway – Gelang Patah, Johor Bahru, Tampoi, Skudai, Woodlands (Singapore), Danga Bay	Cloverleaf interchange
Kota Iskandar				Roundabout	Jalan Kampung Lalang; Horizon Hills	Roundabout
Kota Iskandar				Nusajaya-LINKEDUA I/C	Second Link Expressway / AH143 – Kuala Lumpur, Malacca, Senai, Senai International Airport, Pontian, Johor Bahru, Pasir Gudang, Port of Tanjung Pelepas (PTP), Tuas (Singapore)	Cloverleaf interchange
Gelang Patah				Jalan Gelang Patah-Skudai	J4 Johor State Route J4 – Lima Kedai, Skudai, Johor Bahru, Mutiara Rini, Gelang Patah, Tanjung Kupang, Pendas	Junctions
Gelang Patah				Jalan Gelang Patah–Ulu Choh	J7 Johor State Route J7 – Ulu Choh, Pekan Nenas, Pontian, Kukup, Tanjung Piai	T-junctions
1.000 mi = 1.609 km; 1.000 km = 0.621 mi: Concurrency terminus; Incomplete access

== See also ==
- Transport in Malaysia
