= Second Link Expressway =

Expressway in Johor, Malaysia

Expressway 3
- Second Link Expressway; Lebuhraya Hubungan Kedua 第二通道高速公路
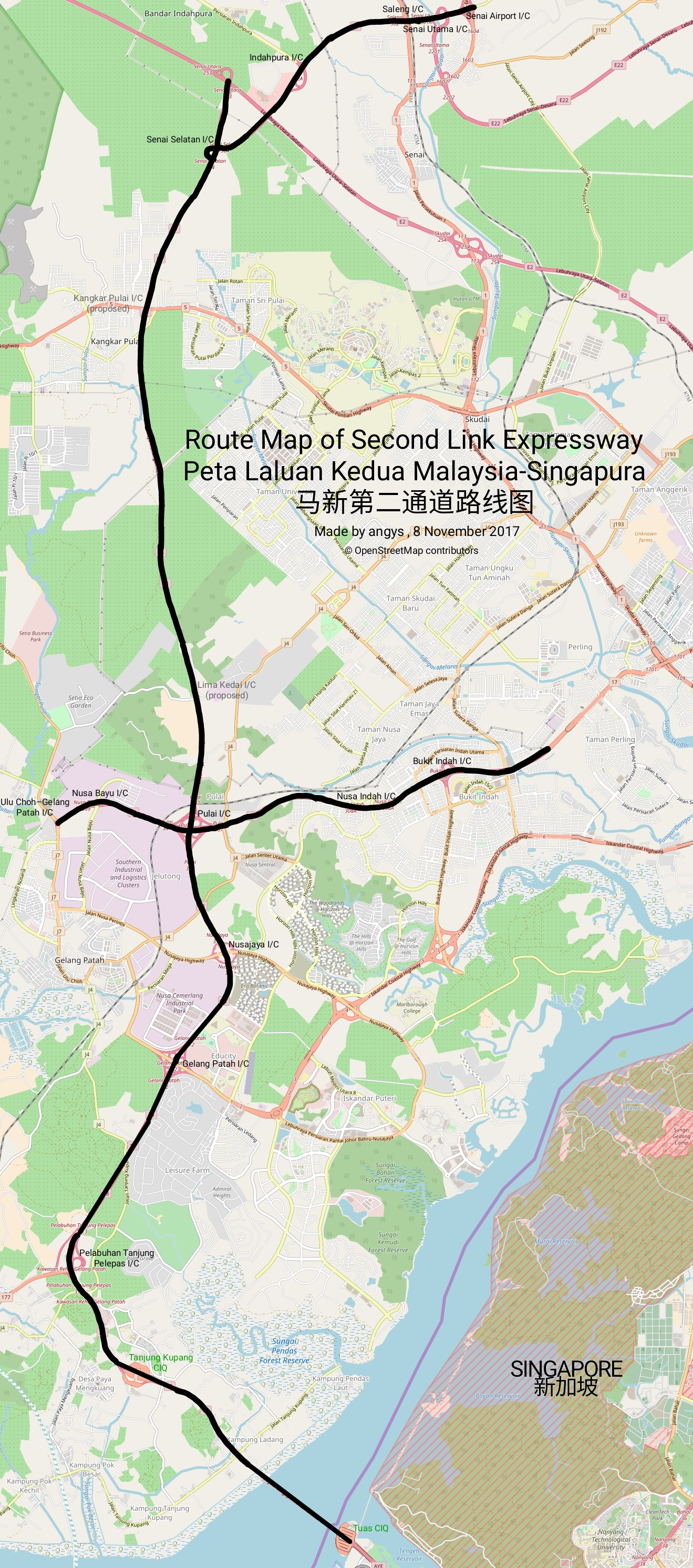

Route information
- Part of AH143 (Senai North–Tuas)
- Maintained by PLUS Expressways
- Length: 47 km (29 mi)
- Existed: 1994–present
- History: Completed in 1997

Major junctions
- North end: FT 16 Senai Airport Highway at Senai, Johor
- Senai–Desaru Expressway; FT 1 Skudai Highway; North–South Expressway Southern Route / AH2; FT 17 Pasir Gudang Highway (Persisiran Perling); FT 177 Port of Tanjung Pelepas Highway
- South end: AYE at the Malaysia–Singapore Second Link

Location
- Country: Malaysia
- Primary destinations: Saleng, Indahpura, Bukit Indah, Iskandar Puteri, Pulai, Pontian, Ulu Choh, Kangkar Pulai, Taman Perling, Gelang Patah, Tanjung Kupang

Highway system
- Highways in Malaysia; Expressways; Federal; State

The E3 Second Link Expressway is a 47-kilometre (29-mile) controlled-access highway in Johor, Malaysia. It runs from Senai, Kulai District near the international airport to the Malaysia–Singapore Second Link at Tanjung Kupang, Johor Bahru District.

== Route background ==
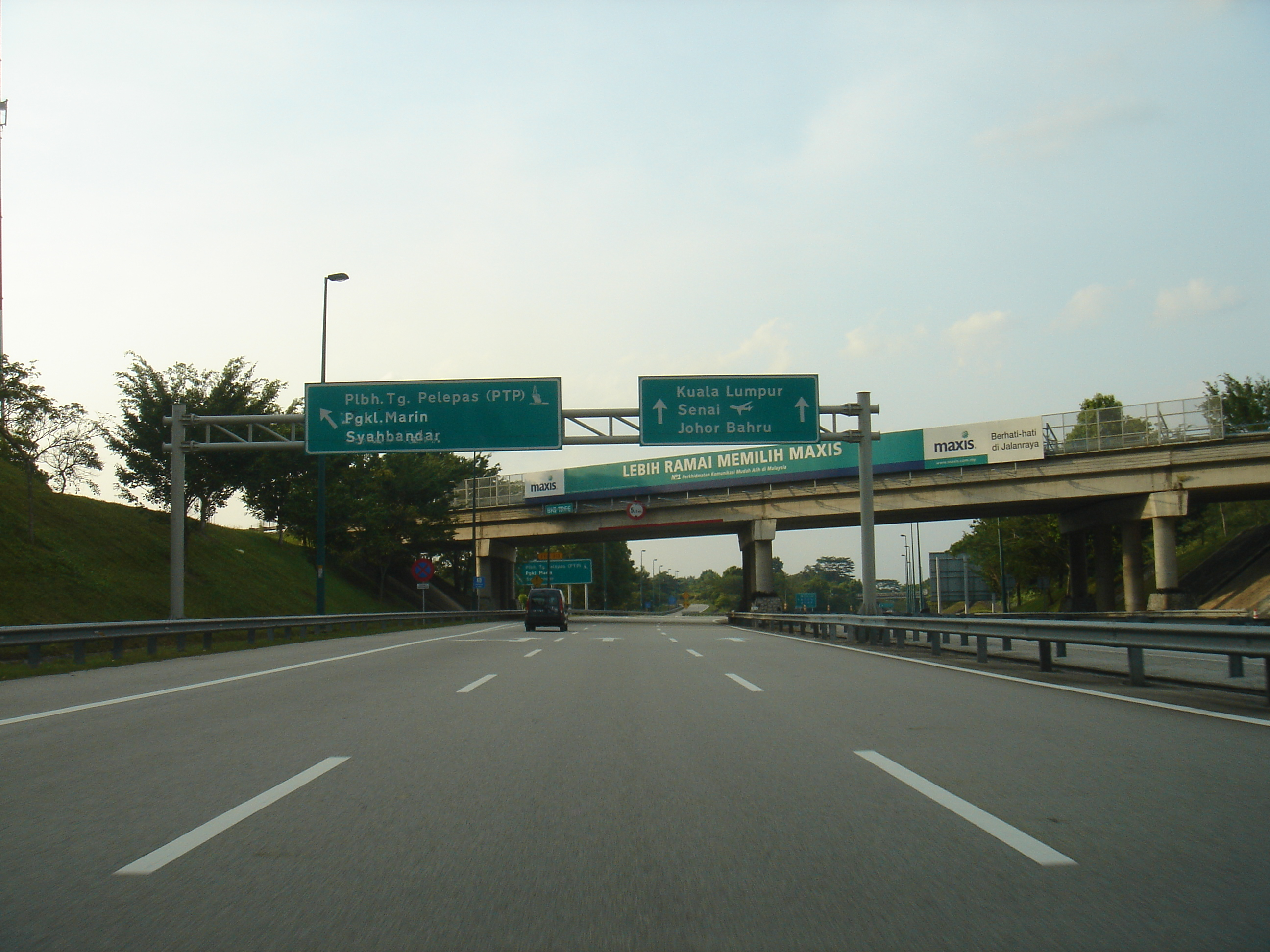
Northbound carriageway just before exit 313.

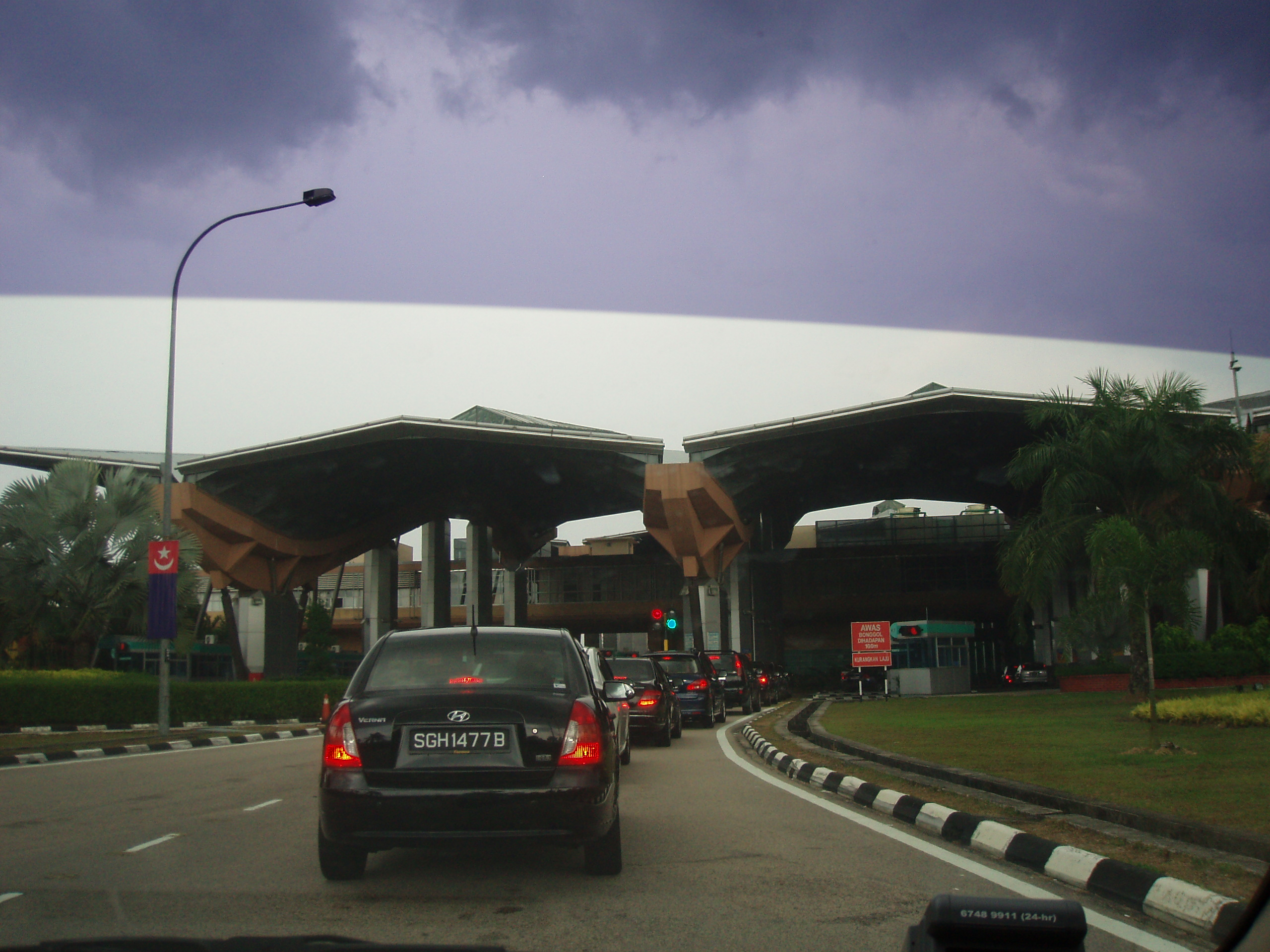
Tanjung Kupang checkpoint.

The Kilometre Zero for the entire expressway is located at the Malaysia–Singapore border at the Malaysia–Singapore Second Link.

== History ==
=== Construction of the Second Link ===
In July 1989, United Engineers Malaysia Berhad (UEM) submitted a proposal to the government of Malaysia to privatize the construction of a second link to Singapore. The acceptance of the proposal brought about the signing of a concession agreement in July 1993, giving exclusive rights and authority to UEM to design, construct, manage, operate and maintain the bridge and expressways for a period of 30 years commencing 27 July 1993.

Following this, a novation agreement was executed in May 1994, whereby UEM assigned all its rights, liabilities and obligations in respect of the concession agreement to Linkedua (Malaysia) Berhad, a wholly owned subsidiary of UEM.

The major components of the project are the Second Crossing bridge, 44 kilometers of expressways, The Sultan Abu Bakar Customs, Immigration and Quarantine Complex, three toll plazas, two rest and service areas and other ancillary facilities. The bridge was designed to accommodate up to 200,000 vehicles a day.

=== Opening ceremony ===
The Second Link was opened to traffic on 2 January 1998. It was officially opened on 18 April the same year by the Prime Ministers of both countries, namely Mahathir Mohamad of Malaysia and Goh Chok Tong of Singapore. The Malaysia–Singapore Second Crossing heralded a new era in bilateral relations, and brought with it the promise of improved economic and social ties.

In 2007, PLUS Expressway Berhad had entered into conditional agreements with the UEM Group to acquire the entire interests in Expressway Lingkaran Tengah Sdn Bhd (Elite) and Linkedua (Malaysia) Bhd for RM866mil. Since then, both ELITE and LINKEDUA became wholly owned subsidiaries of PLUS Expressways Berhad.

=== Pontian Link ===
A new link heading towards Pontian (Pontian Link) through the Pulai Interchange Exit 307A at km 15.3 on the Second Link Expressway was opened to traffic starting from 1:00 pm, 10 November 2007 on Saturday.

The Pontian Link provides easy access for highway users, connecting the Second Link Expressway (from Pulai Interchange) to Ulu Choh-Gelang Patah Interchange (KM5).

Construction of the 2.7 km link started on 17 April 2006 and was fully completed on 16 October 2007.

== Features ==
=== Number of lanes ===
==== 4-lane ====
- Senai Link – Entire route
- Northern and Southern Links (Main Link) – Senai North Interchange–Lima Kedai Interchange
- Pontian-Johor Bahru Parkway (Pontian Link) – Entire route

==== 6-lane ====
- Northern and Southern Links (Main Link) – Lima Kedai Interchange–Second Link Bridge

== Toll systems ==
Toll payments are for the expressway and Second Link tolls. Only Touch 'n Go, PLUSMiles, SmartTAG and MyRFID electronic payment system are accepted at all Second Link toll plazas, and is the only accepted paying method at the Perling, Lima Kedai and Tanjung Kupang toll plazas, though top-up lanes are available. Singapore dollar is also accepted at all Second Link toll plazas but at the rate of 1:1 (i.e. Pay S$1.00 for RM1.00, and all change are given in Malaysian ringgit). Tanjung Kupang toll plaza was the only toll along the entire highway which charged rates for motorcyclists at RM1.10 each. Since 1 January 2019, toll collection for motorcyclists ceased operations. As of March 2023, there are no longer off-peak hour toll rates.

=== Fares ===
(Since 1 March 2023)

| Class | Type of vehicles | Rate (in Malaysian Ringgit (RM)) | | | | |
| Class | Type of vehicles | Sultan Abu Bakar Complex | Tanjung Kupang | | Lima Kedai | Perling |
| Class | Type of vehicles | Sultan Abu Bakar Complex | Expressway | Bridge | Lima Kedai | Perling |
|---|---|---|---|---|---|---|
| 0 | Motorcycles (Vehicles with two axles and two wheels) | Free | | | | |
| 1 | Private Cars (Vehicles with two axles and three or four wheels (excluding taxis and buses)) | 8.68 | 1.80 | 4.34 | 3.19 | 1.88 |
| 2 | Vans and other small goods vehicles (Vehicles with two axles and five or six wheels (excluding buses)) | 27.40 | 3.40 | 13.70 | 7.80 | 4.60 |
| 3 | Large Trucks (Vehicles with three or more axles (excluding buses)) | 54.80 | 6.90 | 27.40 | 9.80 | 5.70 |
| 4 | Taxis | 7.54 | 0.90 | 3.77 | 1.64 | 0.90 |
| 5 | Buses | 11.96 | 1.47 | 5.98 | 3.19 | 1.88 |

=== Toll names ===
| Abbreviation | Name |
|---|---|
| SNU | Senai North |
| TLK | Lima Kedai |
| DRL | Tanjung Kupang |

== Interchange, layby, and rest and service area lists ==
Legend:

- I/C - Interchange, I/S - Intersection, RSA - Rest and service area, OBR - Overhead bridge restaurant, R/R - Restaurant and rest plaza, L/B - Layby, V/P - Vista point, TN - tunnel, T/P - Toll plaza, BR - Bridge
- C - Cloverleaf, S - Stack, T-A - Trumpet-A, T-B - Trumpet-B, DT - Directional-T/Y, SDT - Semi-Directional-T/Y, P-Y - Partial-Y, D - Diamond, P-C - Partial cloverleaf, D-D - Diverging diamond, D-R - Direct ramp

=== Senai Link ===
The entire route is in Kulai District, Johor.

| km | Exit | Name | Destinations | Type | Speed limit (km/h) | Notes |
|---|---|---|---|---|---|---|
| 0.0 | 301 | Senai Airport I/C | FT 16 Senai Airport Highway – Senai International Airport, Senai, Johor Bahru; Jalan Perusahaan – Senai Industrial Area | Diamond interchange | 60 | |
| | 301A | SDE I/C | Senai–Desaru Expressway – Ulu Tiram, Kota Tinggi, Pasir Gudang, Bandar Penawar, Desaru | Trumpet interchange | 110 | |
| | BR | Saleng viaduct Sungai Skudai bridge Railway crossing bridge | | | 110 | |
| | 302 | Saleng viaduct Saleng I/C | FT 1 Skudai Highway – Saleng, Kulai | Ramp in/out to Senai Link | 110 | |
| 5.7 | 302A | Indahpura I/C; Johor Premium Outlets | Persiaran Indahpura – Indahpura, Johor Premium Outlets | Trumpet interchange | 110 | |
| | 304 | Senai South I/C | Second Link Expressway (Main Link) / AH143 – Gelang Patah, Bandar Nusajaya, Port of Tanjung Pelepas (PTP), Tuas (Singapore); North–South Expressway Southern Route / AH2 – Kuala Lumpur, Malacca, Skudai, Pasir Gudang, Johor Bahru | Trumpet interchange | 60 | |

=== Northern and Southern Links (Main Link) ===
The entire route is located in Johor.

| District | km | Exit | Name | Destinations | Type | Speed limit (km/h) | Notes |
|---|---|---|---|---|---|---|---|
| Kulai | | 253; 303 | Senai North I/C | North–South Expressway Southern Route / AH2 – Kuala Lumpur, Malacca, Skudai, Johor Bahru | | 60 | |
| Kulai | | T/P | Senai North Toll Plaza | Touch 'n Go Touch 'n Go SmartTAG MyRFID MyRFID SmartTAG Touch 'n Go Touch 'n Go | | 60 | |
| Kulai | | 304 | Senai South I/C | Second Link Expressway (Senai Link) Senai LInk – Senai International Airport, Senai, Kulai; Senai–Desaru Expressway – Ulu Tiram, Kota Tinggi, Pasir Gudang, Bandar Penawar, Desaru, Johor Premium Outlets | Trumpet interchange | 60 | |
| Kulai | | BR | Sungai Melana bridge | | | 110 | |
| Kulai | | 305 | Kangkar Pulai I/C | FT 5 Skudai–Pontian Highway – Kangkar Pulai, Skudai, Pontian | | 110 | |
| Johor Bahru | | T/P | Lima Kedai Toll Plaza | Touch 'n Go Touch 'n Go SmartTAG MyRFID MyRFID SmartTAG Touch 'n Go Touch 'n Go | | 60 | |
| Johor Bahru | | 306 | Lima Kedai I/C | J4 Jalan Gelang Patah–Skudai – Lima Kedai, Skudai, Mutiara Rini | | 110 | Future interchange |
| Johor Bahru | 15.3 | 307 | Pulai I/C | Second Link Expressway (Pontian-Johor Baharu Parkway) – Pontian, Pekan Nenas, Kukup, Tanjung Piai, Bukit Indah, Perling, Johor Bahru, Pasir Gudang | Cloverleaf interchange with direct ramp to Pasir Gudang | 110 | |
| Johor Bahru | | | Nusajaya-WCE | West Coast Expressway | | 110 | Under planning |
| Johor Bahru | | 311 | Iskandar Puteri I/C | Kota Iskandar Highway – Lima Kedai, Skudai, Nusajaya, Kota Iskandar, Legoland Malaysia | Cloverleaf interchange | 110 | |
| Johor Bahru | | 312 | Gelang Patah I/C | Kota Iskandar Highway – Gelang Patah, Pontian, Kukup, Tanjung Piai, Johor Bahru, Tampoi, Bukit Indah, Nusajaya, Kota Iskandar, Leisure Farm, Legoland Malaysia, Danga Bay | Cloverleaf interchange | 110 | |
| Johor Bahru | | 313A | Gerbang Nusajaya I/C | J4 Jalan Gelang Patah–Skudai – Gelang Patah, Gerbang Nusajaya, Leisure Farm | Trumpet interchange | 110 | |
| Johor Bahru | 5.7 | RSA | Gelang Patah RSA | Gelang Patah RSA – Petron Petronas TnG POS | | 110 | Northbound |
| Johor Bahru | 5.6 | 313 | Port of Tanjung Pelepas I/C | FT 177 Port of Tanjung Pelepas Highway – Port of Tanjung Pelepas (PTP), Pengkalan Marin Syahbandar, Tanjung Kupang, Pendas; FT 52 Iskandar Coastal Highway – Medini | Trumpet interchange | 110 | Last/First Malaysian exit |
| Johor Bahru | 4.8 | RSA | Gelang Patah RSA | Gelang Patah RSA – Shell Petron Petronas TnG POS | | 110 | Southbound |
| Johor Bahru | | T/P | Tanjung Kupang Toll Plaza | Touch 'n Go Touch 'n Go SmartTAG MyRFID MyRFID SmartTAG Touch 'n Go Touch 'n Go | | 60 | |
| Johor Bahru | | | Sultan Abu Bakar Complex | Immigration office, Customs office U-Turn with Toll Booth – Back to Malaysia via Second Link Expressway | | 60 | |
| Johor Bahru | | | Sultan Abu Bakar Custom Immigration and Quarantine Checkpoint (SAB) | Customs Immigration; Touch 'n Go Touch 'n Go; Immigration Customs | | 60 | |
| Johor Bahru | | | Sultan Abu Bakar Complex | U-Turn – Back to Singapore via Second Link Bridge | | 60 | |
| Johor Bahru | 0.5 | BR | Second Link Bridge | Malaysian approach span | | 90 | |
| Johor Bahru | 0.0 | BR | Second Link Bridge | Main navigational span | | 90 | |
ASEAN Malaysia–Singapore Border; Second Link Bridge; Through to AYE / AH143

=== Pontian-Johor Bahru Parkway (Pontian Link) ===
The entire route is in Johor Bahru District, Johor.

| km | Exit | Name | Destinations | Type | Speed limit (km/h) | Notes |
|---|---|---|---|---|---|---|
| 5.0 | 309A | Ulu Choh-Gelang Patah I/C | J7 Jalan Gelang Patah-Ulu Choh – Pontian, Ulu Choh, Kukup, Tanjung Piai, Gelang Patah, Nusajaya, Port of Tanjung Pelepas (PTP), Pendas | Interchange | 60 | |
| | 309 | Nusa Bayu I/C | Persiaran Nusa Bayu – Nusa Bayu, SILC Industrial Area | Diamond Interchange | 110 | |
| | 307 | Pulai I/C | Second Link Expressway (Main Link) / AH143 – Kuala Lumpur, Senai International Airport, Senai, Kulai, Gelang Patah, Nusajaya, Port of Tanjung Pelepas (PTP), Tuas (Singapore), Legoland Malaysia | Cloverleaf interchange with one direct ramp to Pasir Gudang | 110 | |
| | 308A | Nusa Indah I/C | Persiaran Nusa indah – Medini City , Nusa Bestari, Nusa Indah | Half diamond interchange | 110 | |
| | 308 | Bukit Indah I/C | Bukit Indah Highway – Bukit Indah, Nusajaya, Legoland Malaysia | Trumpet interchange | 110 | |
| | BR | Sungai Danga bridge | | | 110 | |
| | T/P | Perling Toll Plaza | Touch 'n Go Touch 'n Go SmartTAG MyRFID MyRFID SmartTAG Touch 'n Go Touch 'n Go | | 60 | |
Through to FT 17 Pasir Gudang Highway

== See also ==
- Johor–Singapore Causeway
- Malaysia–Singapore Second Link
- Pasir Gudang Highway
- Malaysian expressway system
