= Malaysia Federal Route 178 =

Road in Malaysia

Federal Route 178
- Jalan Cabang

Route information
- Maintained by Malaysian Public Works Department
- Length: 2.73 km (1.70 mi)
- Existed: 1996–present
- History: Completed in 1998

Major junctions
- Northwest end: Muara Sungai Pulai
- J4 Jalan Gelang Patah-Skudai; FT 177 Port of Tanjung Pelepas Highway
- Southeast end: FT 177 Port of Tanjung Pelepas Highway

Location
- Country: Malaysia
- Primary destinations: Port of Tanjung Pelepas; Pendas

Highway system
- Highways in Malaysia; Expressways; Federal; State

Jalan Cabang, Federal Route 178, is a continuous federal road in Johor, Malaysia. The Kilometre Zero of the Federal Route 178 starts at Port of Tanjung Pelepas Highway junctions.

== Features ==
At most sections, the Federal Route 178 was built under the JKR R5 road standard, allowing maximum speed limit of up to 90 km/h.

== List of junctions ==
Km	Exit	Junctions	To	Remarks
		Muara Sungai Pulai; Pangkalan Marin Syahbandar	Pangkalan Marin Syahbandar	
		Marine Department of Malaysia Southern Region Headquarters	Marine Department of Malaysia Southern Region Headquarters	
		Jalan Cabang bridge		Start/End of bridge
		Jalan Cabang bridge Railway crossing bridge		
		Jalan Cabang bridge Sungai Perpal bridge		
		Jalan Cabang bridge		Start/End of bridge
		J4 Jalan Gelang Patah-Skudai	J4 Jalan Gelang Patah-Skudai Southwest; Tanjung Kupang; Pendas NORTHEAST; Gelang Patah; Skudai	T-junctions
FT 178; 0		FT 177 Port of Tanjung Pelepas Highway	FT 177 Port of Tanjung Pelepas Highway West; FT 177 Port of Tanjung Pelepas Northeast; Second Link Expressway AH143 Second Link Expressway; North–South Expressway Southern Route AH2 Kuala Lumpur; FT 52 Johor Bahru; Second Link Expressway AH143 Tuas (Singapore)	T-junctions
