= Johor State Route J7 =

Road in Malaysia

Johor Route 7
- Jalan Tanjung Kupang

Major junctions
- North end: Ulu Choh
- FT 5 Skudai–Pontian Highway; Second Link Expressway; J4 State Route J4
- South end: Gelang Patah

Location
- Country: Malaysia
- Primary destinations: Pontian, Pekan Nenas, Iskandar Puteri

Highway system
- Highways in Malaysia; Expressways; Federal; State

Johor State Route J7 is a major road in Johor, Malaysia.

== Junction lists ==
The entire route is located in Johor Bahru District, Johor.

Legend:

- I/C - Interchange, I/S - Intersection, RSA - Rest and service area, OBR - Overhead bridge restaurant, R/R - Restaurant and rest plaza, L/B - Layby, V/P - Vista point, TN - tunnel, T/P - Toll plaza, BR - Bridge
- C - Cloverleaf, S - Stack, T-A - Trumpet-A, T-B - Trumpet-B, DT - Directional-T/Y, SDT - Semi-Directional-T/Y, P-Y - Partial-Y, D - Diamond, P-C - Partial cloverleaf, D-D - Diverging diamond, D-R - Direct ramp

Location	km	mi	Name	Destinations	Notes
Ulu Choh			Ulu Choh	FT 5 Old Road – Pekan Nanas, Pontian, Batu Pahat, Muar, Malacca, Skudai, Senai, Kulai, Johor Bahru	T-junctions
Ulu Choh			Skudai–Pontian Highway	FT 5 Skudai–Pontian Highway – Pontian, Pekan Nenas, Kukup, Tanjung Piai, Skudai, Senai, Kulai, Johor Bahru; North–South Expressway Southern Route / AH2 – Kuala Lumpur, Malacca	Junctions
Gelang Patah			Sungai Pulai bridge		
Gelang Patah			Pulai TNB Intake	Tenaga Nasional Berhad (TNB)-Pulai intake	
Gelang Patah			Pontian Link	Second Link Expressway (Pontian Link) – Johor Bahru, Pasir Gudang, Tuas (Singapore), Senai International Airport, Kuala Lumpur, Malacca	Interchange
Gelang Patah			Gelang Patah	J4 Johor State Route J4 – Iskandar Puteri, Skudai, Johor Bahru, Tanjung Kupang, Pendas, Port of Tanjung Pelepas Second Link Expressway / AH143 – Senai, Senai International Airport, Pasir Gudang, Johor Bahru, Tuas (Singapore), Kuala Lumpur, Malacca	T-junctions
1.000 mi = 1.609 km; 1.000 km = 0.621 mi
