= Lima Kedai =

Other transcription(s)
  - Jawi: ليما كداي
  - Chinese: 五间店; Wǔ Jiān Diàn
  - Tamil: லீமா கெடாய் Līmā keṭāy (Transliteration)
- Location within Johor Location within Peninsular Malaysia Location within Malaysia
- Coordinates: 1°30′8.0294″N 103°37′2.7444″E
- Negara: Malaysia
- Negeri: Johor
- District: Johor Bahru

Lima Kedai (Jawi: ليما كداي; Chinese: 五间店; lit. 'Five Shops') is an area in Iskandar Puteri, Johor Bahru District, Johor, Malaysia. It is located between Skudai and Gelang Patah. Lima Kedai is an important transit town for travellers on the Second Link Expressway.
