= Ulu Choh =

Coordinates: 1°32′N 103°33′E

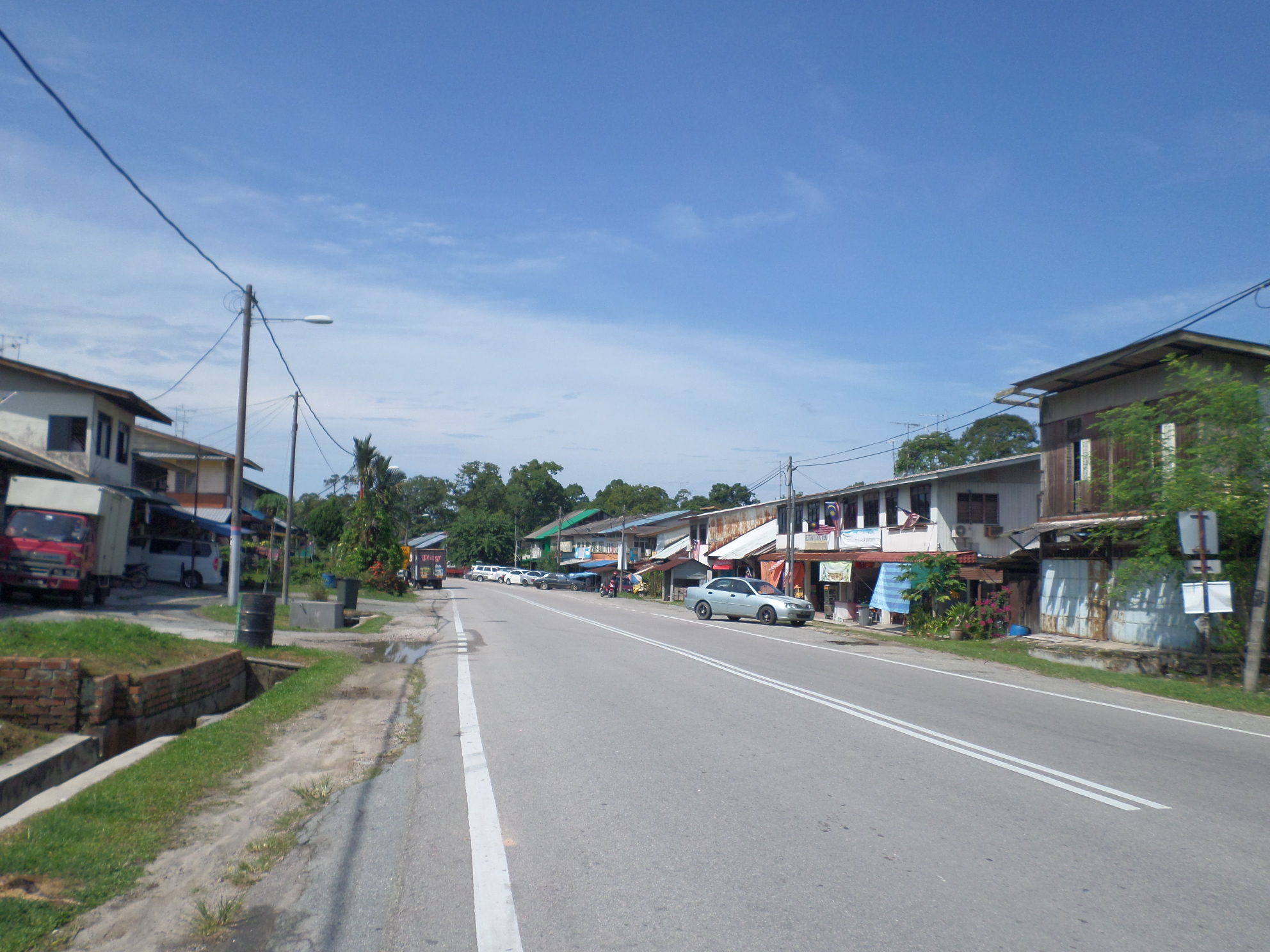
- Interactive map of Ulu Choh
- Country: Malaysia

Ulu Choh is a small town in Iskandar Puteri, Kulai District, Johor, Malaysia. It is located near the border of Pontian district.

== History ==
About 50 years ago, Ulu Choh was a dense forest hideaway. The government encouraged residents around the area to take part in agricultural activities such as rubber tree and vegetable cultivation.

At the same time, Singapore required a water supply from Johor. PUB Singapore opened a branch in Ulu Choh to process its own water supply. The opening of the PUB branch caused an influx of people and the formation of a small village that was later known as Batu 22, Jalan Kolam Air.

Kampung Ulu Choh was formed in 1951 and in early 1953, Batu 22 was declared as the Ulu Choh Local Council. The government then appointed locals as councilors. The first chairman of the local council was Kok Yin Khian, followed by Kok Kim Hee.

In 1959, the first Ulu Choh Local Council election was held to select a local authority.

In June 2013 an extreme sport park was created, known as Ulu Choh Dirt Park.

In 2014, several industrial factories opened in Ulu Choh Industrial Park.
