= Taman Scientex =

Human settlement in Malaysia

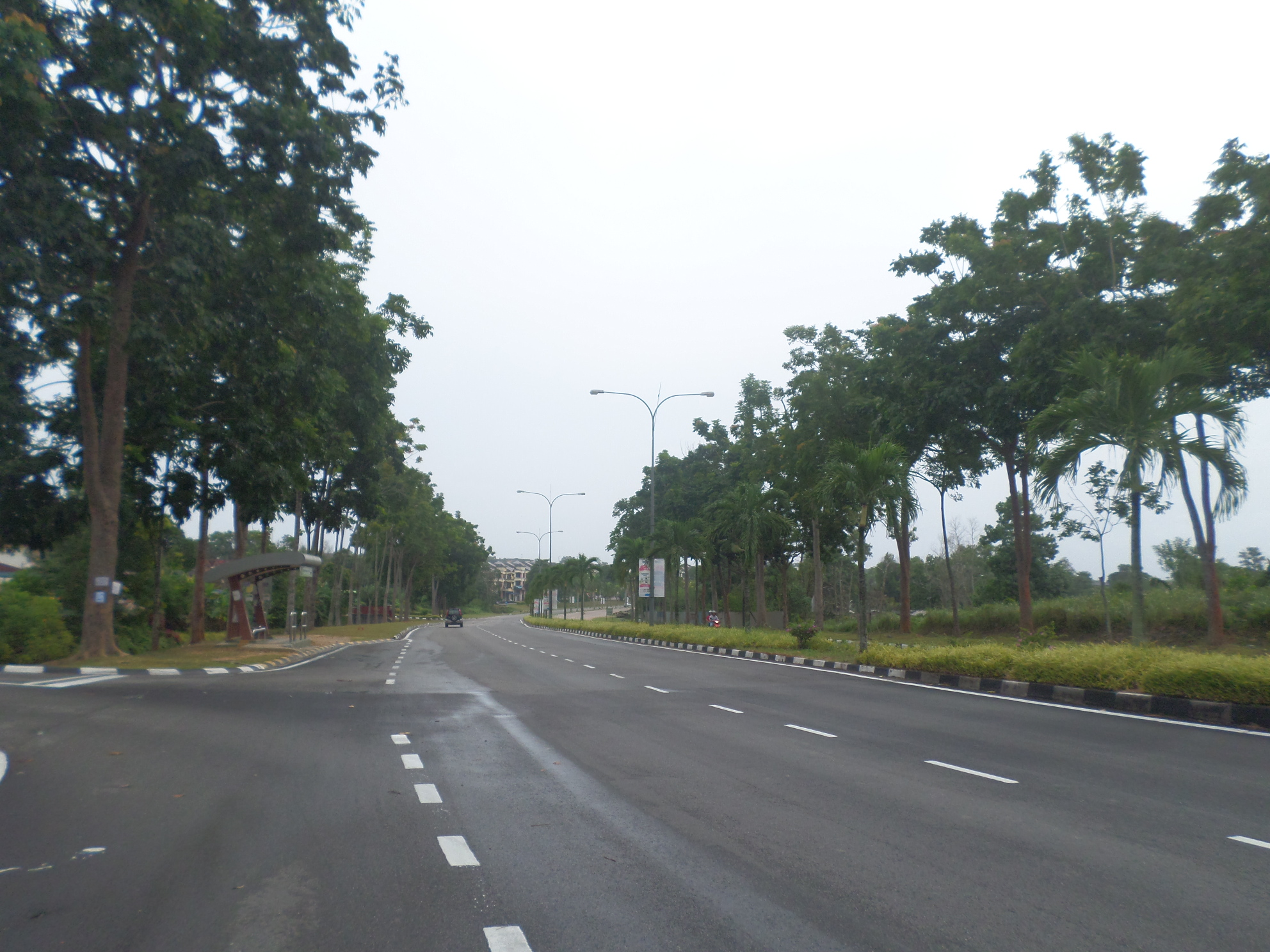
Taman Scientex

Taman Scientex (Jawi: تامن سچياينتيقس; Chinese: 森德综合镇) is a township in Pasir Gudang, Johor, Malaysia. This township is located between Masai and Pasir Gudang.
