= Sultan Abu Bakar Complex =

Complex in Tanjung Kupang, Johor, Malaysia

Coordinates: 1.3778028°N 103.5963803°E

Sultan Abu Bakar Complex Kompleks Sultan Abu Bakar کومڤليکس سلطان ابو بکر
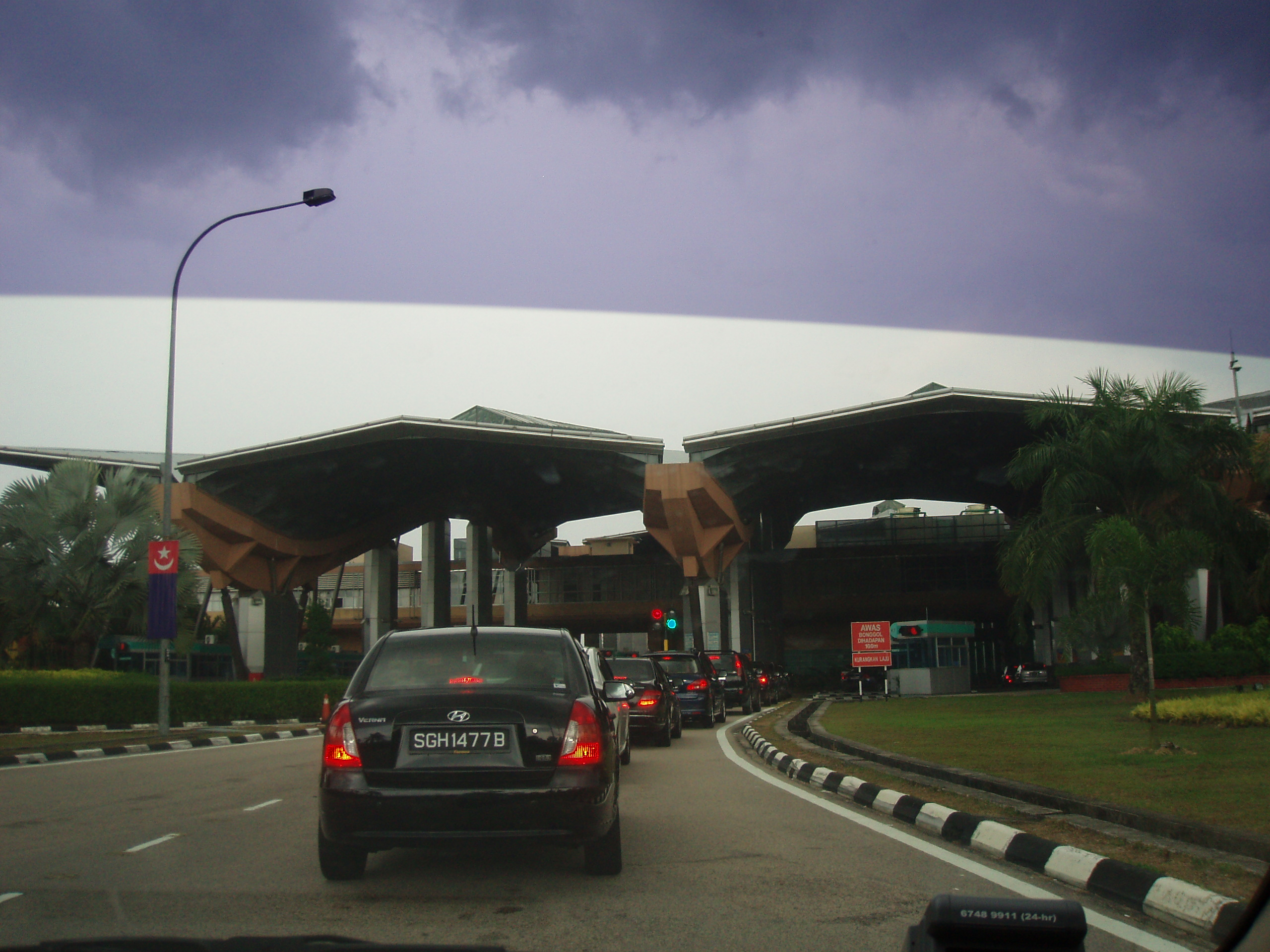

General information
- Type: Customs, Immigration and Quarantine (CIQ) Complex
- Location: Kampung Ladang, Tanjung Kupang, Johor, Malaysia
- Owner: Primary operators Government of Malaysia; Malaysian Highway Authority (MHA); Malaysian Public Works Department (JKR) Secondary operators Department of Immigration Malaysia; Royal Customs Department Malaysia; Malaysian Road Transport Department; PLUS Malaysia Berhad (Projek Lebuhraya Usahasama Berhad); Royal Malaysian Police

Design and construction
- Developer: Malaysian Highway Authority (MHA); Malaysian Public Works Department (JKR); United Engineers Malaysia Berhad

The Sultan Abu Bakar Complex (KSAB; Malay: Kompleks Sultan Abu Bakar; Jawi: کومڤليکس سلطان ابو بکر) is a customs, immigration and quarantine (CIQ) complex in Tanjung Kupang, Iskandar Puteri, Johor, Malaysia. Located at the northern end of the Malaysia–Singapore Second Link, it is one of the two land ports of entry to Malaysia on the Malaysia–Singapore border.

The CIQ complex is named after Sultan Abu Bakar of Johor. From Malaysia, vehicular access is provided by the Second Link Expressway, continuing after border inspection onto the Second Link bridge to Tuas Checkpoint in Tuas, Singapore. Pedestrians are not permitted on the Second Link; as a result, there is no pedestrian access to or from the complex.

== Components ==
=== Immigration Checkpoint ===
The immigration checkpoint has different checkpoints for motorcycles and cars. The checkpoint was designed with 78 counters for cars entering Malaysia, and 39 counters for those departing from Malaysia. There are 50 counters in each direction for motorcycles entering and departing Malaysia. The Secured Automated Clearance System for Malaysian Citizen Motorcyclists (M-BIKE) is provided here for all Malaysian citizen motorcyclists.

Buses and coaches drop passengers outside separate buildings on both sides of the immigration checkpoint; after clearing entry or exit immigration checks depending on the direction of travel, passengers board the same vehicle that dropped them off.

=== Customs Checkpoint ===
At the customs checkpoint, 36 counters are designated for cars (20 for those arriving in Malaysia and 16 for those leaving the country) and 25 for motorcycles (17 for arrivals and 8 for departures).

=== KSAB Quarters ===
Near the complex is the KSAB quarters housing for Malaysian immigration and customs staff and have two schools Sekolah Kebangsaan Kompleks Sultan Abu Bakar (SKKSAB) primary schools and Sekolah Menengah Kebangsaan Kompleks Sultan Abu Bakar (SMKKSAB) secondary schools.
