= Taman Ungku Tun Aminah =

Coordinates: 1°31′N 103°40′E

- Suburb of Iskandar Puteri
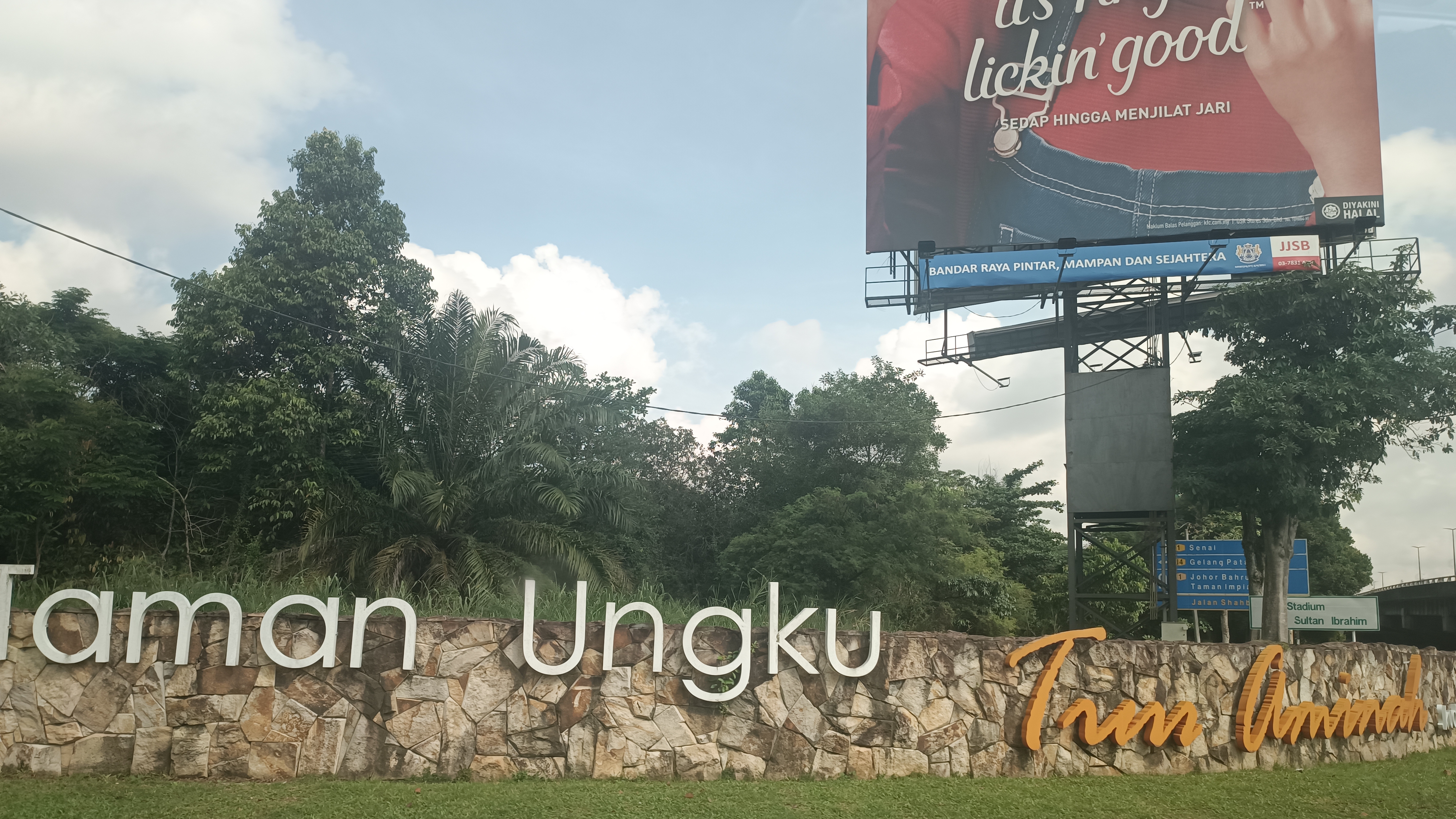

- Location within Iskandar Malaysia

Taman Ungku Tun Aminah (Jawi: تامن اوڠكو تون امينه; Chinese: 皇后花园, abbreviated as "TUTA") is a suburb in Skudai, Iskandar Puteri, Johor Bahru District, Johor, Malaysia. It was erected in the 1980s and is named after Sultanah Tun Aminah.

== Transportation ==
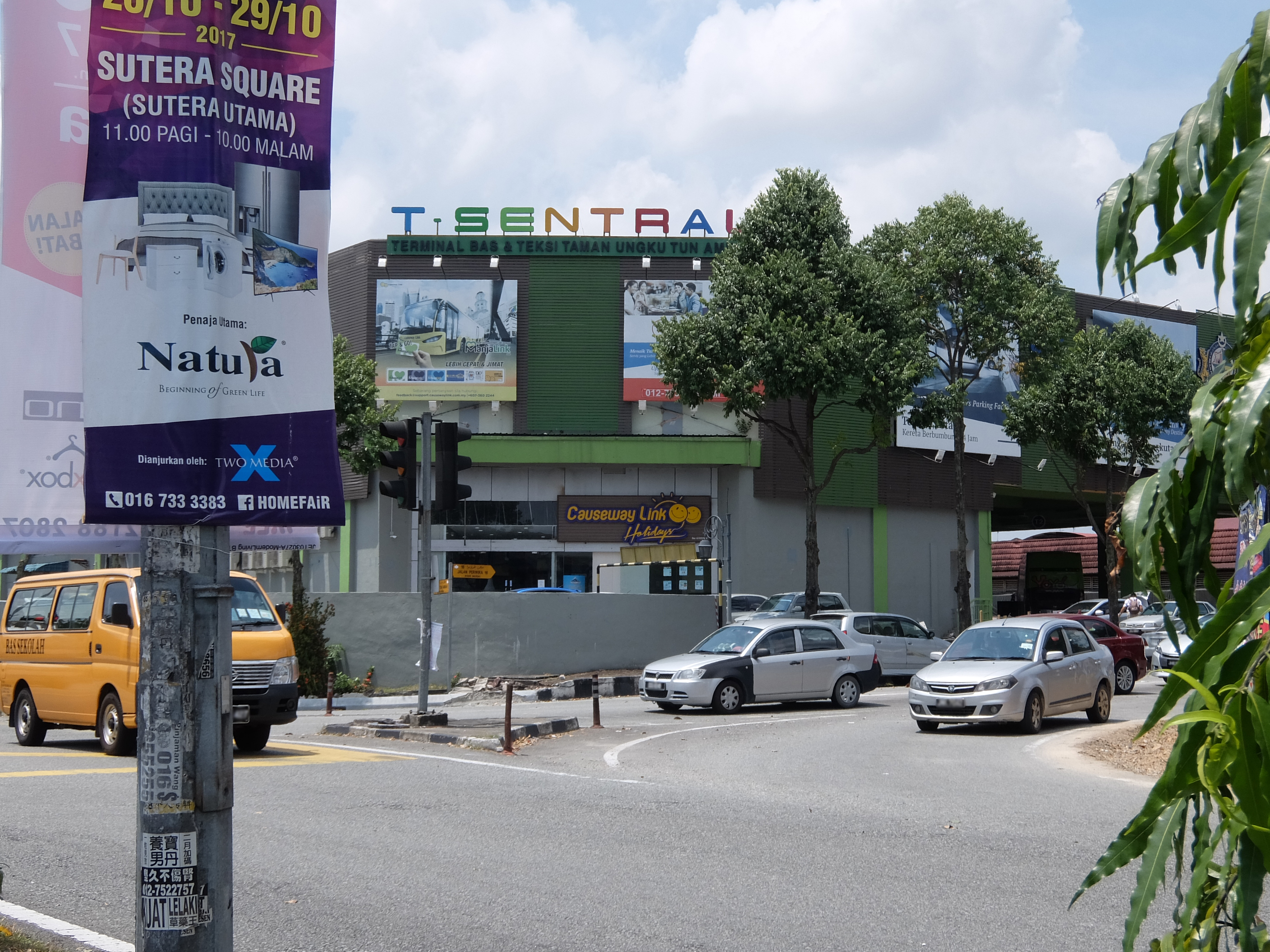
Taman Ungku Tun Aminah Bus and Taxi Terminal

The suburb houses the Taman Ungku Tun Aminah bus and taxi terminal. The area is accessible by Muafakat Bus route P-202. or by Causeway Link route T32 from Johor Bahru Sentral railway station to Bandar Selesa Jaya.

== Shopping ==
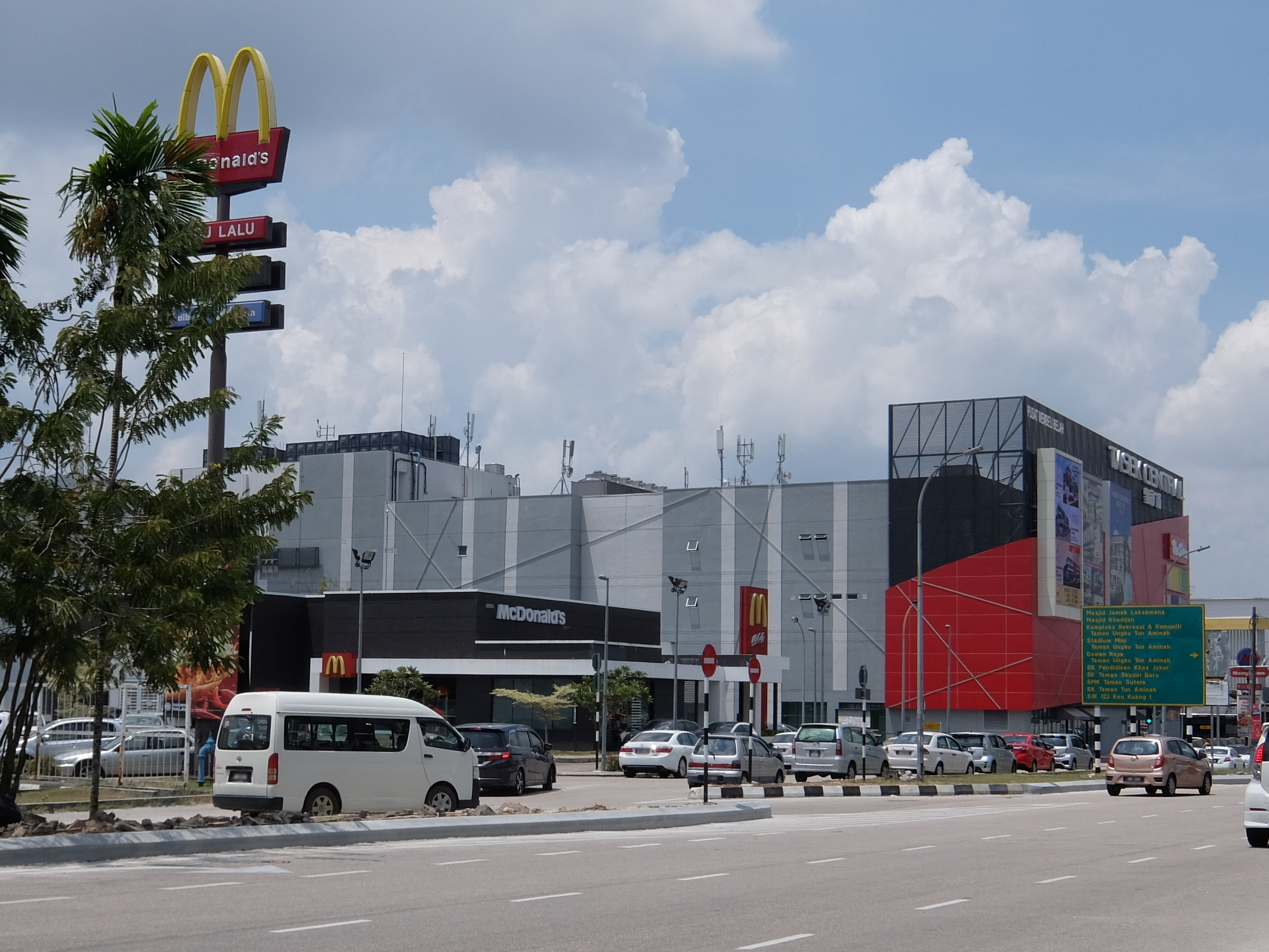
Tasek Sentral, formerly known as Plaza Tasek

- Tasek Central Mall
