= Mutiara Rini =

Taman Mutiara Rini
- Township in Iskandar Puteri
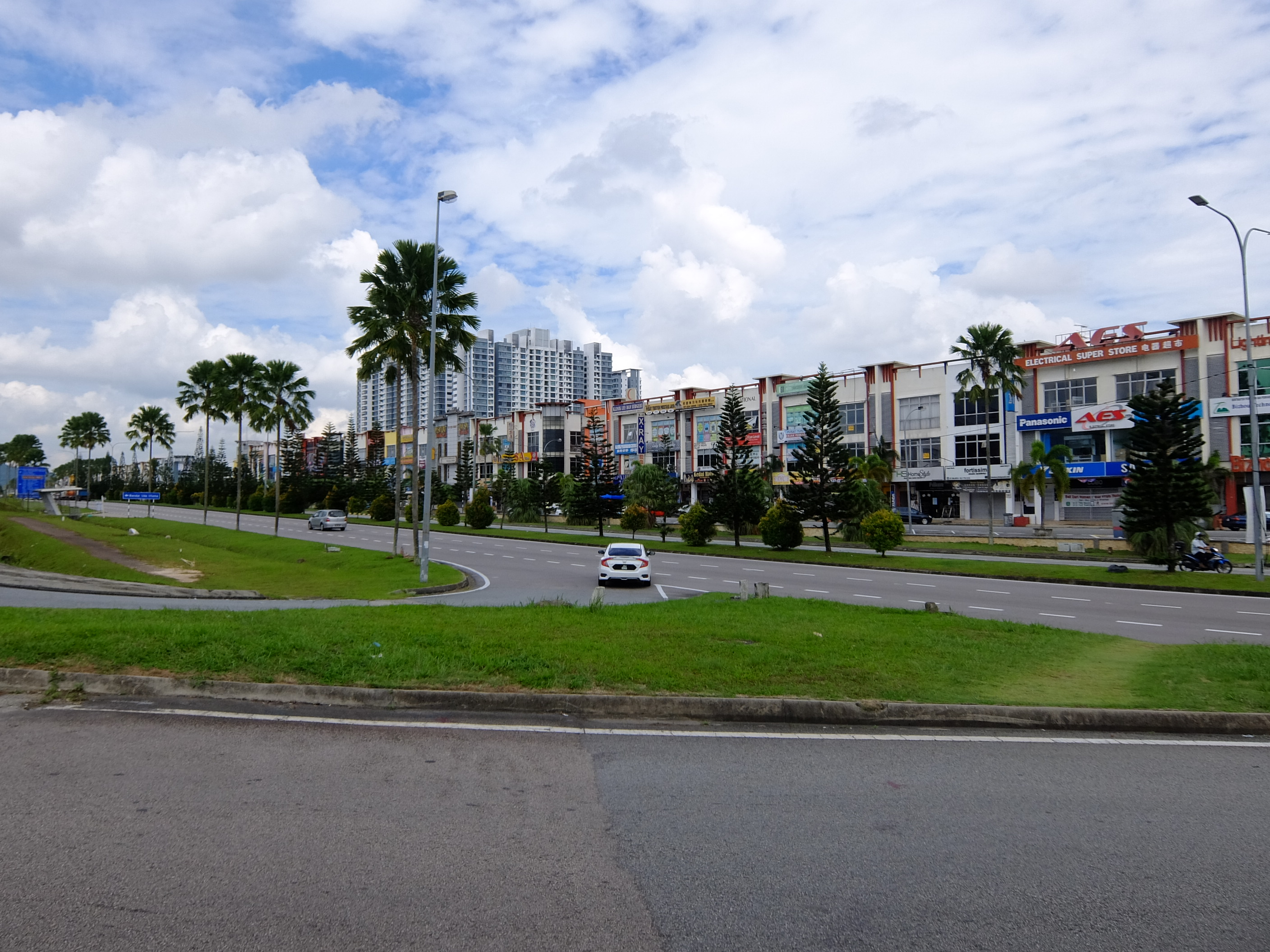
- Nickname: MR
- Motto: Hanya Kerana Allah
- Coordinates: 1°31′28″N 103°38′25″E
- Country: Malaysia
- State: Johor
- District: Johor Bahru
- City: Iskandar Puteri

Mutiara Rini is a housing area and suburb in Iskandar Puteri, Johor, Malaysia. It is developed by Mutiara Rini Sdn Bhd, a subsidiary of the military-linked Boustead Group.

== History ==
This township began development in 1996. Previously it was known as Rini Estate which mainly contained oil palms.

== Location ==
It is located in Skudai town, Iskandar Puteri City which is about 13 km northwest from Johor Bahru City Centre and is easily accessible by way of Skudai Highway (part of the Kuala Lumpur-Johor Bahru highway).

== Notable people ==
- Liew Chin Tong

== Grand Mosque And Small Mosque ==
- Masjid Al Jawahir Mutiara Rini (Mosque)
- Surau Mutiara Aula (Small Mosque)
- Surau Mutiara Iman (Small Mosque)
- Surau Jasa (Small Mosque)
- Surau Jauharul Muttaqin (Small Mosque)
- Surau Jauharul Muhsinin (Small Mosque)

== National School ==
- SJK(C) Thorburn
- SMK Taman Mutiara Rini
- SMK Taman Mutiara Rini 2
- SK Taman Mutiara Rini 2
- SK Taman Mutiara Rini
- SJK (T) Ladang Rini

== Islamic school ==
- SA Nurratun Nasihin (Taman Mutiara Rini)

== Housing Division ==
- Rini Hills & Rini Hills 2
- Presint Bakti
- Rini Homes 1-7
- Indah Heights
- Presint Jasa
- Pangsapuri Jasa
- Presint Utama
