= Pendas, Malaysia =

Village in Malaysia

Coordinates: 1°22′27″N 103°37′52″E

Pendas or Kangkar Pendas (Chinese: 谢厝港) is a fisherman village in Gelang Patah, Iskandar Puteri, Johor Bahru District, Johor, Malaysia.
