= AH143 =

Road in Asia

Asian Highway 143

Route information
- Length: 38 km (24 mi)

Major junctions
- South end: Sengkang, Singapore
- North end: Senai, Johor, Malaysia

Location
- Countries: Malaysia, Singapore

Highway system
- Asian Highway Network
| ← AH142 | → AH150 |

The Asian Highway 143 AH143 is part of the Asian Highway Network. It connects from Buangkok East Drive (Sengkang) all the way to Senai North Interchange.

== Singapore ==
- Kallang–Paya Lebar Expressway
- Marina Coastal Expressway
- Ayer Rajah Expressway

== Malaysia ==
- Second Link Expressway (Previously AH2), completion of Johor Bahru Eastern Dispersal Link Expressway (EDL) in 2012, AH2 re-routed to EDL.
