= Gelang Patah =

- Suburb of Iskandar Puteri

Malay transcription(s)
  - Rumi: Gelang Patah
  - Jawi: ڬلڠ ڤاته

Chinese transcription(s)
  - Traditional: 振林山
  - Simplified: 振林山
  - Mandarin: Zhènlínshān (Pinyin)
  - Tamil: கேலாங் பாத்தா Kēlāṅ pāttā (Transliteration)
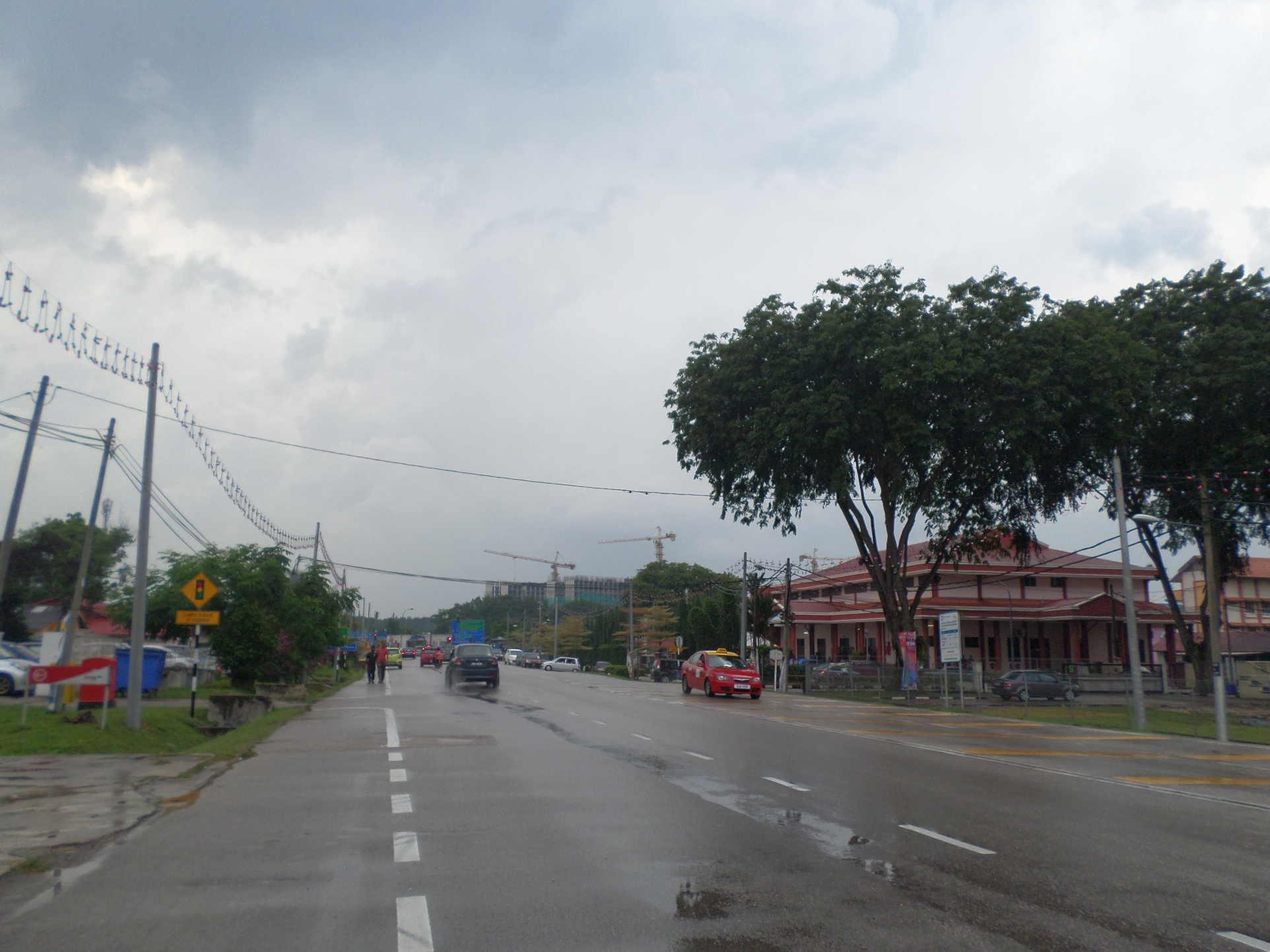

- Location in Malaysia
- Coordinates: 1.4491332°N 103.5899353°E
- Country: Malaysia
- State: Johor
- District: Johor Bahru

Government
  - Local Authority: Iskandar Puteri City Council
  - Mayor: YB Tuan Haji Ahmad Nazir bin Haji Mohd Nasir
- Time zone: UTC+8 (MST)
- Postcode: 81550
- Dialling code: +607
- Police: Iskandar Puteri
- Fire: Iskandar Puteri

Gelang Patah is a town in Iskandar Puteri, Johor Bahru District, Johor, Malaysia. It was administered by ruling coalition, Barisan Nasional (BN) for over 5 decades until the 13th Malaysian General Elections. BN lost to the opposition, Pakatan Harapan in the 14th General Election as well as the 15th.

One of its schools, Sekolah Menengah Kebangsaan Gelang Patah is the oldest school in Iskandar Puteri and accredited as a Trust School by its government. A trust school is managed jointly by Yayasan AMIR, and civil service principals and headmasters under the umbrella of the Ministry of Education to improve student outcomes and school management capabilities.

The town is a home to a container port, Port of Tanjung Pelepas (PTP). PTP is situated on the eastern mouth of the Pulai River in south-western Gelang Patah, Johor, Malaysia, in close proximity to the Straits of Johor, which separates the countries of Malaysia and Singapore and the Strait of Malacca.

3 kilometre away from PTP lies a controversial mega project, Forest City. Forest City is an integrated residential development and private town located in Iskandar Puteri, Johor, Malaysia on a land 1,370 hectares wide. First announced in 2006 as a twenty-year project, the project was pitched under China's Belt and Road Initiative.

The town is also well-known for its otak-otak which is steamed or grilled cake made from a paste made from fish or a wide selection of seafood.

== Politics ==
There are 2 constituencies under Gelang Patah Parliamentary which makes the total voters for this Chinese populated area is about 92 thousand people.

In 2013 general election, Barisan Nasional fielded the incumbent Johor Menteri Besar, Abdul Ghani Othman to contest in Gelang Patah against Democratic Action Party Supremo, Lim Kit Siang, a two-term member of parliament for Ipoh Timur. Lim won the election with a majority of 14,762 votes, defeating Abdul Ghani who captured 39,522 votes.

The DAP veteran then expressed disappointment over Prime Minister Najib Abdul Razak's decision not to admit former Johor "Menteri Besar" Abdul Ghani Othman into his new cabinet.

It is most unfair and ungrateful for Umno leaders to drop Ghani like a tonne of bricks after he failed to defeat me in Gelang Patah," said Lim.

Sime Darby said Ghani will be appointed as an independent and non-executive director. He had served as the Johor "Menteri Besar" for four terms lasting 18 years.

In the last general election in 2008, Barisan's Tan Ah Eng from the MCA retained the Gelang Patah seat by 8,851-vote majority. defeating Parti Keadilan Rakyat's (PKR) Dr Zaleha Mustafa who captured 24, 779 votes, a strong sign that the opposition is making its way.

== Administration ==
Kota Iskandar in Iskandar Puteri, the new administration center for Johor Bahru replacing Bukit Timbalan in the heart of Johor is undergoing rapid developments. Multiple large-scale projects were kick-started by the 5th Prime Minister Abdullah Badawi and the town subsequently became a gold mine for ambitious international brands such as Legoland, Hotel Jen Puteri Harbour, San Rio Hello Kitty Town and Frost & Sullivan to benefit from the Iskandar Development Territory. Abdullah's intention was to generate massive Foreign Direct Investment especially from neighbouring country, Singapore, and also the middle eastern countries.

With the target to inflow more than RM100 billion FDI under the belt of Iskandar Region Development Authority (IRDA) and with the help of the Federal Government investment arm, Khazanah Nasional Berhad and the Johor State Government, Gelang Patah significantly shifted from being a shantytown to a town of opportunity as it became flooded by foreign companies, foreign forces and expatriates. However, this resulted in an increase in living costs in Gelang Patah.

== Transportation ==
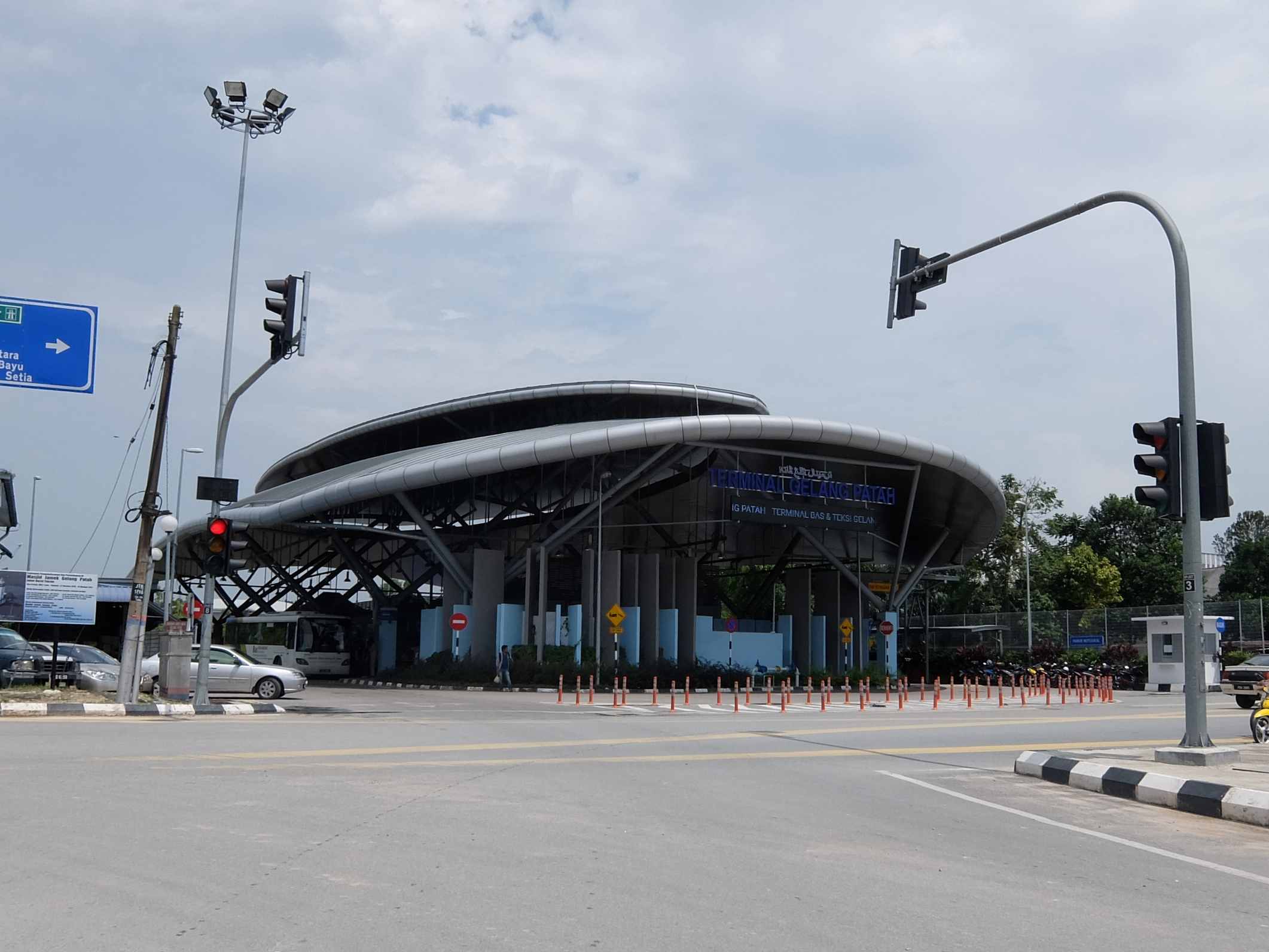
Gelang Patah terminal

Bus terminals in Gelang Patah are the GP Sentral and Gelang Patah bus terminals.

== Residences ==
Forest City is a real estate megaproject on the slopes of Gelang Patah. It is an integrated residential development and private town.

== Education ==
=== Primary school ===
- Sekolah Kebangsaan Tiram Duku
- Sekolah Kebangsaan Tanjung Kupang
- Sekolah Kebangsaan Tanjong Adang
- Sekolah Kebangsaan Taman Nusa Perintis
- Sekolah Kebangsaan Sikijang
- Sekolah Kebangsaan Pendas Laut
- Sekolah Kebangsaan Nusantara
- Sekolah Kebangsaan Morni Pok
- Sekolah Kebangsaan Ladang Pendas
- Sekolah Kebangsaan Kompleks Sultan Abu Bakar
- Sekolah Kebangsaan Kampung Pulai
- Sekolah Kebangsaan Gelang Patah
- Sekolah Jenis Kebangsaan (Tamil) Gelang Patah
- Sekolah Jenis Kebangsaan (Cina) Ming Terk
- Sekolah Jenis Kebangsaan (Cina) Pai Tze

=== Secondary school ===
- Sekolah Menengah Kebangsaan Tanjung Adang
- Sekolah Menengah Kebangsaan Taman Nusajaya
- Sekolah Menengah Kebangsaan Kompleks Sultan Abu Bakar
- Sekolah Menengah Kebangsaan Gelang Patah

== See also ==
- Iskandar Malaysia
- Iskandar Puteri
- Kota Iskandar
- Nusa Bayu
