= Mukim Pulai, Johor =

Pulai Mukim Pulai

Other transcription(s)
  - Jawi: ڤولاي
  - Chinese: 蒲來
  - Tamil: வேளை

- Location within Malaysia
- Coordinates: 1°32′00″N 103°40′00″E
- Country: Malaysia
- State: Johor
- District: Johor Bahru District
- Municipality: Iskandar Puteri City Council; Johor Bahru City Council
- Electorate: P161 Pulai; N46 Perling; N47 Kempas; P162 Iskandar Puteri; N49 Kota Iskandar; N48 Skudai
- Time zone: UTC+8 (MST)
  - Summer (DST): Not observed

Pulai or Mukim Pulai is the largest mukim in District of Johor Bahru, State of Johor Darul Ta'zim, Federation of Malaysia.

== Name ==
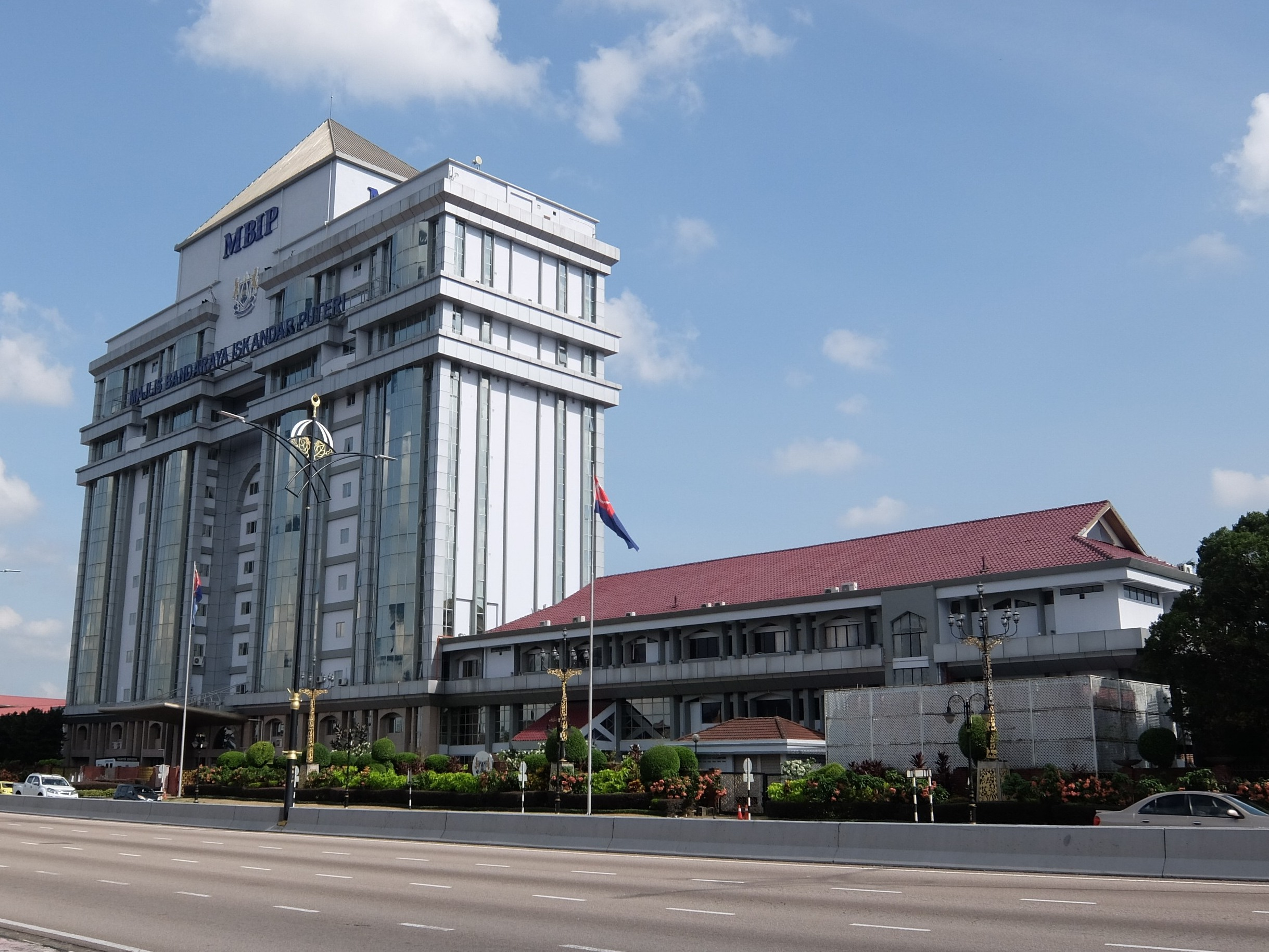
Iskandar Puteri City Council office in Skudai

Mukim Pulai was named after Pulai River. Pulai is a species of tree (sp. Alstonia angustiloba). The tree can be found in abundance at Mount Pulai where Pulai River come from.

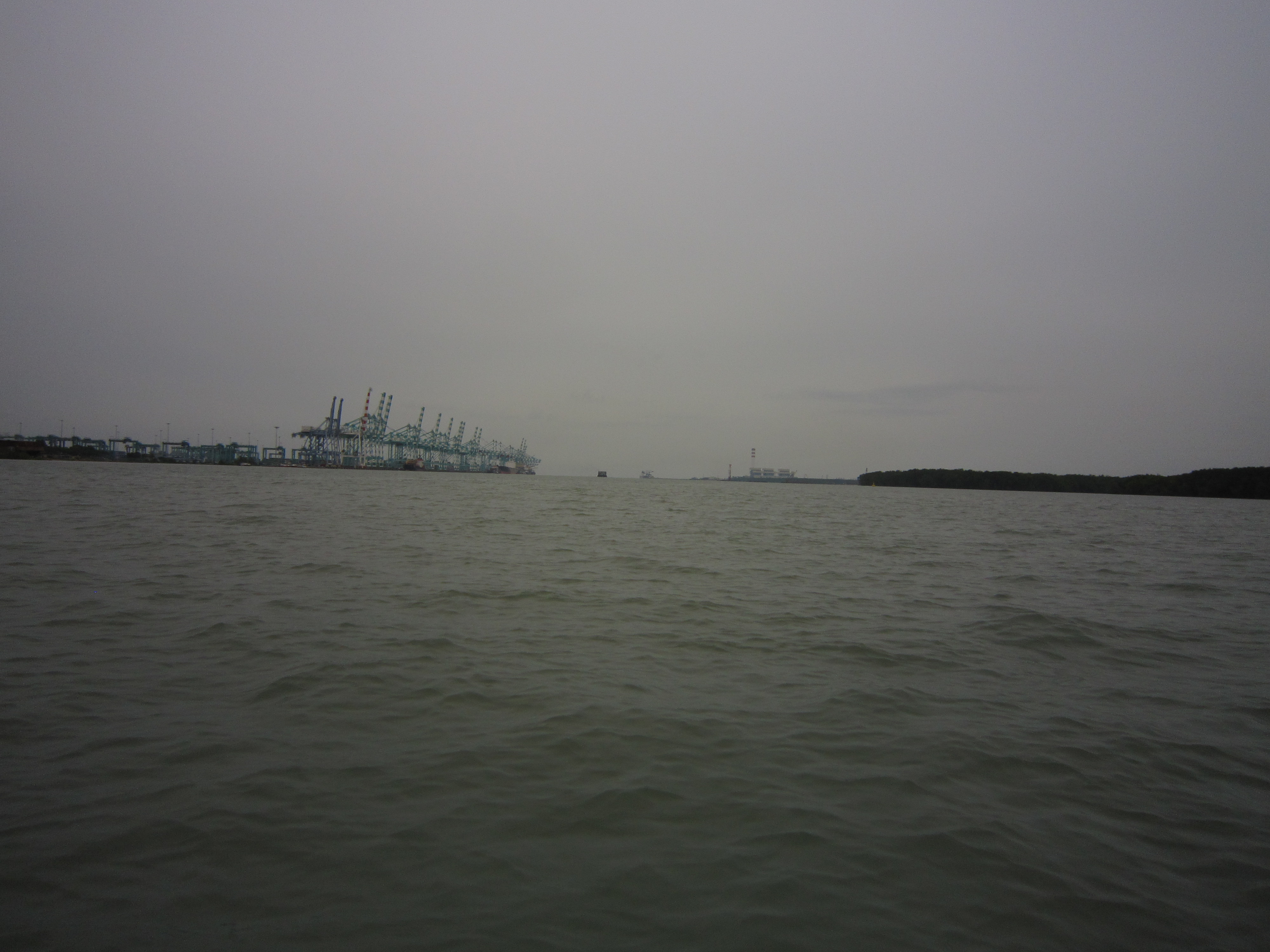
Pulai River

== Geography ==
The mukim spans over an area of 520 km^{2}.

== Administrative Centre ==
Pulai host most of Federal and State government and agencies in district Johor Bahru.

- Federal Government's headquarters, Wisma Persekutuan at Jalan Air Molek
- Johor State Administrative Centre, Kota Iskandar
- Former Johor Bahru City Council's headquarter at Jalan Tun Razak
- Former Iskandar Puteri City Council's headquarter at Jalan Skudai
- New Iskandar Puteri City Council's headquarter at Medini
- Johor Official Royal Palace, Istana Serene at Serene Hill
- Johor Official Royal Palace, Istana Besar
- Johor Government Building, Sultan Ibrahim Building at Timbalan Hill
- Johor Islamic Center, Pusat Islam Iskandar at Mahmoodiah Hill

== Transportation ==
The area is easily accessible via CIQ or Senai Airport. It is accessible by Muafakat Bus route P-403. or Causeway Link (5B, 51B) from Johor Bahru Sentral railway station.

== See also ==
- Johor Bahru
- Iskandar Puteri
- Pulai Mutiara, Johor
- Pulai Indah, Johor
- Pulai Hijauan, Johor
- Bandar Baru Kangkar Pulai
- Kangkar Pulai
