= Gambier =

Gambier may refer to:

== People ==
=== Given name ===
- Gambier Bolton (1854–1928), English photographer

=== Surname ===
- Edward John Gambier (1794–1879), British colonial judge
- Gloucester Gambier (1812–1872), English first-class cricketer and British Army officer
- James Gambier (Royal Navy officer) (1723–1789), British vice-admiral
- James Gambier, 1st Baron Gambier (1756–1833), British admiral also known as Lord Gambier
- Maurice Gambier d'Hurigny (1912-2000), French sculptor

== Places ==
- Gambier Islands (South Australia), Australia
- Gambier Island, British Columbia, Canada
- Gambier Islands, French Polynesia
- Gambier (commune), French Polynesia
- Gambier, Ohio, United States

== Other uses ==
- Uncaria gambir, a species of tropical shrub
- Gambier (extract), made from Uncaria gambir

== See also ==
- Gambir (disambiguation)
- Mount Gambier (disambiguation)
