= Pulai =

Pulai ڤولاي
- Towns and Suburbs
- Flag

- Pulai shown within Johor Bahru.
- Coordinates: 1°32′00″N 103°40′00″E
- Country: Malaysia
- State: Johor
- District: Johor Bahru
- City: Iskandar Puteri
- Mukim: Pulai
- Opening: 1917

Government
  - Local Authority: Majlis Bandaraya Iskandar Puteri
  - ADUN: YB Sr Dzulkefly Ahmad
  - Mayor: Dato' Salehuddin bin Hassan
  - Penghulu: Zainuddin
  - Ketua Kampung: Adnan Ladimin
- Time zone: UTC+8 (MST)
- Postcode: 81300 Johor Bahru
- Dialling code: +607 (Johor)
- Police: Kangkar Pulai Police Station
- Fire: Iskandar Puteri Fire Station

Pulai is a suburban area in the city of Iskandar Puteri, Mukim Pulai, district Johor Bahru, state of Johor, Malaysia

== Name ==
Pulai was named after Pulai River. Pulai is a species of tree (sp. Alstonia angustiloba). The tree can be found in abundance at Mount Pulai where Pulai River come from.

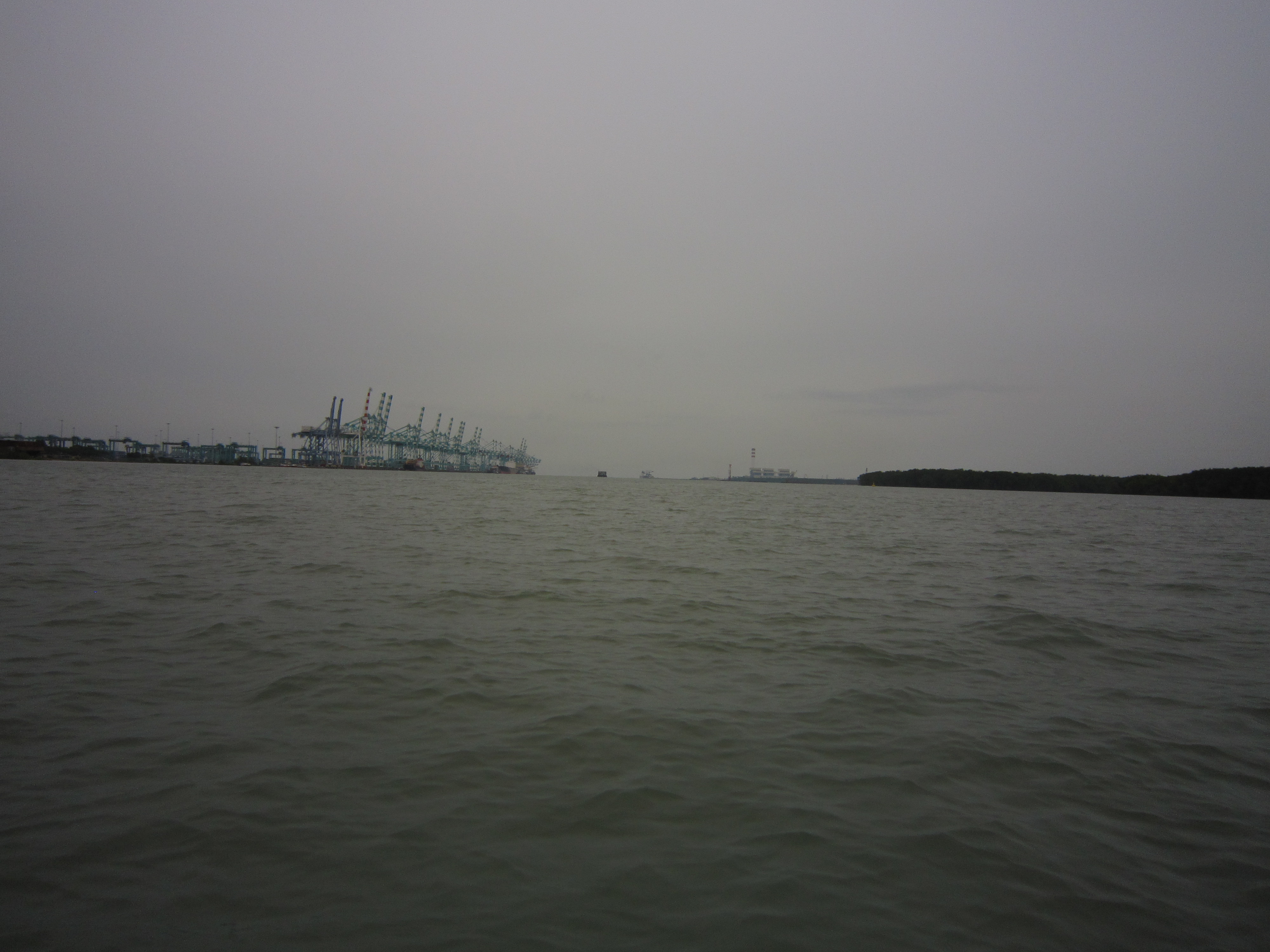
Pulai River

== List of development in Pulai ==
- Taman Pulai Mutiara
- Taman Pulai Indah
- Taman Perling
- Kangkar Pulai
- Gelang Patah
- Iskandar Puteri
- Horizon Hills
- Mutiara Rini
- Bukit Indah
- Taman Unversiti
- Taman Pulai Hijauan
- Taman Pulai Makmur (BBKP)
- Taman Pulai Ria (BBKP)
- Taman Pulai Mesra (BBKP)
- Taman Pulai Tuah (BBKP)
- Taman Pulai Ceria (BBKP)
- Taman Pulai Bestari (BBKP)
- Taman Pulai Emas
- Bandar Pulai Jaya
- Taman Sri Pulai Perdana
- Taman Sri Pulai Perdana 2
- Taman Sri Pulai
- Taman Teratai
- Taman Desa Permai
- Taman Nusa Bestari
- Tanan Ungku Tun Aminah

== List of Villages in Pulai ==
- Kampung Melayu Kangkar Pulai
- Kangkar Pulai Old Town
- Kampung Nesa
- Kampung Ladang Keck Seng
