= Gambir =

Gambir may refer to:

- Uncaria gambir, a tropical shrub
  - Gambier, an astringent extract made from Uncaria gambir
- Gambir, a Mongolian layered fried bread also known as kattama

Places

- Gambir, Jakarta, Indonesia
  - Gambir, Gambir, administrative village within the Gambir subdistrict
  - Gambir railway station, major railway station in Gambir, Jakarta
  - Gambir Market, market held in 1906 and yearly from 1921 until 1942 in Jakarta
- Bukit Gambir, Malaysia
- Gambir, a state seat of the Johor State Legislative Assembly

== See also ==
- Gambier, preferred English spelling of the Malay word gambir
- Gambira, Burmese Buddhist monk
- Gambhir, an Indian name
- Gambhir River (disambiguation)
