= Bandar Baru Kangkar Pulai =

Bandar Baru Kangkar Pulai بندر بهارو کڠکر ڤولاي
- Township
- Flag Seal

- Bandar Baru Kangkar Pulai shown within Johor
- Coordinates: 1°32′00″N 103°40′00″E
- Country: Malaysia
- State: Johor
- District: Johor Bahru
- City: Iskandar Puteri
- Mukim: Pulai

Government
  - Type: Administered by two local authorities
  - Local Authority: Majlis Bandaraya Iskandar Puteri and Majlis Perbandaran Kulai
- Time zone: UTC+8 (MST)
- Postcode: 81110
- Dialling code: +607
- Police: Kangkar Pulai Police Station
- Fire: Iskandar Puteri Fire Station

Bandar Baru kangkar Pulai (بندر بهارو کڠکر ڤولاي) is a township at the border of mukim Senai, district of Kulai, State of Johor Darul Ta'zim and mukim Pulai, city of Iskandar Puteri, district of Johor Bahru, State of Johor Darul Ta'zim, Malaysia. The township is bordered by Pulai Hijauan to the west, Kangkar Pulai and Taman Pulai Mas to the east, and Pulai Indah to the south. The rest area on it perimeter is covered in green. This township is being developed by Keck Seng since 2008, and ready for occupation from 2010 onward.

== Development Phasing ==
=== Developments in Mukim Pulai ===
1. Taman Pulai Bestari
2. Taman Pulai Makmur (Amber Hill)

=== Developments in Mukim Senai ===
1. Taman Pulai Ria
2. Taman Pulai Tuah (Fortune Hill and Cube on Hill)
3. Taman Pulai Mesra
4. Taman Pulai Ceria (Sapphire Hill)

== Institutional ==
=== School ===
1. Sekolah Menengah Kebangsaan Kangkar Pulai
2. Sekolah Kebangsaan Kangkar Pulai 2
3. Sekolah Jenis Kebangsaan Tamil Kangkar Pulai
4. Sekolah Jenis Kebangsaan Cina Woon Hua

=== Mosque ===
Surau At-Taqwa in Taman Pulai Bestari
Surau At-Taubah in Taman Pulai Mesra

== See also ==
- Iskandar Puteri
- Pulai Mutiara
- Pulai Indah, Johor
- Pulai Hijauan, Johor
- Kangkar Pulai
