= Taman Pulai Mutiara =

Pulai Mutiara ڤــــولاي مـــتـيارا
- Township
- Flag Seal

- Pulai Mutiara shown within Johor
- Coordinates: 1°32′00″N 103°40′00″E
- Country: Malaysia
- State: Johor
- District: Johor Bahru
- City: Iskandar Puteri
- Mukim: Pulai
- Opening: 2018

Government
  - Local Authority: Majlis Bandaraya Iskandar Puteri
  - Mayor: Dato' Mohd Hafiz Hj Ahmad
  - ADUN: YB Pandak Hj Ahmad
  - Councillor: Halim Hj Md Sohod
  - Ketua Kampung: Hj Adnan bin Ladimin
- Time zone: UTC+8 (MST)
- Postcode: 81300
- Dialling code: +607
- Police: Kangkar Pulai Police Station
- Fire: Iskandar Puteri Fire Station
- Website: Taman Pulai Mutiara

Taman Pulai Mutiara is a township in the Mukim Pulai, city of Iskandar Puteri, district of Johor Bahru, State of Johor Darul Ta'zim, Malaysia. The township is bordered by Pulai Indah and Laman Indah to the north, and Alam Jaya Business Park, Setia Business Park and Tropicana Upland to the south. The rest area on it perimeter is covered in green. This township is being developed since 2016, and ready for occupation from 2018 onward.

== Development Phasing ==
The township is developed in two development.
1. Taman Pulai Mutiara
2. Taman Pulai Mutiara 2

== Taman Pulai Mutiara ==
Taman Pulai Mutiara is the first development in the township, consisted of 8 precincts

=== Aster ===
Precinct 1 Aster opened in 2018 is made of 626 double storey link houses with perimeter fencing. This precinct cover 17 hactres area at the south west of the township.

=== Acacia ===
Precinct 2 Acacia is made of 585 unit of 2 and half storey terrace houses.

=== Jasmine ===
Precinct 5 Jasmine consisted of double storey terrace houses.

=== Camellia ===
Precinct 6 Camellia consisted of double storey terrace houses.

=== Lavender ===
Precinct 7 Lavender consisted of double storey cluster houses.

=== Apartments ===
Precinct 3 Apartment Type C
Precinct 8 Apartment Type B
Precinct 9 Apartment Type C

=== Commercial ===
Pulai Boulevard
Shopping Complex in planning

== Taman Pulai Mutiara 2 ==

Taman Pulai Mutiara 2 was developed in a joint venture agreement between Scientex and Amber Land. This development consist 3 precinct at the moment, that are under construction.

== Taman Pulai Mutiara 3 ==
Taman Pulai Mutiara 3 is another proposed development by developer Scientex on land acquired from Keck Seng Plantation. The development is still in planning stage and would make Taman Pulai Mutiara as the largest township in Pulai.

== Institutional ==
School in planning
Surau Al-Aqsa in Precinct 1 Aster Taman Pulai Mutiara
Masjid Taman Pulai Mutiara in planning

== Community ==
=== Penghulu ===
List of Penghulu of Mukim Pulai
1. Tok Zainuddin

=== Councillor ===
List of Councillor of Zone 8 Iskandar Puteri:
1. Wan Nasrudin May 2018 - February 2020
2. Hafizee Adha Norzamri April 2020 - April 2021
3. Halim Hj Md Sohod April 2021 - August 2022
4. Akmal Melan August 2022 - now

=== Ketua Kampung ===
List of Chairman of MPKK Kangkar Pulai:
1. Hafizal Yusoff until February 2020
2. Hj Adnan bin Ladimin

=== Residents Association ===
Persatuan Penduduk Aster Taman Pulai Mutiara
Persatuan Penduduk Acacia Taman Pulai Mutiara
Persatuan Penduduk Jasmine Taman Pulai Mutiara

=== Kawasan Rukun Tetangga ===
KRT Aster 1 Taman Pulai Mutiara
KRT Aster 2 Taman Pulai Mutiara

=== Religious Society ===
Persatuan Kebajikan Penduduk Islam Taman Pulai Mutiara

== See also ==
- Iskandar Puteri
- Pulai Indah, Johor
- Pulai Hijauan, Johor
- Bandar Baru Kangkar Pulai
- Kangkar Pulai
