= Japan earth =

Japan earth may refer to:

- Catechu
- Gambier (extract)
