= C21H40O4 =

The molecular formula C_{21}H_{40}O_{4} (molar mass: 356.547 g/mol) may refer to:

- 2-Oleoylglycerol
- Japanic acid
