= Pulai Hijauan, Johor =

Pulai Hijauan
- Township
- Flag Seal
- Nickname: Taman Pulai Hijauan
- Pulai Hijauan shown within Johor
- Coordinates: 1°32′00″N 103°40′00″E
- Country: Malaysia
- State: Johor
- District: Johor Bahru
- City: Iskandar Puteri
- Mukim: Pulai
- Opening: 2018

Government
  - Local Authority: Majlis Bandaraya Iskandar Puteri
  - ADUN: YB Sr Dzulkefly Ahmad
  - Mayor: Dato' Mohd Adib bin Zahari
  - Penghulu: Zainuddin
- Time zone: UTC+8 (MST)
- Postcode: 81300
- Dialling code: +607
- Police: Kangkar Pulai Police Station
- Fire: Iskandar Puteri Fire Station

Pulai Hijauan is a township in the Mukim Pulai, city of Iskandar Puteri, district of Johor Bahru, State of Johor Darul Ta'zim, Malaysia. The township is bordered by Bandar Baru Kangkar Pulai to the east, and Pulai Indah to the south. The rest of the area on its perimeter is covered in green. This township is being developed by Huayang Berhad since 2015, and ready for occupation from 2017 onward.

== See also ==
- Pulai Mutiara, Johor
- Pulai Indah, Johor
- Kangkar Pulai
- Iskandar Puteri
