= Port of Tanjung Pelepas =

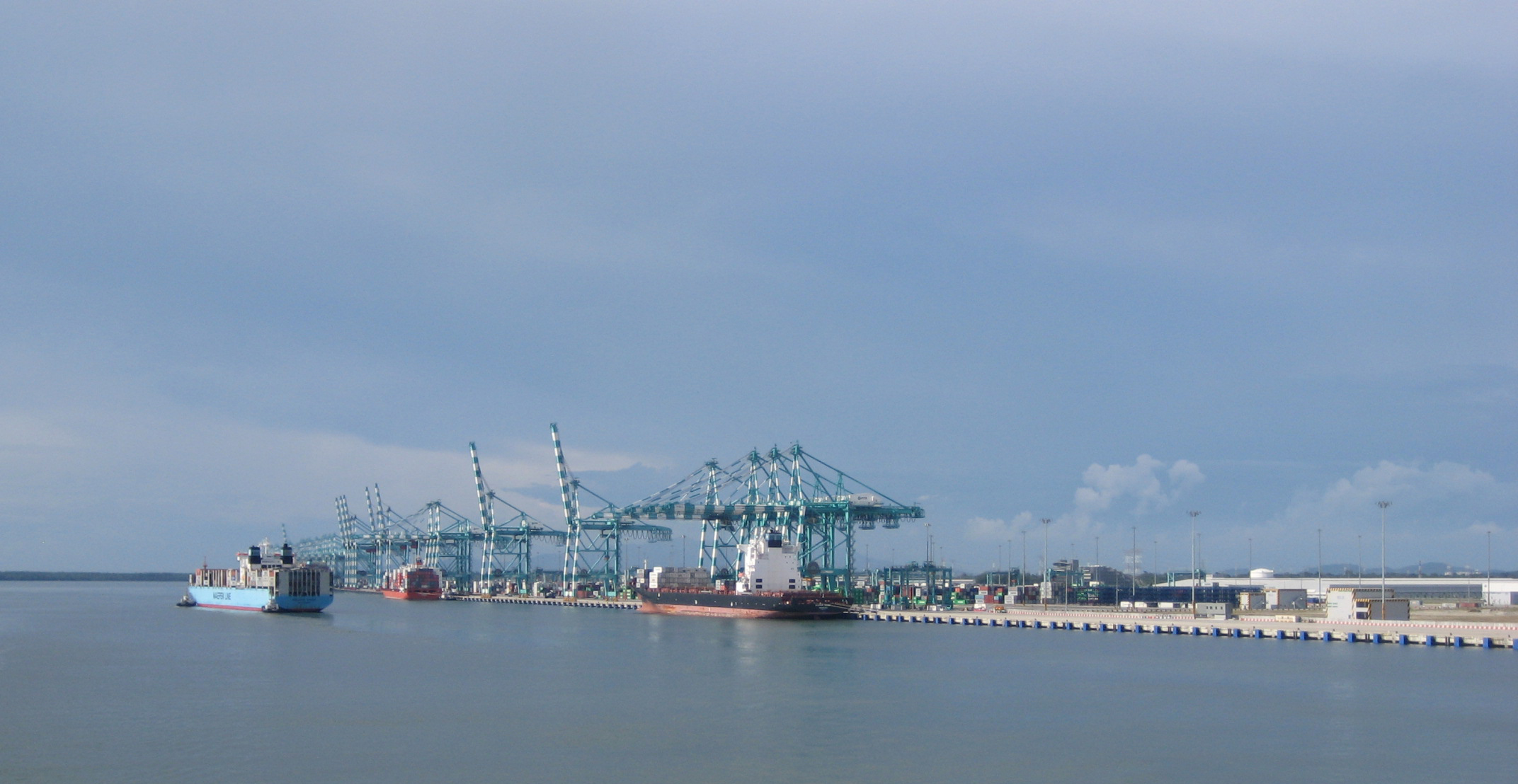
- Interactive map of Port of Tanjung Pelepas
- Native name: Pelabuhan Tanjung Pelepas (Malay)

Location
- Location: Gelang Patah, Johor Bahru District, Johor, Malaysia

Details
- Opened: 13 March 2000
- Type of Harbor: Container port

The Port of Tanjung Pelepas (PTP, Malay: Pelabuhan Tanjung Pelepas, UN/Locode: MYTPP) is a seaport located in Iskandar Puteri, Johor Bahru District, Johor, Malaysia. The port is currently the 11th busiest container port in the world, as well as the fifth most efficient port in the world.

Located 30 km (19 mi) away from Malaysia's second largest city, Johor Bahru, PTP is situated on the eastern bank of the Pulai River estuary in soutwestern Gelang Patah, in close proximity to the Strait of Johor, which separates the countries of Malaysia and Singapore and the Strait of Malacca. Transshipment accounts for over 90 percent of the port's traffic. The port was constructed in an attempt to compete with Singaporean ports, and is part of the APM Terminals Global Terminal Network, which holds a minority share in the joint venture.

== History ==
On 13 March 2000, the harbour held its inauguration ceremony, which was officiated by Prime Minister Mahathir Mohamad.

Year	TEU (million)
2001	2.0
2002	2.6
2003	3.5
2004	4.0
2005	4.2
2006	4.7
2007	5.5
2008	5.58
2009	6
2010	6.5
2011	7.5
2012	7.7
2020	9.8
2021	11.2

In June 2020, 110 containers of toxic electric arc furnace dust, amounting to some 1,864 tonnes, were found at the port. The Malaysian government said it would work to repatriate the waste.

== Facilities ==
The current port offers 14 berths totalling 5.1 km (3.2 mi) of linear wharf length, and a 120 ha (300 acres) container yard which contains around 240,000 TEU in storage space, 48,374 ground slot and 5,080 reefer points.

Container cranes at Port of Tanjung Pelepas

The berths are serviced by 66 Super Post-Panamax quay cranes, 24 EEE cranes with 24 rows outreach, 11 of which have a 22 rows outreach and dual hoist 12 m (40 ft) pick, 30 with 22 rows outreach and twin 6.1 m (20 ft) lift. The total capacity of the port today is over 12.5 million TEU per year with 174 rubber tyred gantry cranes and 498 prime movers operates around the container facility.

In addition to road connectivity, the port is also connected to the peninsula's freight railway system that extends from Johor to the south to southern Thailand to the north, via a 4-track rail terminal. The port development area covers 810 ha (2,000 acres) for the port terminal and 610 ha (1,500 acres) for the free trade zone. The port has a harbour with a draft of 15–19 m (49–62 ft), and a turning basin of 720 m (2,360 ft).. The 2007 master plan of the port envisages over 95 berths with 150 million TEU terminal handling capacity. The berths are expected to extend from the mouth of the Pulai River to Malaysia–Singapore Second Link.

== See also ==
- Iskandar Puteri
- List of Asian ports
