= Kangkar Pulai =

Town in Kulai District, Malaysia

- Towns and Suburbs

Other transcription(s)
  - Jawi: كڠكار ڤولاي
  - Chinese: 江加蒲來新村; Jiāngjiā Púlái Xīncūn
  - Tamil: கங்கார் பூலாய் Kaṅkār pūlāy (Transliteration)
- Kangkar Pulai shown within Johor Bahru. Kangkar Pulai (Peninsular Malaysia) Kangkar Pulai (Malaysia)
- Coordinates: 1°33′28.260″N 103°35′10.770″E
- Country: Malaysia
- State: Johor
- District: Johor Bahru
- City: Iskandar Puteri
- Mukim: Pulai
- Opening: 1917

Government
  - Local Authority: Majlis Bandaraya Iskandar Puteri / Majlis Perbandaran Kulai
  - ADUN: YB Sr Dzulkefly Ahmad
  - Mayor: Dato' Salehuddin bin Hassan
  - Penghulu: Zainuddin
  - Ketua Kampung: Adnan Ladimin
- Time zone: UTC+8 (MST)
- Postcode: 81110 Kangkar Pulai
- Dialling code: +607 (Johor)
- Police: Kangkar Pulai Police Station
- Fire: Iskandar Puteri Fire Station

Kangkar Pulai is a Town of Iskandar Puteri, Johor Bahru District, Johor, Malaysia. The township is bordered by Bandar Baru Kangkar Pulai to the north and west, and Taman Sri Pulai Perdana 2 to the north. The rest area on it perimeter are Palm Estates owned by Keck Seng Group.

== History ==
=== Establishment ===
The first settlement in Kangkar Pulai was the Kangkar Pulai Old Town, a chinese village that was built under the Kangchu system that was introduced during the reign of Sultan Ibrahim.

=== Kangkar Pulai Municipal Council ===
Kangkar Pulai Municipal Council was established on 15 March 1953 with its first office at Jalan Kangkar Pulai. The office were moved to Chinese Business Assembly building two years later. After the independence of Malaya, the municipal council office was moved to the Kangkar Pulai Community Hall built by the government in 1959. On 1 March 1971, Kangkar Pulai Municipal Council and 7 other local authorities in Johor Bahru we amalgamated into Johor Bahru Tengah District Council, later known as Iskandar Puteri City Council in 2018.

== Settlements ==
=== Kangkar Pulai Old Town ===
Kangkar Pulai Old Town was a Chinese village and the first settlement in Kangkar Pulai. The town was named after this village. Many villagers are descendants of early Hakka settlers during Kangchu system introduced in Johor in early 20th century. There are also Indian settlers from descendants of Tamil workers at the nearby Palm Estates. During the First Communist Insurgency, the village is divided into 5 zones under the British resettlement program. Kangkar Pulai police station and rural clinic are located at this village.

The main article for this topic is Kangkar Pulai Old Town

=== Kampung Melayu Kangkar Pulai ===
This Malay village is opened in early 1950s by Malay settlers and located at the hilly area at the west of the old town. The major mosque in Kangkar Pulai, Masjid Nur Syuhadah is located at this village.

=== Taman Desa Permai ===
Taman Desa Permai is the first planned development in Kangkar Pulai. The development is located across the river south from old town and Malay Village. There are around 300 terrace houses and flat houses in this development.

=== Taman Bestari ===
Taman Bestari is the second development located south across the road between Site B and flat houses of Taman Desa Permai.

== Geography ==
Kangkar Pulai is situated at the valley of Pulai River. The earth is hilly with fertile peat soil thus making it suitable for plantation. Gambier and black pepper used to be main agricultural product until they were being replaced by Palm estates due to high demand of palm oil in 1970.

== See also ==
- Iskandar Puteri
- Pulai Mutiara, Johor
- Pulai Indah, Johor
- Pulai Hijauan, Johor
- Bandar Baru Kangkar Pulai
- Pekan Lama Kangkar Pulai
- List of Kangchu system placename etymologies
