= Cachou =

Cachou may refer to:

- Throat lozenge, a breath freshener
- Dragée, small candies that can be used for decoration
- Catechu, a medicinal aromatic drug; the same as gambier, also called Terra Japonica
