= Pulai Indah, Johor =

Pulai Indah تامن ڤولايي إينده
- Township
- Flag Seal

- Pulai Indah shown within Johor
- Coordinates: 1°32′00″N 103°40′00″E
- Country: Malaysia
- State: Johor
- District: Johor Bahru
- City: Iskandar Puteri
- Mukim: Pulai
- Opening: 2018

Government
  - Local Authority: Majlis Bandaraya Iskandar Puteri
  - ADUN: YB Sr Dzulkefly Ahmad
  - Mayor: Dato' Mohd Adib bin Zahari
  - Penghulu: Zainuddin
- Time zone: UTC+8 (MST)
- Postcode: 81300 Johor Bahru
- Dialling code: +607 Johor
- Police: Kangkar Pulai Police Station
- Fire: Iskandar Puteri Fire Station

Pulai Indah is a township in the north of Mukim Pulai, city of Iskandar Puteri, district of Johor Bahru, State of Johor Darul Ta'zim, Malaysia. The township is bordered by Pulai Hijauan and Bandar Baru Kangkar Pulai to the north, and Pulai Mutiara to the south. The rest area on it perimeter is covered in green. This township is being developed by Huayang Berhad since 2008, and ready for occupation from 2010 onward.

== Education ==
=== Sekolah Agama Taman Pulai Indah ===
This religious school is located near Surau Nurussalam and is the only school in Taman Pulai Indah. The school teaches Islamic teaching to the Muslim children in Taman Pulai Indah. On 16 May 2024, it was reported that the issue of overloaded students at the school has been overcame by the procurement of two cabins equipped with teaching equipment.

== Religion ==
=== Mosque ===
==== Masjid Taman Pulai Indah ====
Masjid Taman Pulai Indah is the largest most in north Pulai. The mosque is funded through donation from the public and open for worshipper in 2018. The opening ceremony was officiated by His Majesty Sultan Ibrahim Ismail the ruler of Johor and her sovereign. The mosque is always full with congregation and is one of the busiest mosque in Johor.

==== Surau Nurussalam ====
Surau Nurussalam at Jalan Ariza is the first mosque in Taman Pulai Indah. The mosque also held Friday prayer prior to the opening of Masjid Taman Pulai Indah.

==== Surau As-Sakinah ====
Surau As-Sakinah is located at Jalan Bayan.

=== Temple ===
There is one Chinese temple located at Jalan Gapis for Chinese population.

== Community ==
=== Capital of Northern Pulai ===
Pulai Indah is dubbed as the capital of northern Pulai. In 2020, at least two chieftain in Kulai and Johor Bahru, and six councillors of Iskandar Puteri City Council and Kulai Municipal Council comes from Pulai Indah.

== See also ==
Iskandar Puteri
Pulai Mutiara, Johor
Pulai Hijauan, Johor
Bandar Baru Kangkar Pulai
Kangkar Pulai
