= Mount Gambier (disambiguation) =

Mount Gambier, South Australia is a regional city in Australia.

Mount Gambier may also refer to:

- Mount Gambier (volcano), a dormant maar volcano adjoining the city
- City of Mount Gambier local government area
- Mount Gambier wine region
- Mount Gambier Airport
- Mount Gambier Gaol (closed in 1995)
- Mount Gambier Prison (opened in 1995 at a different site)
- Electoral district of Mount Gambier for the South Australian House of Assembly

== See also ==
- Gambier (disambiguation)
