= Perling =

- Neighbourhood in Iskandar Puteri
- Taman Perling

Other transcription(s)
  - Jawi: ڤرليڠ
  - Chinese: 柏伶
  - Tamil: பெர்லிங்
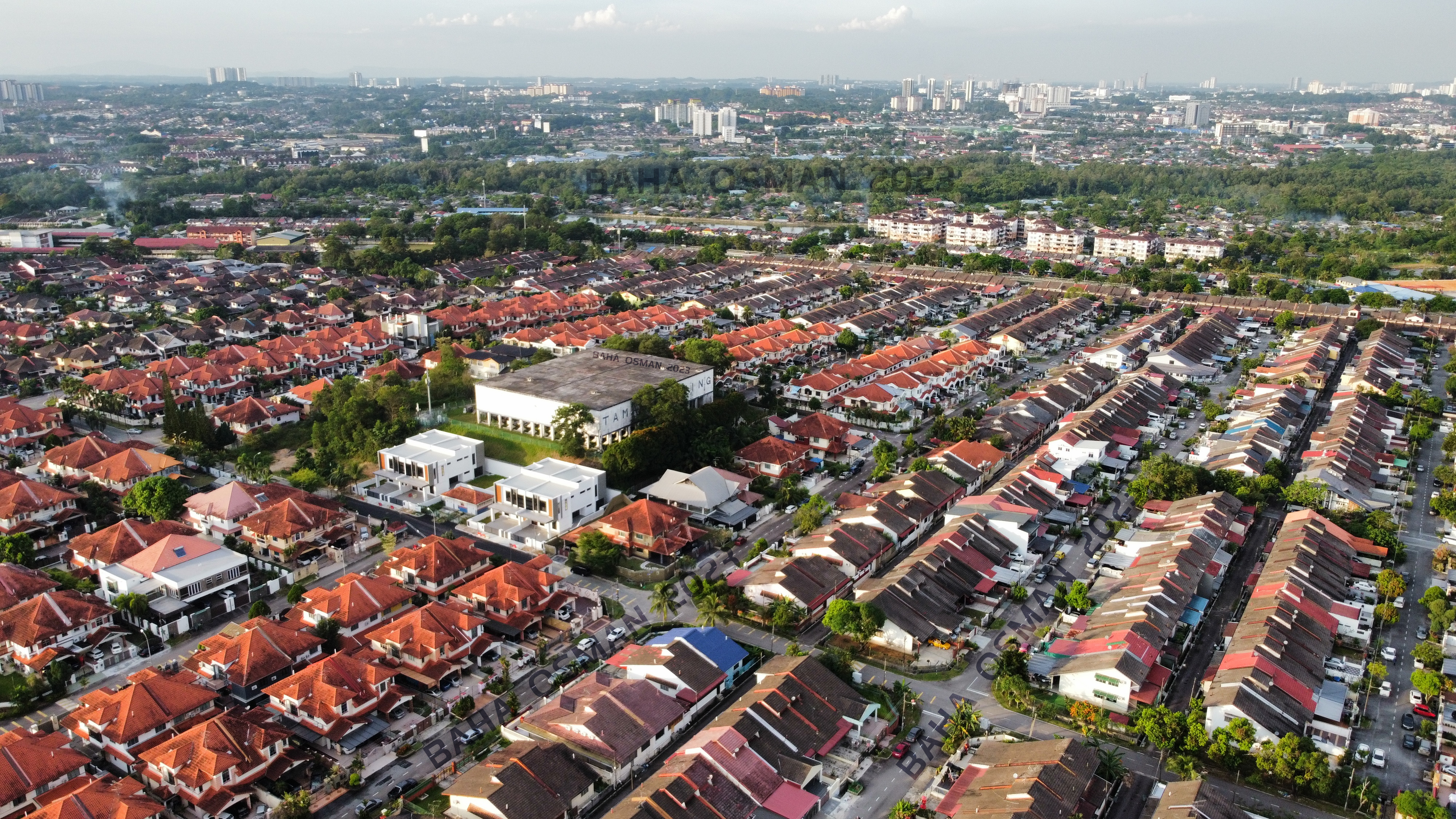
- Taman Perling is seen at the background.

- Perling in Johor, Malay Peninsular and Malaysia Perling (Peninsular Malaysia) Perling (Malaysia)
- Coordinates: 1°29′15.8″N 103°40′59.5″E
- Country: Malaysia
- State: Johor
- District: Johor Bahru

Area
  - Total: 3.73 km^{2} (1.44 sq mi)
- Time zone: UTC+8 (MYT)
- Postal code: 81200

Perling (Jawi: ڤرليڠ; Chinese: 柏伶; Tamil: பெர்லிங்; officially called Taman Perling) is a neighbourhood and an upcoming state constituency in Pulai, Iskandar Puteri, Johor Bahru District, Johor, Malaysia. A development project of the company Pelangi Berhad in 1981, it covers 922 acres (3.73 km^{2}) and contains close to 10,000 housing units. The main landmark of the housing area is Perling Mall, which has 2 floors of almost 100 shops. It is located twenty minutes from Johor Bahru. The iconic building at Taman Perling is Pangsapuri MIDAS with its black and white colours at the peak hill of Taman Perling.

== Education ==
- Sekolah Kebangsaan Taman Perling
- Sekolah Kebangsaan Seri Perling (2)
- Sekolah Kebangsaan Taman Perling (3)
- Sekolah Menengah Kebangsaan Seri Perling
- Sekolah Menengah Kebangsaan Dato' Usman Awang
- Sekolah Rendah Jenis Kebangsaan(Cina)Pei Hwa
- Sekolah Menengah Kebangsaan Bandar Uda Utama

== Demographics ==
Ethnic composition of Perling (2020)
Ethnicities / Nationality	Percentage
Malay	39.3%
Chinese	47.5%
Indians	12.7%
Others	0.5%

Most of Perling's residents are of Chinese descent (47.5%), followed by Malays (39.3%) and Indians (12.7%).

== Transportation ==
The suburb is accessible by Causeway Link route CW3 from Jurong East to Abu Bakar CIQ Complex.
