= Japanic acid =

Names
- IUPAC name japonic acid, heneicosanedioic acid

Identifiers
CAS Number	505-55-5
3D model (JSmol)	Interactive image
ChEBI	CHEBI:165385
ChemSpider	7822618
PubChem CID	9543668
UNII	73CA8QKN34
- InChI: InChI=1S/C21H40O4/c22-20(23)18-16-14-12-10-8-6-4-2-1-3-5-7-9-11-13-15-17-19-21(24)25/h1-19H2,(H,22,23)(H,24,25) Key: PWLXTFFHCFWCGG-UHFFFAOYSA-N
- SMILES: C(CCCCCCCCCC(=O)O)CCCCCCCCCC(=O)O

Properties
Chemical formula	C_{21}H_{40}O_{4}
Molar mass	356.547 g·mol^{−1}
Appearance	brown solid
Melting point	117.5 to 117.9 °C (243.5 to 244.2 °F; 390.6 to 391.0 K)
Solubility in water	poorly soluble
- Except where otherwise noted, data are given for materials in their standard state (at 25 °C [77 °F], 100 kPa). Infobox references

Japanic acid or heneicosanedioic acid is a chemical compound with the chemical formula НО_{2}С(СН_{2})_{19}СО_{2}Н.

The compound is a long-chain dicarboxylic acid, one of the longest naturally occurring dicarboxylic acids. Initially, it was extracted from natural fat called Japan wax.

== Discovery ==
Japanic acid was first isolated by Eberhardt in 1888 by fractional distillation under vacuum.

Since the natural raw material from which the acid is obtained was the dried juice of some species of acacia trees (catechu), called "Japanese dirt", and the acid was called Japanic.

== Physical properties ==
Like other long-chain dicarboxylic acids, it demonstrates physical properties typical of fatty acids with extended carbon backbones, including high melting points and limited water solubility.

Japanic acid melts at a temperature of 117.5–117.9 °C. When heated to 200 °C, it begins to decompose with the release of CO_{2} and the formation of ketone C_{10}H_{21}COC_{10}H_{21}.

The acid and its salts are colored in various shades of brown. The acid is only slightly soluble in most solvents.

== Uses ==
Japanic acid is used in the synthesis of polyesters.
