= Gloucester Gambier =

English cricketer (1812–1872)

Major-General Gloucester Gambier CB
- Born: 19 October 1812; Shenley, Hertfordshire, England
- Died: 29 March 1872 (aged 59); Gosport, Hampshire, England
- Cricket career

Cricket information
- Batting: Unknown

Domestic team information
- Years: Team
- 1839: Marylebone Cricket Club

Career statistics
Competition	First-class
Matches	3
Runs scored	15
Batting average	2.50
100s/50s	–/–
Top score	5
Catches/stumpings	–/–
- Source: Cricinfo, 17 July 2020

Gloucester Gambier CB (19 October 1812 – 29 March 1872) was a British Army officer and an English first-class cricketer.

== Military career ==
The son of Sir James Gambier, he was born at Shenley, Hertfordshire. He was commissioned into the British Army as a second lieutenant in the Royal Artillery in July 1831, with promotion to first lieutenant following in July 1832. He was promoted to second captain in April 1842. Following promotion to captain in May 1847, two promotions followed in 1854 with promotion to major being granted in June 1854 and promotion to lieutenant colonel the following month.

Gambier accompanied the Royal Artillery in 1854 to partake in the Crimean War, where he commanded a siege train prior to the Siege of Sevastopol. He took part in the Battle of Inkerman in November 1854, where he was severely wounded. His wounds were severe enough to necessitate his evacuation home to recover from his wounds. For his actions during the conflict he was made a Companion to the Order of the Bath in July 1855, as well as being decorated by the Ottoman Empire with the Order of the Medjidie, 5th Class in 1858. Following three years service as a lieutenant colonel, Gambier was automatically promoted to colonel in July 1857 and was nominated to be colonel in charge of the Royal Artillery in the Dublin district, from where he was transferred to command the Royal Artillery at Aldershot Garrison.

Gambier became a major-general in March 1869, following the death of Major-General John Ormsby. Gambier died at the Gosport home of his brother, the Royal Navy admiral Robert Gambier, in March 1872.

== First-class cricket ==
Gambier played first-class cricket, making his debut for the Gentlemen of Kent against the Marylebone Cricket Club (MCC) at Chislehurst in 1838, while the following year he played for the MCC against Cambridge University at Lord's. Gambier later made a third and final first-class appearance for the Gentlemen of Kent against the Gentlemen of England at Lord's in 1844. In his three first-class matches, Gambier scored 15 runs with a high score of 5.
