= Gambhir River =

Gambhir River may refer to:

- Gambhir River, Madhya Pradesh
- Gambhir River, Rajasthan
