= Maurice Gambier d'Hurigny =

French sculptor

- Born: 1912
- Died: 2000 (aged 87–88)
- Education: École nationale supérieure des Beaux-Arts
- Occupation: Sculptor

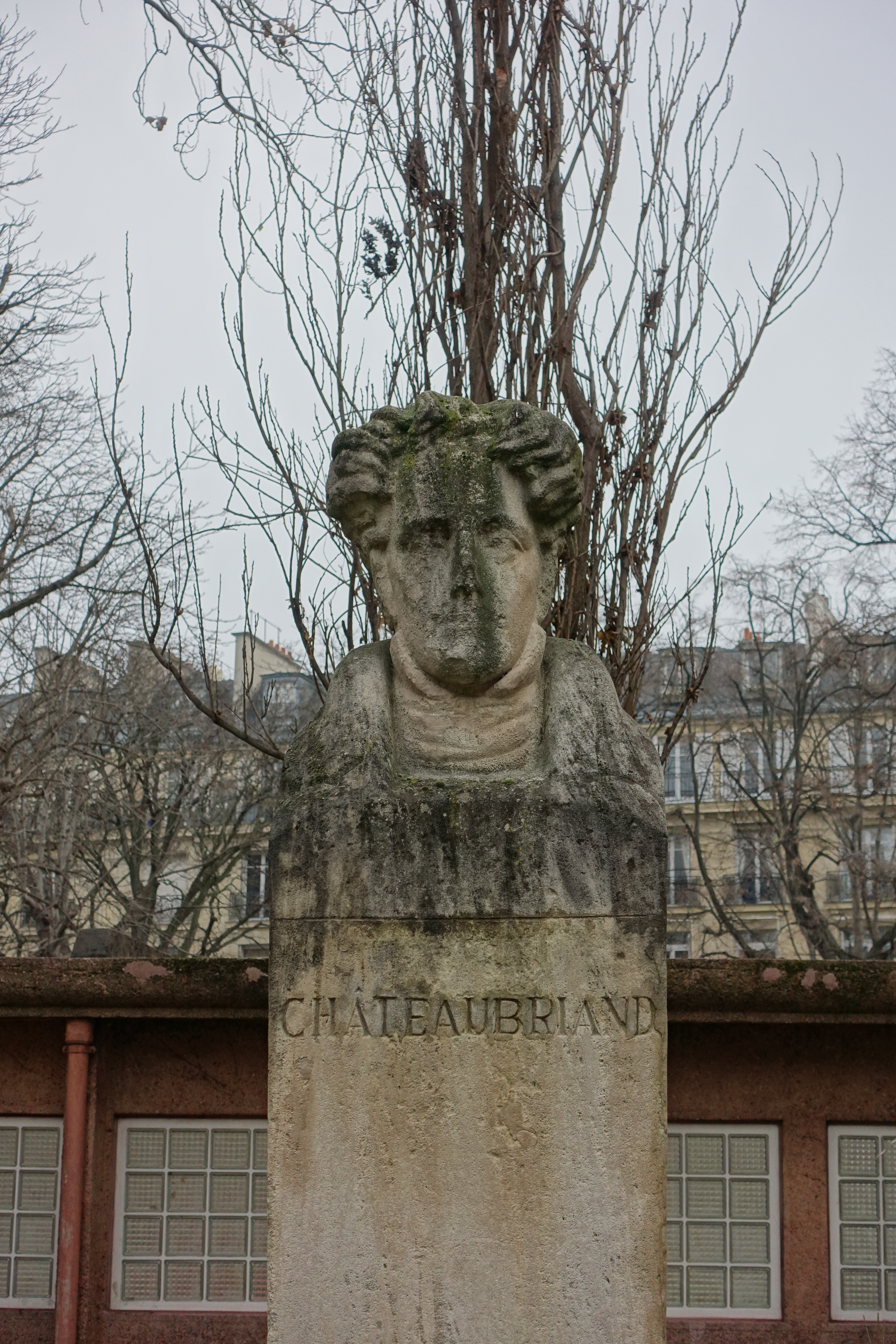
Bust of Chateaubriand, designed by Gambier

Maurice Gambier d'Hurigny (1912–2000) was a French sculptor. He graduated from the École des Beaux-Arts. He won the Prix de Rome in Sculpture for La jeune Eve apparaît à l'aurore première in 1942. He also designed public sculptures, like the bust of François-René de Chateaubriand on the Square des Missions-Étrangères in the 7th arrondissement of Paris.

== Biography ==
Maurice Gambier d'Hurigny, often referred to simply as Maurice Gambier, was born in Paris on February 24, 1912.

After being admitted to the École nationale supérieure des beaux-arts in Paris, he studied under Henri Bouchard.

In 1942, he won the Grand Prix de Rome with a full-relief sculpture titled The Young Eve Appears at the First Light of Dawn.

Since Benito Mussolini had confiscated the Villa Medici between 1939 and 1945, the French Academy in Rome relocated to Nice, to the Villa Paradiso, and it was not until 1946 that Maurice Gambier d'Hurigny spent a year in Rome, at a time when the Villa Medici was directed by Jacques Ibert.

After World War II, the City of Nice decided to retain the six studios set up for the winners of the Prix de Rome, and Gambier d'Hurigny established his studio there.

He was appointed professor at the École Nationale des Arts Décoratifs (ENAD) in Nice (located on Rue Tonduti de l'Escarène).

He died in Nice on October 22, 2000.

An exhibition was held in 2009 at the Maison du Portal in Levens, Alpes-Maritimes in memory of the three artists Luis Molné, Nicolas Akmen, and Maurice Gambier.
