= Malaysia–Singapore Second Link =

Bridge connecting Singapore and Johor, Malaysia

Malaysia–Singapore Second Link Laluan Kedua Malaysia–Singapura 馬新第二通道
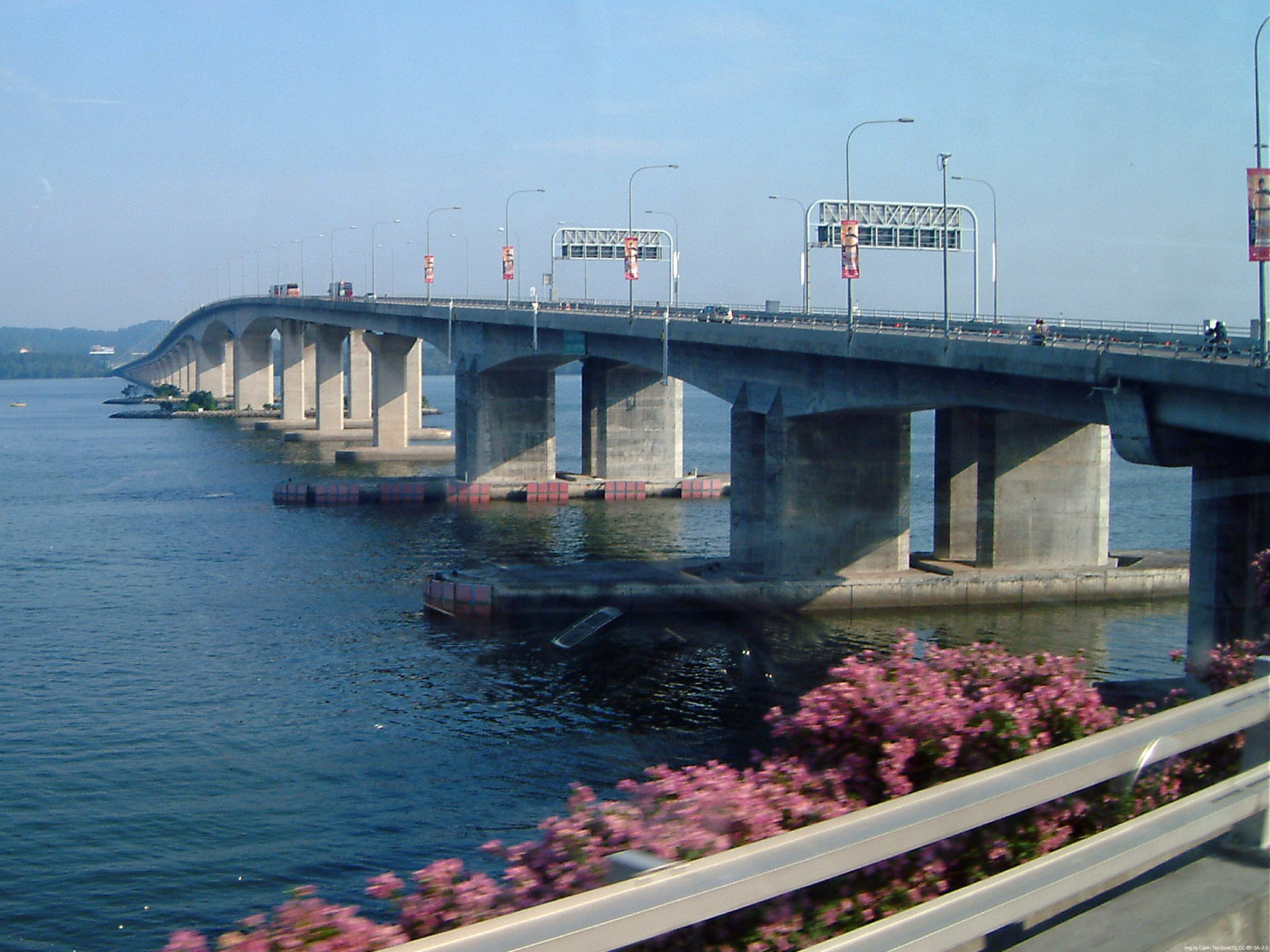
- Coordinates: 1°21′03″N 103°37′59″E
- Carries: Motor vehicles
- Crosses: Straits of Johor
- Locale: Tanjung Kupang, Johor, Malaysia, Kompleks Sultan Abu Bakar and Tuas, Singapore, Tuas Checkpoint
- Official name: Malaysia–Singapore Second Link
- Maintained by: PLUS Expressways (Malaysia); Land Transport Authority (Singapore)

Characteristics
- Design: Box girder bridge
- Total length: 1.92 kilometres (1.19 mi) (bridge); 6 kilometres (3.7 mi) (between checkpoints)
- Width: 25 metres (82 ft)
- Longest span: 150 metres (0.093 mi)

History
- Designer: Government of Malaysia; Malaysian Highway Authority; United Engineers Malaysia Berhad; Government of Singapore; Land Transport Authority
- Constructed by: United Engineers Malaysia Berhad
- Opened: 2 January 1998; 28 years ago
- Inaugurated: 18 April 1998; 28 years ago

Location
- Interactive map of Malaysia–Singapore Second Link

The Malaysia–Singapore Second Link (Malay: Laluan Kedua Malaysia–Singapura, Chinese: 馬新第二通道) is a bridge connecting Singapore and Johor, Malaysia. In Singapore, it is officially known as the Tuas Second Link. The bridge was built to reduce traffic congestion on the Johor–Singapore Causeway and was opened to traffic on 2 January 1998. It was inaugurated jointly by Singapore's Prime Minister Goh Chok Tong and Mahathir Mohamad, Prime Minister of Malaysia.

The bridge supports a dual-three lane carriageway linking Kampong Ladang at Tanjung Kupang, Johor to Jalan Ahmad Ibrahim at Tuas, Singapore. The total length of the bridge over water is 1.92 kilometres (1.19 mi). The distance between checkpoints is approximately 6 kilometres (3.7 mi).

Unlike its shorter counterparts in Woodlands, as Tuas Checkpoint is designated as a vehicular checkpoint only, travellers are not allowed to arrive at the checkpoint by foot.

Travelling along the Second Link usually takes less time than the Causeway due to smoother traffic in both directions; however, during festive periods (especially Chinese New Year, Hari Raya, Christmas and Deepavali) the dense traffic between Malaysia and Singapore still leads to massive jams on both crossings.

== History ==
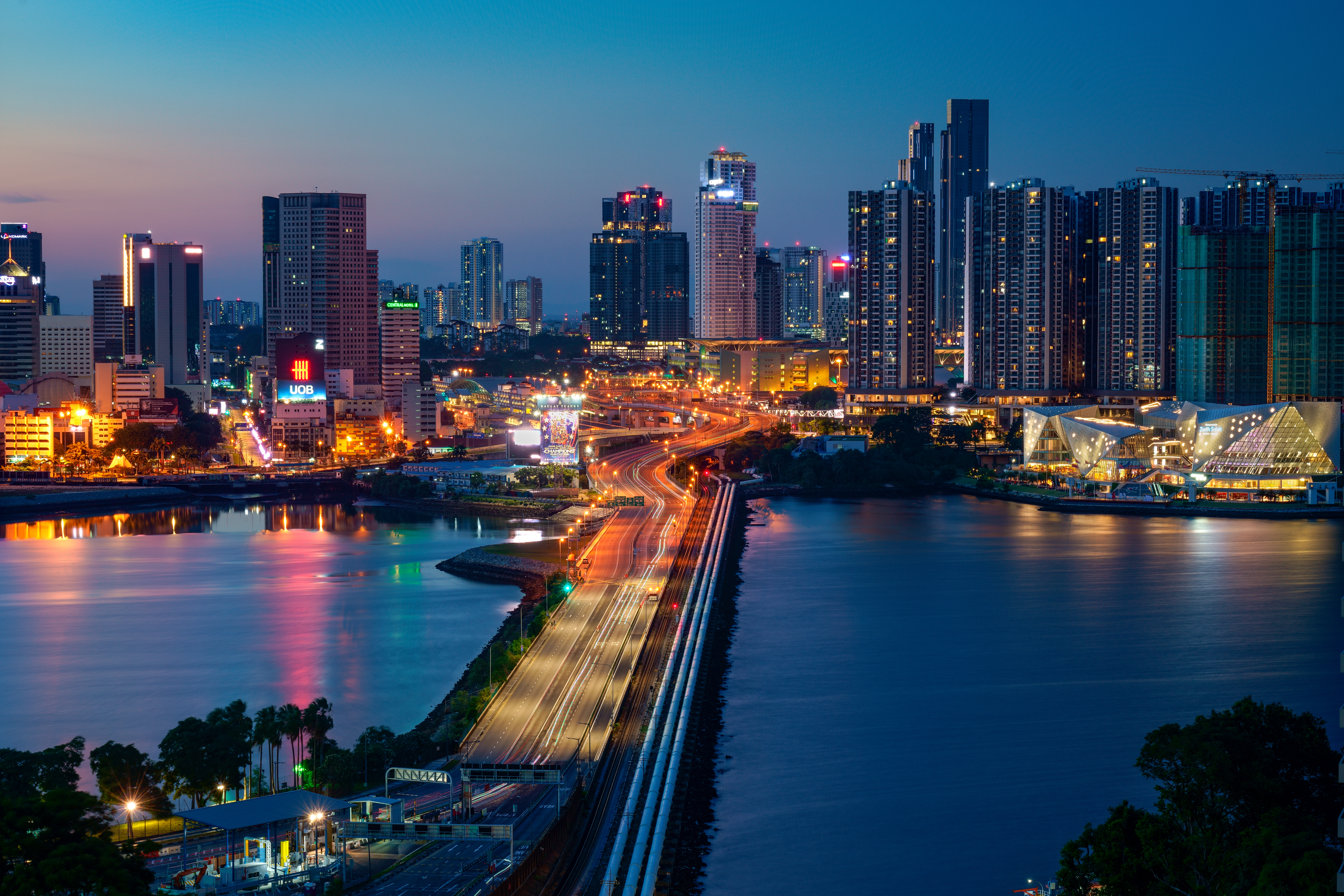
Johor–Singapore Causeway

The idea of building a second link between Malaysia and Singapore was first raised in July 1980 by then-Menteri Besar of Johor, Othman Saat. Gelang Patah was raised as a viable site due to its distant proximity from Johor Bahru, and the suggestion was raised to tackle growing traffic jams on the Johor-Singapore causeway. The Malaysian federal Government welcomed Othman's plan, and the Johor State Government formed a committee to study the feasibility of building the second link.

In July 1989, United Engineers Malaysia Berhad (UEM) submitted a proposal to the government of Malaysia to privatise the construction of a second link to Singapore. The acceptance of the proposal brought about the signing of a concession agreement in July 1993, giving exclusive rights and authority to UEM to design, construct, manage, operate and maintain the bridge and expressways for a period of 30 years commencing 27 July 1993.

Following this, a novation agreement was executed in May 1994, whereby UEM assigned all its rights, liabilities and obligations in respect of the concession agreement to Linkedua (Malaysia) Berhad, a wholly owned subsidiary of UEM.

The construction of the bridge required the co-operation of the government of Malaysia and the government of Singapore. On 22 March 1994, an inter-government agreement was signed defining the responsibilities of both governments with regard to the design, construction, operation, and maintenance of the bridge. Each government was responsible for the construction of the portion the bridge which fell within its borders, based on a common agreed design. A joint committee comprising representatives of each government was formed to oversee the implementation of this Malaysia–Singapore Second Crossing project.

The major components of the project are the Second Crossing bridge, forty-four kilometres of expressways, a Customs, Immigration and Quarantine complex, three toll plazas, two rest and service areas and other ancillary facilities. The bridge was designed to accommodate up to 200,000 vehicles a day.

The Second Link was opened to traffic on 2 January 1998. It was officially opened on 18 April the same year by the Prime Ministers of both countries, namely Dato' Seri Dr. Mahathir Mohamad of Malaysia and Goh Chok Tong of Singapore.

== Design ==
Designed by CPG Corporation, it involved the use of 54,000 cubic metres (1,900,000 ft^{3}) of concrete and 18,000 tonnes (20,000 short tons) of reinforcing steel, and won the Architectural Design Award and Best Buildable Design Award awarded by the Singapore Institute of Architects and the Building and Construction Authority respectively.

== Checkpoints ==
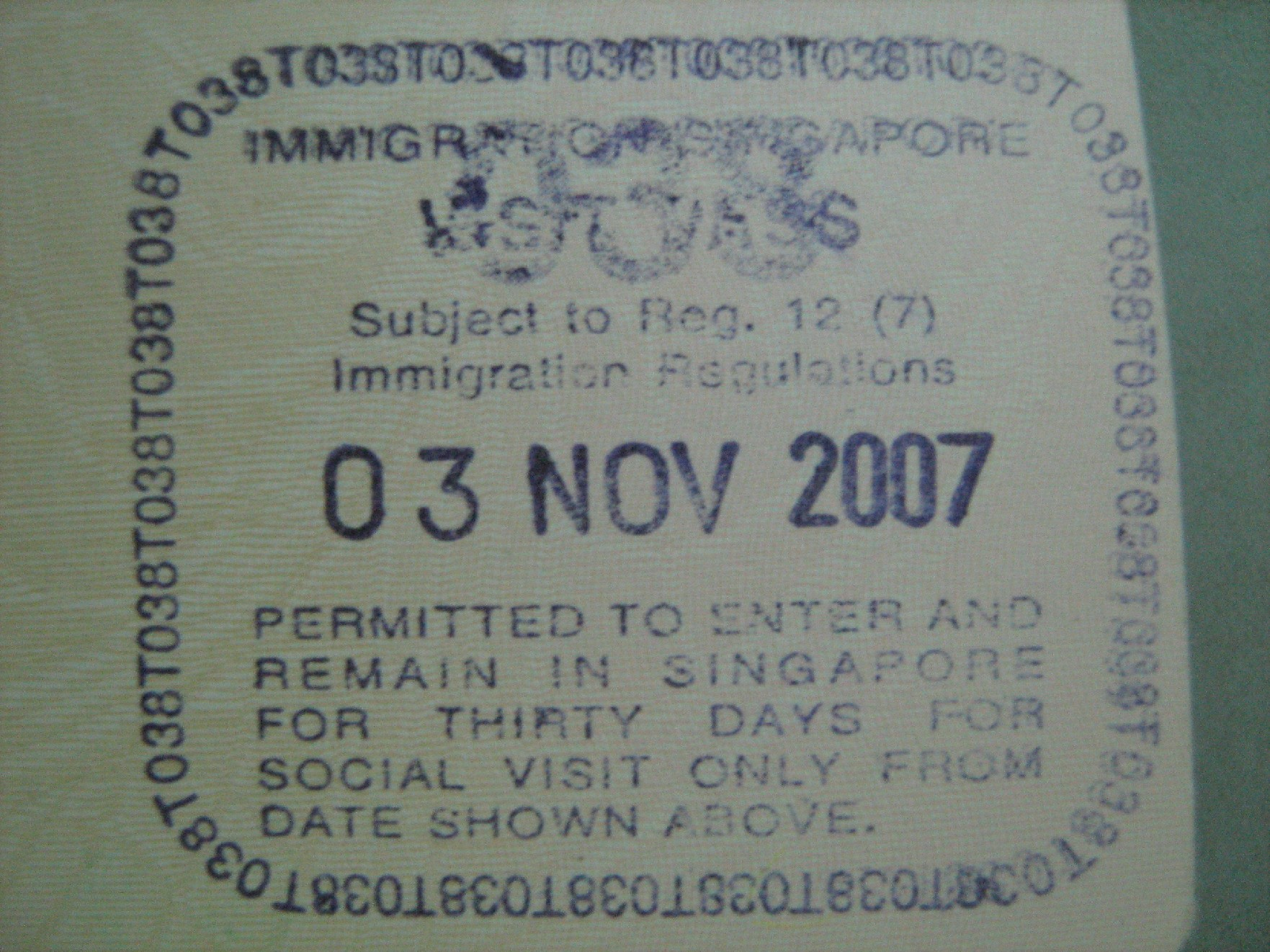
Tuas entry stamp in Malaysian Passport

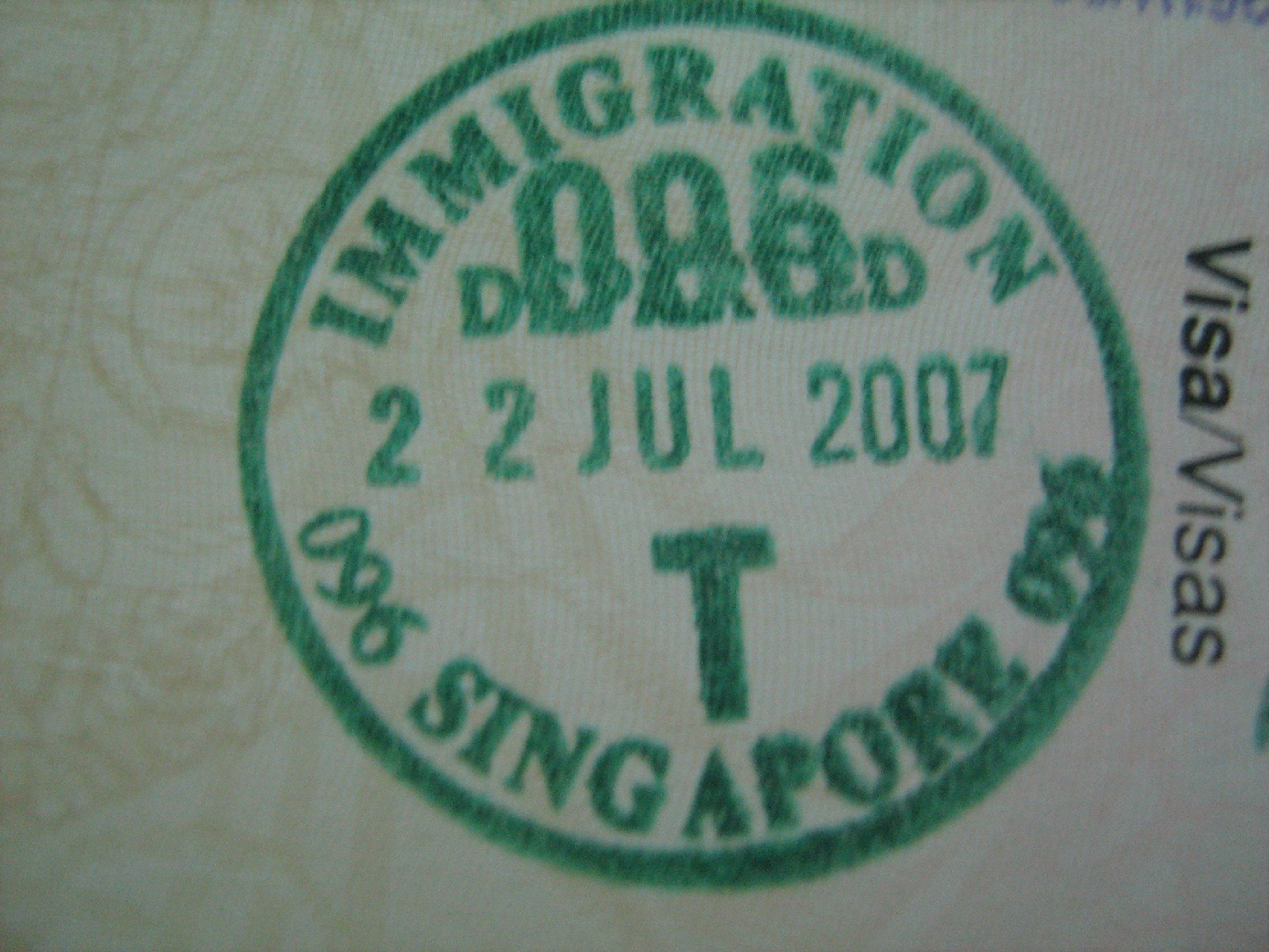
Tuas exit stamp in Malaysian Passport

The checkpoint on the Malaysia side is the Sultan Abu Bakar CIQ Complex (Kompleks Sultan Abu Bakar). The checkpoint on the Singapore side, the Tuas Checkpoint, was built on 19.6 hectares (48 acres) of reclaimed land at a cost of S$485 million.

== Access from other roads ==
=== From Malaysia ===
On the Malaysian side, the bridge is connected to the Second Link Expressway (Malay: Lebuhraya Laluan Kedua Malaysia–Singapura) E3 also known as Linkedua Expressway, which links from Senai North Interchange Exit 253 at North–South Expressway E2, Senai Airport and Taman Perling, Johor Bahru via its extension known as Johor Bahru Parkway E3.

=== From Singapore ===
The bridge is directly accessed via the Ayer Rajah Expressway, along with other supporting roads around the vicinity of the Tuas industrial area.

== Toll charges ==
=== Tanjung Kupang Toll Plaza (Heading into Malaysia) ===
Class	Type of vehicles	Rate (in Malaysian Ringgit (RM))
0	Motorcycles (Vehicles with two axles and two wheels)	RM1.10
1	Private Cars (Vehicles with two axles and three or four wheels (excluding taxi and bus))	RM7.50
2	Vans and other small good vehicles (Vehicles with two axles and six wheels (excluding bus))	RM17.10
3	Large Trucks (Vehicles with three or more axles (excluding bus))	RM34.40
4	Taxis	RM5.70
5	Buses	RM9.10

=== Tuas Checkpoint (heading into Singapore) ===
Class	Type of vehicles	Rate (in Singapore Dollar (S$))
	Motorcycles	Nil
	Passenger Cars	S$2.10
	Vans and other small good vehicles	S$5.60
	Large Trucks	S$11.30
	Taxis	S$1.60
	Buses	S$2.30

=== Payment Modes ===
Country	Payment	Acceptance	Notes
Malaysia	Cash payment	X mark	
Malaysia	Touch 'n Go	check	
Malaysia	SmartTAG	check	
Malaysia	MyRFiD (using Touch n' Go and Credit/Debit Card)	X mark	
Singapore	Autopass Card	check	Non-Singapore registered vehicles only
Singapore	CEPAS CBT EZ-Link and Concession Card	check	
Singapore	SimplyGo EZ-Link and Concession Card	X mark	
Singapore	CEPAS EZ-Link x Touch n' Go Card	check	
Singapore	CEPAS EZ-Link Motoring	check	
Singapore	CEPAS NETS Motoring	check	
Singapore	NETS Contactless CashCard	check	
Singapore	NETS Prepaid	X mark	
Singapore	CEPAS NETS FlashPay	check	
Singapore	Cash payment	X mark	
Singapore	Mastercard	X mark	
Singapore	Visa	X mark	
Singapore	NETS Tap	X mark	
Singapore	NETS CashCard (1st generation)	X mark	Obsolete
Singapore	American Express	X mark	

== 2020 Malaysia movement control order ==
On 16 March 2020, in response to the COVID-19 pandemic in Malaysia, Malaysia Prime Minister Muhyiddin Yassin announced that Malaysia would be implementing a movement control order which would start from 18 March. Due to the movement order, the Causeway faced immense jams due to a surge of Malaysians returning to Malaysia and back to Singapore before the order took effect. All bus services could not enter Johor Bahru for two weeks from 18 March to 31 March 2020. However, the flow of cargo, goods and food supplies carried on as normal.

== Navigational channels ==
When travelling by sea, navigational aids consists of lights mounted on the bridge piers and lighted buoys placed at strategic navigational locations. The three sea channels dimensions are 75 metres (246 ft) wide by 25 metres (82 ft) high; 50 metres (160 ft) wide by 9 metres (30 ft) high; and 75 metres (246 ft) wide by 12 metres (39 ft) high.

== Technical specifications ==
Bridge Specifications

- Overall length of bridge: 1,920 metres (6,300 ft)
- Distance between both checkpoints: 6,000 metres (20,000 ft)
- Length within Malaysian waters: 1,769 metres (5,804 ft)
- Construction period: Oct 1994 to Oct 1997
- Total length of piles: 10,230 metres (33,560 ft)
- Total volume of concrete: 54,000 cubic metres (1,900,000 ft^{3})
- Total weight of reinforcing steel: 18,000 tonnes (20,000 short tons)
- Total number of precast box segments: 840 units
- Longest span: 165 metres (541 ft)

Navigational Channels

- Malaysian main navigational channel: 75 metres (246 ft) wide by 25 metres (82 ft) high.
- Malaysian secondary navigational channel: 50 metres (160 ft) wide by 9 metres (30 ft) high.
- Singaporean navigational channel: 75 metres (246 ft) wide by 12 metres (39 ft) high

== Public transport ==
Second Link cross border services provided by Causweay Link

Causeway Link Routes CW3, CW4, CW6 and CW7 from Jurong East, Boon Lay & Tuas Link in Singapore to Bukit Indah, Gelang Patah, Pontian & Legoland in Malaysia cross the Second Link daily.

Transtar Travel Routes TS6 & TS6A from Buona Vista & Changi Airport via one-north & Tuas Link in Singapore to Legoland, Puteri Harbour & Gelang Patah Sentral in Malaysia cross the Second Link daily. Both routes stop at intermediate points on request.

== Digital immigration initiatives (2024–2025) ==
In mid-2024, the Malaysian government implemented a pilot program for "passport-less" immigration clearance at the Sultan Abu Bakar Complex (KSAB) for Malaysian bus commuters and motorcyclists. The system utilizes a QR code-based application (such as MyTrip or MyRentas) to expedite border crossings. Following the initial pilot, the system was expanded in early 2025 to include car passengers and foreign nationals, as part of a broader effort to integrate travel within the Johor-Singapore Special Economic Zone (JS-SEZ).

== Gallery ==
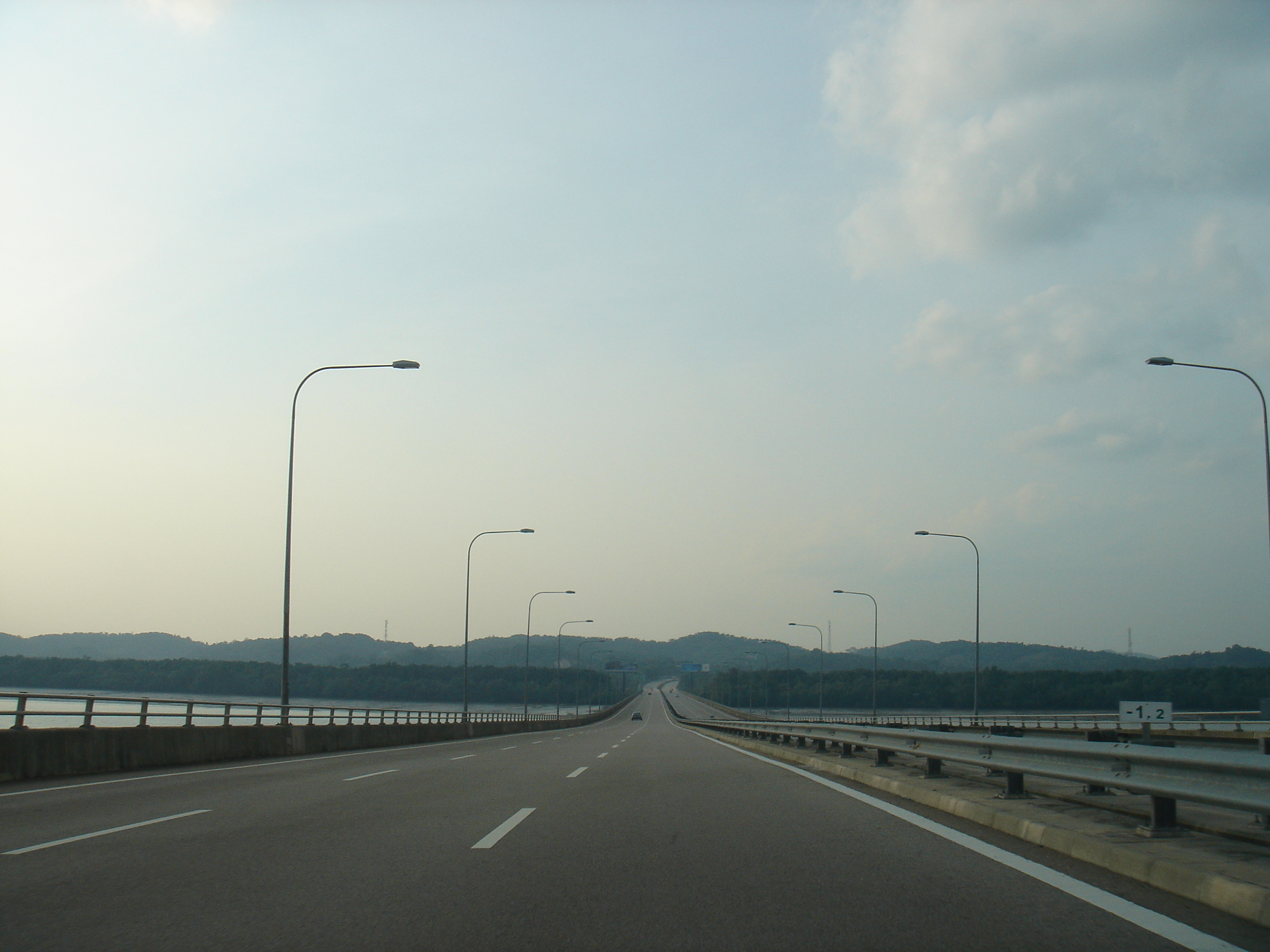
View from the Second Link bridge, facing towards Malaysia.

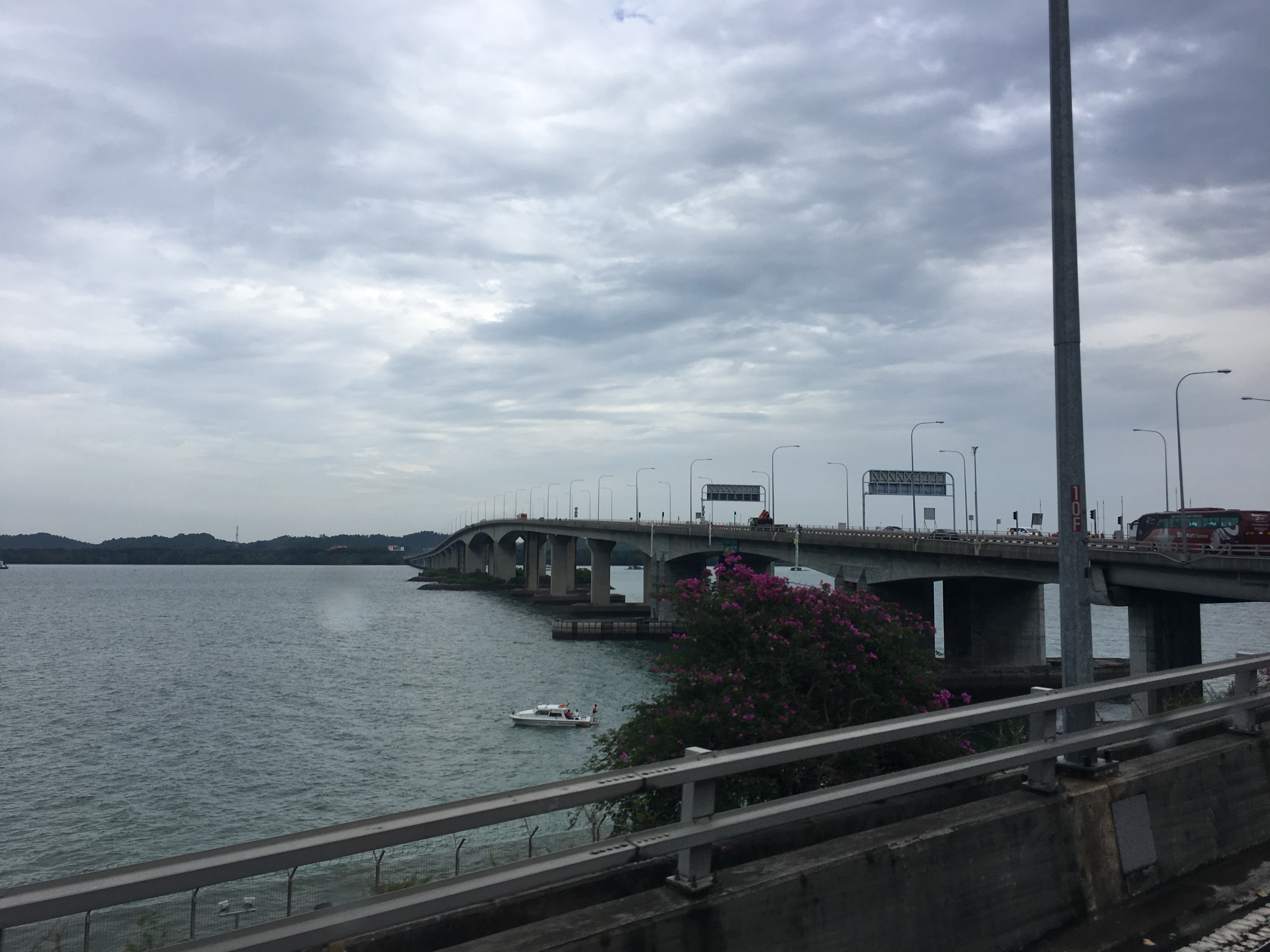
View of the bridge from Singapore

== See also ==
- Johor–Singapore Causeway
- List of international bridges
