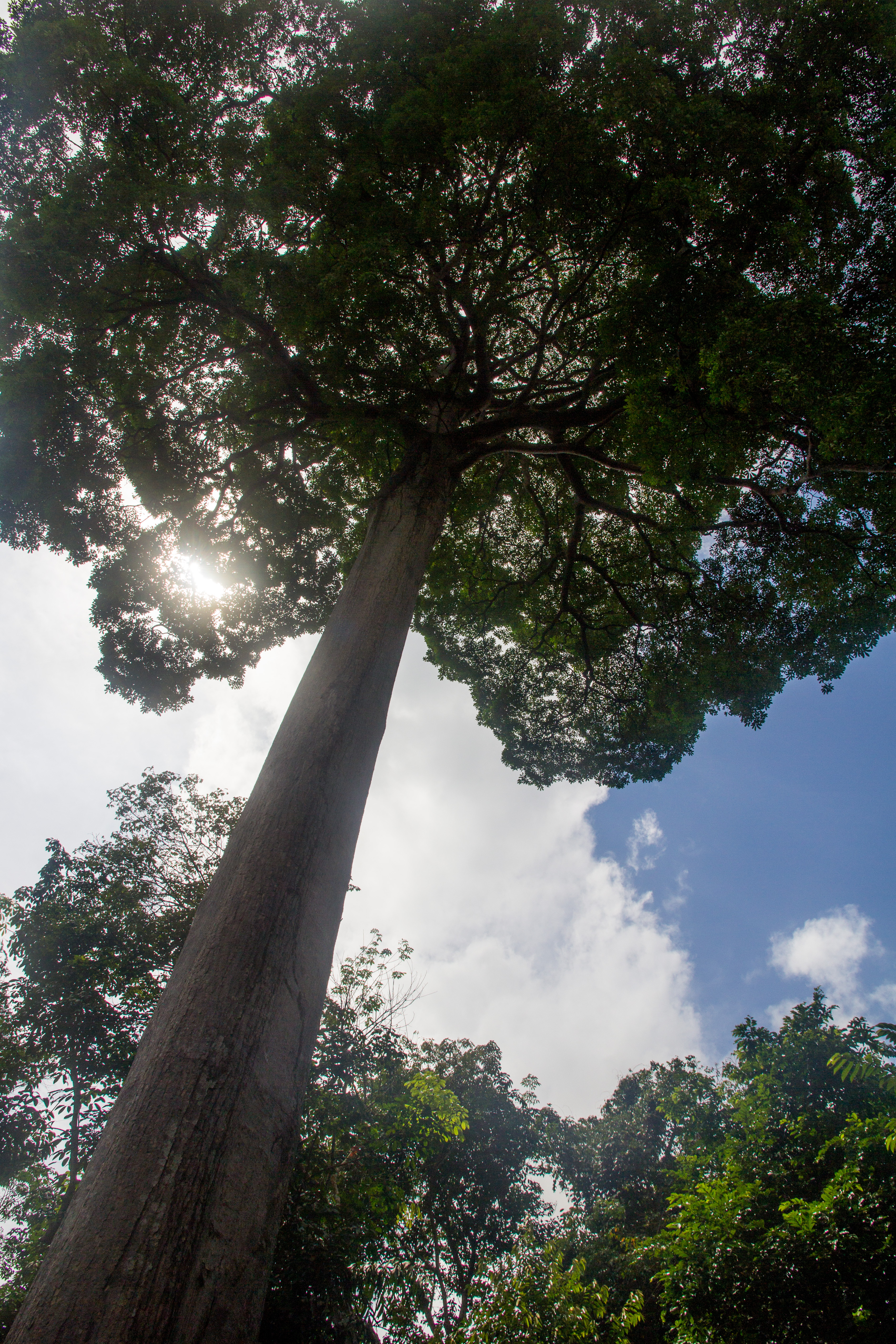
- on Pulau Ubin, Singapore

Scientific classification
- Kingdom: Plantae
- Clade: Tracheophytes
- Clade: Angiosperms
- Clade: Eudicots
- Clade: Asterids
- Order: Gentianales
- Family: Apocynaceae
- Genus: Alstonia
- Species: A. angustiloba

Binomial name
- Alstonia angustiloba Miq.

Synonyms
- Alstonia calophylla Miq.; Paladelpha angustiloba (Miq.) Pichon

= Alstonia angustiloba =

Species of tree

Alstonia angustiloba is a tree in the dogbane family Apocynaceae.

== Description ==
Alstonia angustiloba grows as a large tree up to 40 metres (130 ft) tall, with a trunk diameter of up to 60 centimetres (24 in). The bark is greyish or brownish. Its fragrant flowers feature a white, yellow or cream corolla. The fruit is brownish, up to 35 centimetres (14 in) long.

== Distribution and habitat ==
Alstonia angustiloba is native to Thailand, Peninsular Malaysia, Singapore, Sumatra and Java. It is found in a variety of habitats from sea level to 200 metres (700 ft) altitude.
