= Catechu =

Extract of acacia trees

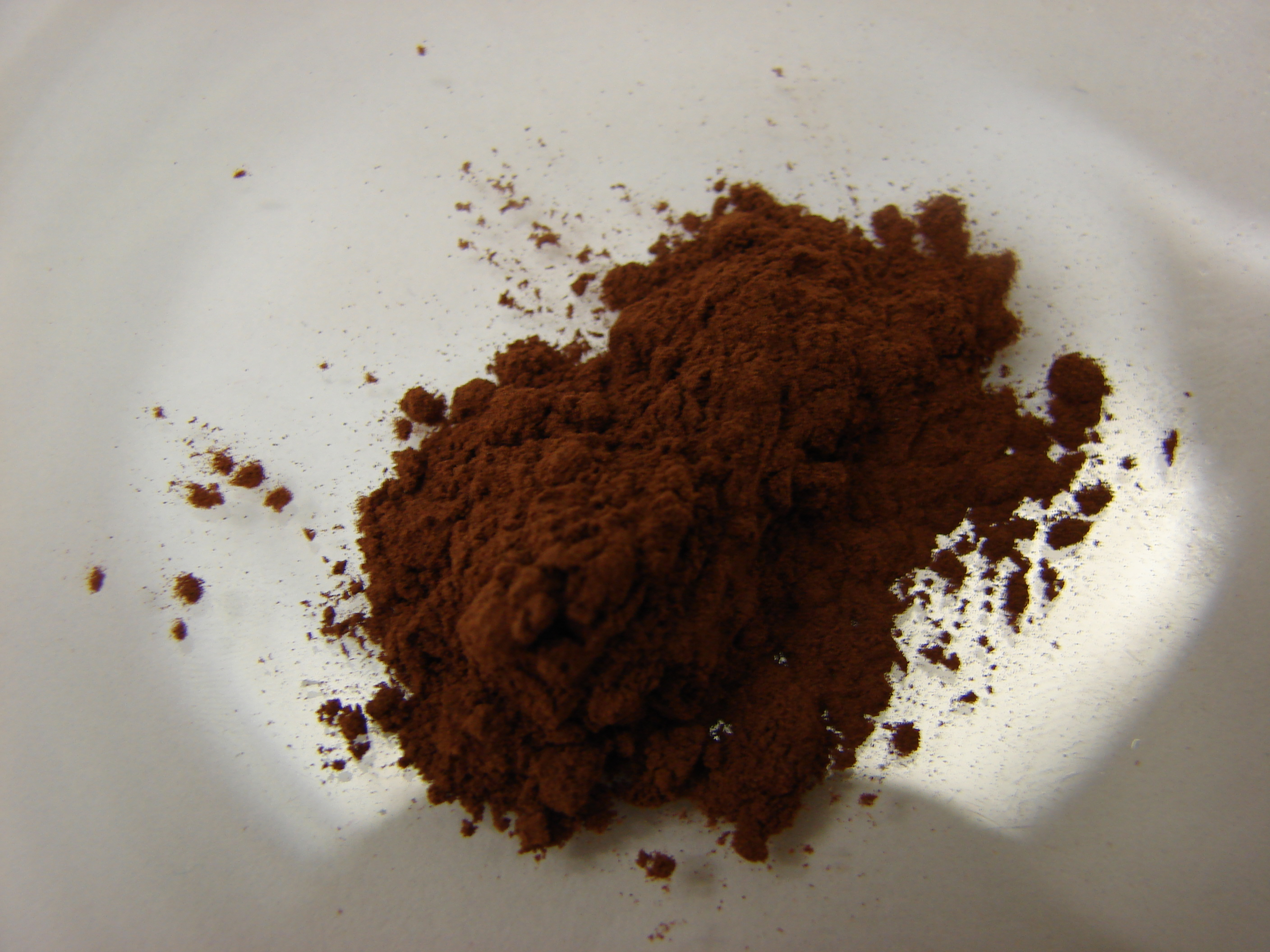
Catechu

Catechu (/ˈkætɪʃuː/ or /ˈkætɪtʃuː/) is a plant extract that, under the name cutch, is used as a brown dye, in tanning, and to preserve fishing nets and sails.

Related extracts include white cutch, or gambier, which is obtained from Uncaria gambir, and palm-catechu, which is extracted from the seeds of Areca catechu.

== Uses ==
As an astringent, it has been used since ancient times in Ayurvedic medicine, as well as in breath-freshening spice mixtures, for example in France and Italy, in some licorice pastilles. It is also an important ingredient in South Asian cooking paan mixtures, such as ready-made paan masala and gutka.

The catechu mixture is high in natural vegetable tannins (which accounts for its astringent effect), and may be used for the tanning of animal hides. Early research by Humphry Davy in the early 19th century first demonstrated the use of catechu in tanning over more expensive and traditional oak extracts.

Under the name cutch, it is a brown dye used for tanning and dyeing and for preserving fishing nets and sails. Cutch will dye wool, silk, and cotton a yellowish-brown. Cutch gives gray-browns with an iron mordant and olive-browns with a copper mordant.

Black catechu has recently also been used by Blavod Drinks Ltd. to dye their vodka black.

White cutch, also known as gambier, gambeer, or gambir, which is extracted from Uncaria gambir has the same uses. Palm-catechu is extracted from the seeds of Areca catechu.

== Derivative chemicals ==
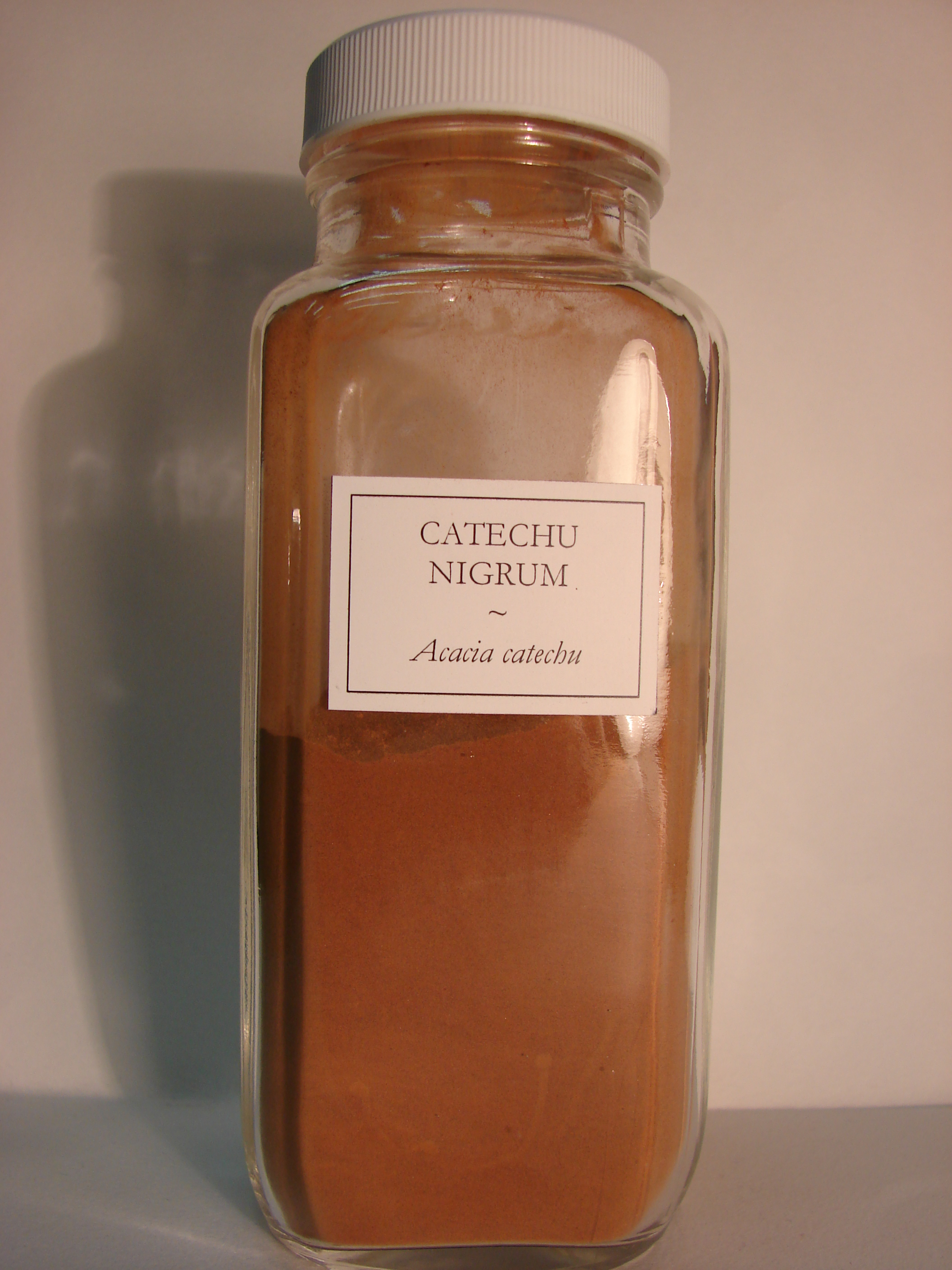
Bottle of catechu

The catechu extract gave its name to the catechin and catechol chemical families first derived from it. Its historic name is "Japanese Earth" or "Japanese Dirt", which is responsible for naming "Japanic acid".

== See also ==
- Arid Forest Research Institute
