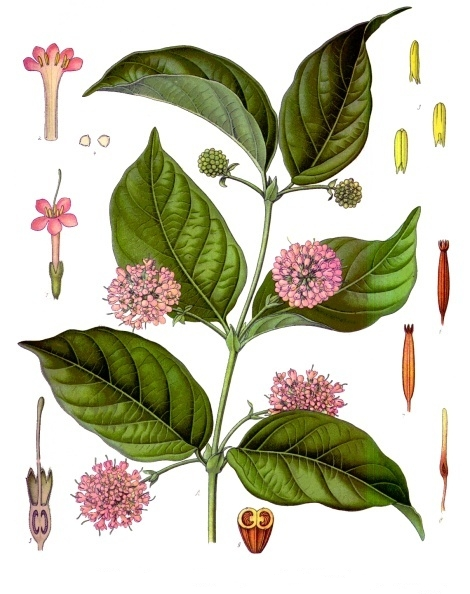

Scientific classification
- Kingdom: Plantae
- Clade: Tracheophytes
- Clade: Angiosperms
- Clade: Eudicots
- Clade: Asterids
- Order: Gentianales
- Family: Rubiaceae
- Genus: Uncaria
- Species: U. gambir

Binomial name
- Uncaria gambir (W.Hunter) Roxb., 1824

Synonyms
- Nauclea gambir Hunter; Ourouparia gambir (Hunter) Baill.; Uruparia gambir (Hunter) Kuntze

= Uncaria gambir =

Species of plant

Uncaria gambir, the gambier or gambir, is a species of plant in the genus Uncaria found in Southeast Asia, mainly Malaysia and Indonesia.

== Extract ==
Gambier extract is used or has been used as a catechu for chewing with areca and betel, for tanning and dyeing, and as herbal medicine. Gambier extract was also used by native people as a medical treatment or prevention of diseases that were believed to be spread by the now obsolete medical theory of miasma.

The Indians invented paan, a gambir paste, that was believed to help prevent miasma; it was considered as the first antimiasmatic application. The gambir tree is found in Southern India and Sri Lanka.
