= Pulai River =

River of Johor, Malaysia

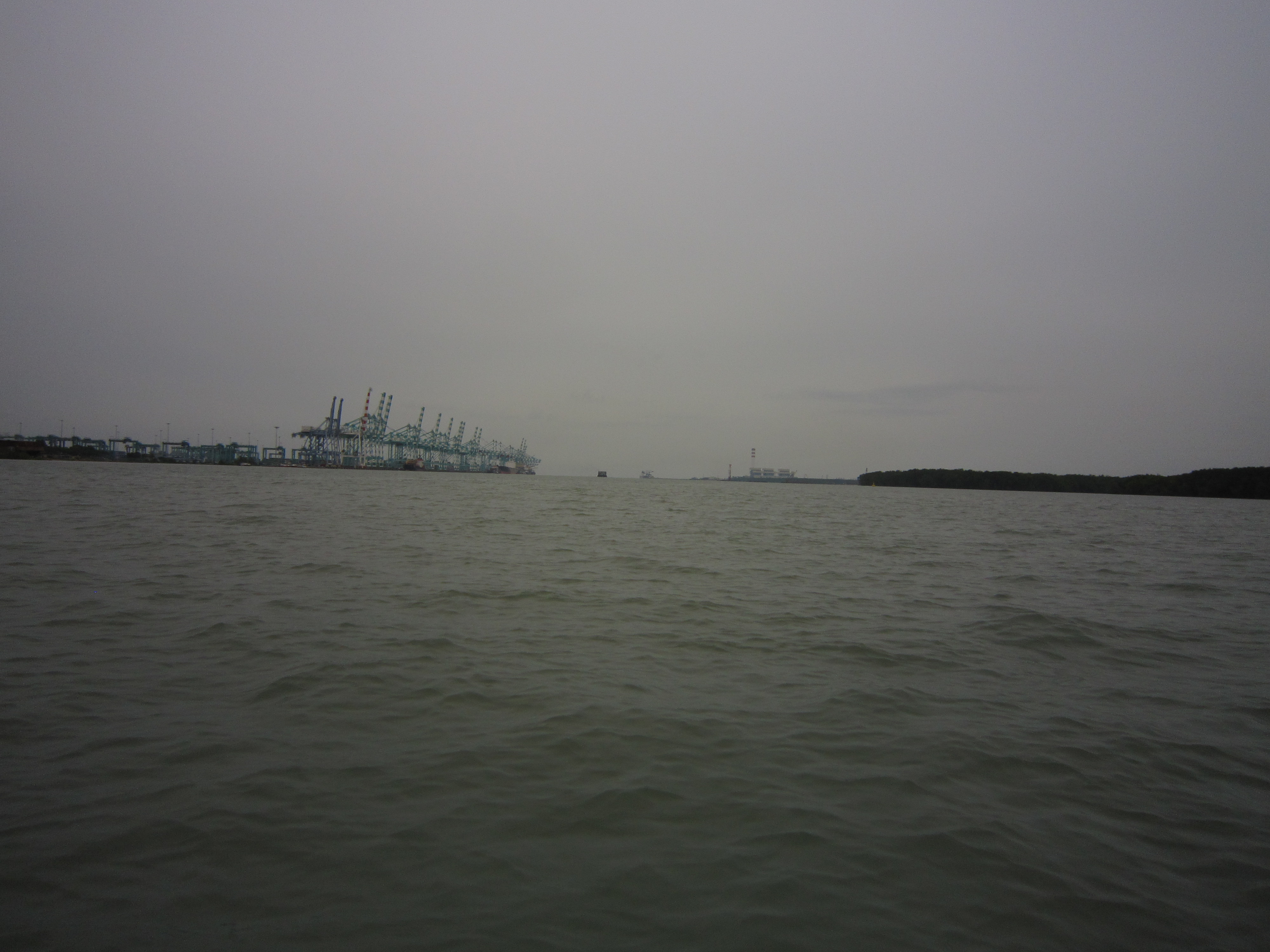
- Mouth of Pulai River in Tanjung Pelepas.
- Native name: Sungai Pulai (Malay)

Location
- Country: Malaysia
- State: Johor

Physical characteristics
- Mouth
  - location: Tebrau Straits
  - coordinates: 1°20′3″N 103°32′58″E
  - elevation: 0 m (0 ft)
- Length: 22 km (14 mi)

Basin features
- Preservation status

Ramsar Wetland
- Official name: Sungai Pulai
- Designated: 31 January 2003
- Reference no.: 1288

The Pulai River (Malay: Sungai Pulai) is a river in Johor, Malaysia. It runs from Mount Pulai in Kulai District until Tanjung Pelepas, draining into the Tebrau Straits. At its mouth lies the single largest seagrass bed in Malaysia, which extends all the way to Pulau Merambong. Sungai Pulai is also a mangrove forest reserve. The site is being studied to help manage the vast mangrove ecosystem, with assistance from University of Technology Malaysia and the National University of Malaysia, in line with the Integrated Management Plan for the sustainable use of mangroves in Johor.

Sungai Pulai is also a Ramsar site, one of the many locations in the world recognized as a wetland of international importance.

== See also ==
- Geography of Malaysia
