= Gambier (extract) =

Plant extract

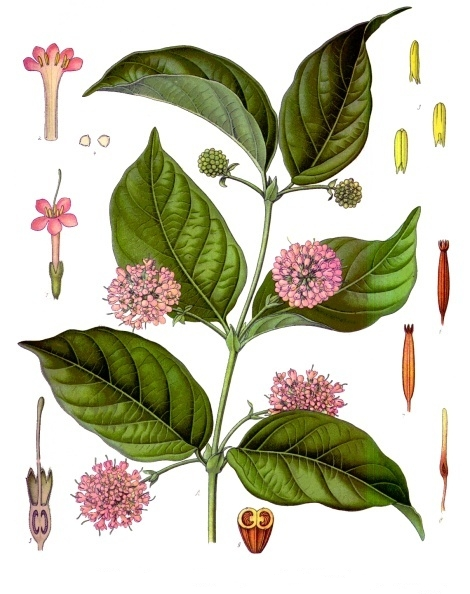
Uncaria gambir, from which gambier is produced

Gambier or gambir is an extract derived from the leaves of Uncaria gambir, a climbing shrub native to tropical Southeast Asia. Gambier is produced in Indonesia and Malaysia where it was an important trade item into the late nineteenth century. It can be used as a tanning agent, a brown dye, a food additive and as herbal medicine. Also known as pale catechu, white catechu or Japan Earth, it is often confused with other forms of catechu.

== History ==
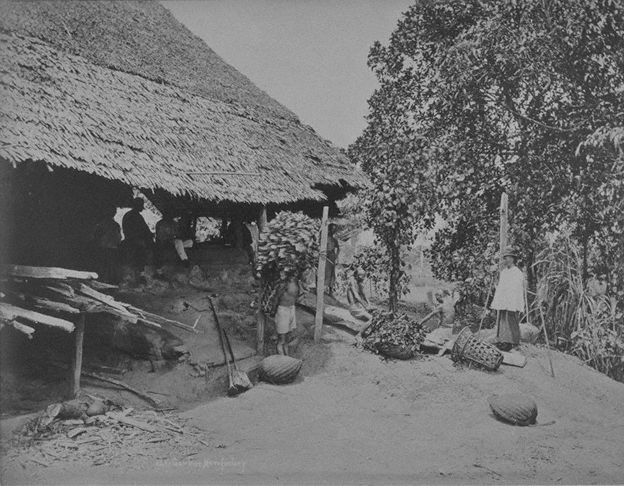
Chinese workers in a gambier and pepper plantation in Singapore, circa 1900.

Gambier production began as a traditional occupation in the Malay archipelago. By the middle of the seventeenth century, it was established in Sumatra and in the western parts of Java and the Malay peninsula. It was initially used as medicine and chewed with betel. Local Chinese also began to use gambier to tan hides. Chinese first got involved in gambier production at Riau, using coolie labor and growing black pepper as a supplemental crop. Bugis merchants traded the gambier for rice from Java and Siam, helping the Bugis to become an important regional power in the late eighteenth century.

When the British settlement of Singapore was founded in 1819, about 20 gambier plantations had already been started in the area by Chinese. The peak of Singapore's gambier trade was in the 1830s through 1850s, driven by demand from the British dyeing and leather tanning industries.

Diplomat Edmund Roberts noted that upon his visit to China in the 1830s, Chinese were using it for tanning, and noted that the uncaria gambir made "leather porous and rotten". He also noted that the Chinese would chew it with areca nut.

In the 1860s through 1880s, gambier production was expanded in nearby Johor under the kangchu system.

== Production ==
To make gambier, the leaves are first boiled in water. They absorb it and turn brownish in color. The leaves are then pressed mechanically to squeeze and extract liquid. This liquid is then dried into a semi-solid paste and molded into cubes, which are dried in the sun.

== Physical properties and composition ==
Gambier has a highly astringent taste with no odor, ranging in color from yellow to brown. It is mainly composed of cattechu-tanic acid (a tannin) and catechin (a flavan-3-ol). Commercially produced gambier may range in catechin content of less than 20% to more than 40% depending on quality. When used for making leather, catechin is converted into cattechu-tanic acid by the tanning process.

Trace components include quercetin, wax, oil, cattechu red, and gambier-fluorescien. Gambier extracts further contain chalcane-flavan dimers (gambiriins A1, A2, B1 and B2) in addition to (+)-catechin, (+)-epicatechin, and dimeric proanthocyanidins including procyanidin B1, procyanidin B3, and gambiriin C.

== Uses ==
Gambier has been used as a form of catechu for chewing with areca nut. Particularly in the nineteenth century, it was economically important as a brown dye and tanning agent. It is still used as herbal medicine, and occasionally as a food additive.
