= Iskandar Puteri City Council =

City council in Malaysia

Iskandar Puteri City Council Majlis Bandaraya Iskandar Puteri
- Local Government Act 1976
- Emblem

Type
- Type: Local authority of Iskandar Puteri

History
- Founded: 22 November 2017
- Preceded by: Johor Bahru Tengah District Council; Johor Bahru Tengah Municipal Council

Leadership
- Mayor: Hasrin Kamal Hashim (since 14 July 2025)
- Secretary: Ezahar Abu Sairin

Structure
- Seats: 24
- Political groups: Councillors: BN (24): UMNO (14); MCA (8); MIC (2)
- Length of term: 1 April 2024–31 December 2025

Motto
- Bersatu Maju (United We Progress)

Meeting place
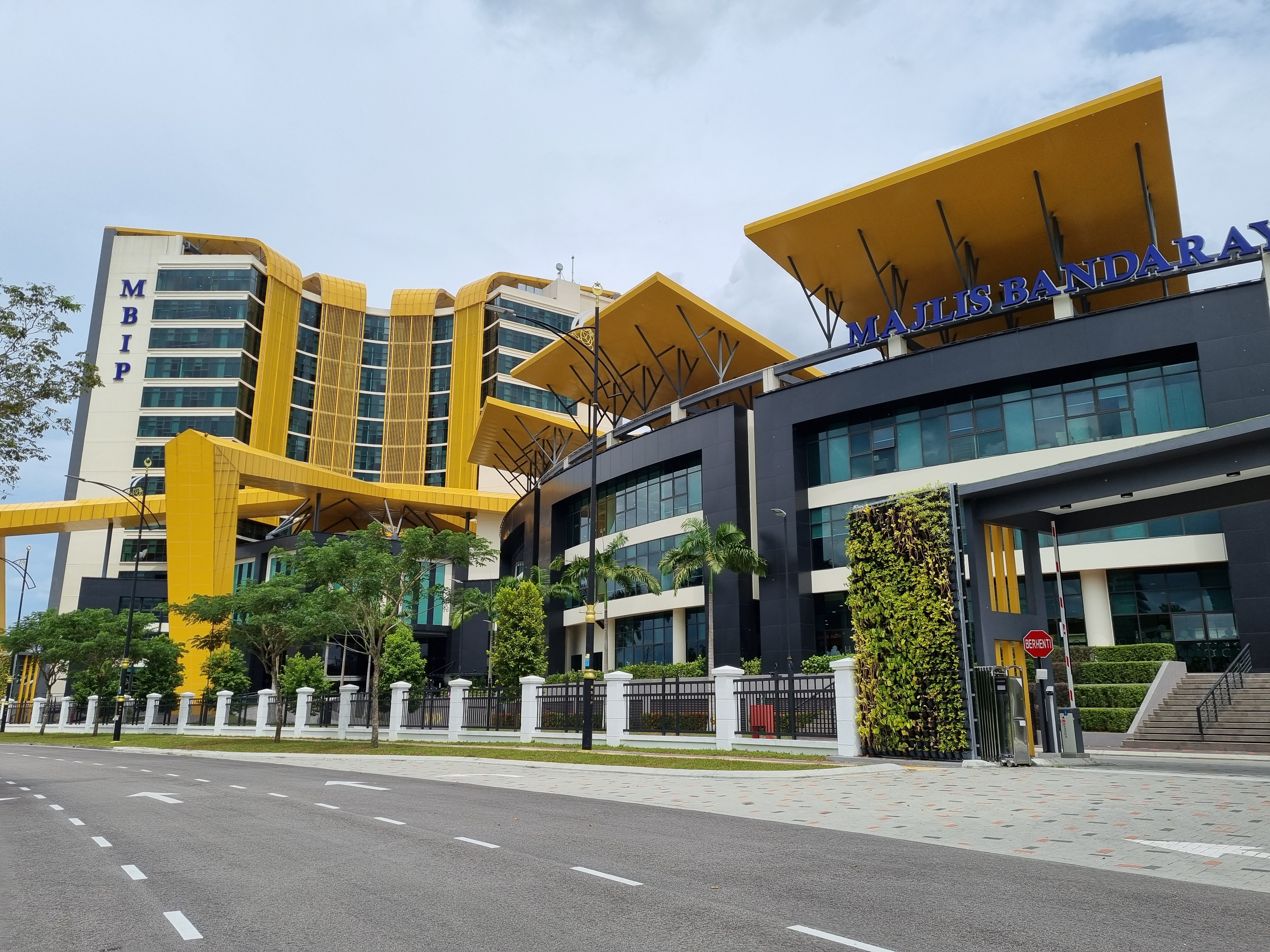
- Temenggong Ibrahim Building, Bandar Medini Iskandar

Website
- www.mbip.gov.my

The Iskandar Puteri City Council (MBIP; Malay: Majlis Bandaraya Iskandar Puteri) is the city council which administrates Iskandar Puteri City in Johor, Malaysia. This agency is under Johor state government. MBIP are responsible for public health and sanitation, waste removal and management, town planning, environmental protection and building control, social and economic development and general maintenance functions of urban infrastructure. The MBIP new headquarters is located at Medini.

== History ==
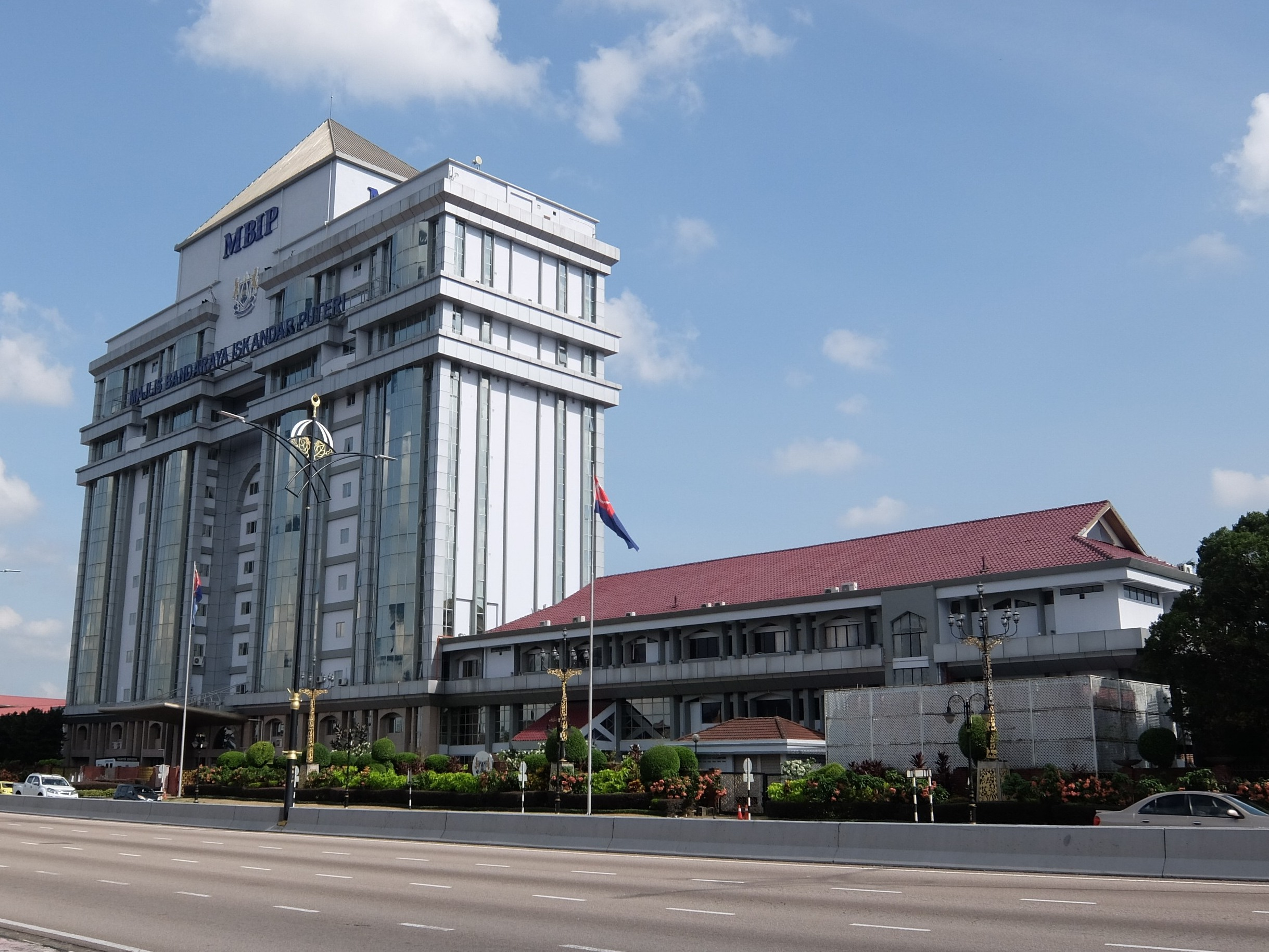
Former Johor Bahru Tengah Municipal Council Headquarters until 23 March 2021, now the Skudai branch of the Iskandar Puteri City Council.

=== Johor Bahru Tengah District Council ===
On 1 March 1978, Johor Bahru Tengah District Council (Malay: Majlis Daerah Johor Bahru Tengah) became the last local authority in the State of Johor to be formed under the Local Government Act 1976 (Act 171) by merging the local councils of Skudai, Lima Kedai, Gelang Patah, Kangkar Pulai, Ulu Choh, Ulu Tiram, Plentong and Masai. The former five councils area comprised the west part of Johor Bahru Tengah, while the rest comprised the east part.

All these local councils were established in the 1950s, with the Lima Kedai's local council being the last to be established in the Johor Bahru Tengah area. At the time of its formation, the then-district council area consisted of rural areas within the Johor Bahru District outside of Johor Bahru (governed by a municipal council), except for Pasir Gudang, governed by State-owned entreprise – Johor Corporation (JCORP). On the other hand, Kulai also a part of Johor Bahru District at the time was governed by a separate District Council (now Kulai Municipal Council) since 1 January 1976.

The Johor Bahru Tengah District Council area covered an area of 104.7 km^{2} at the time of establishment, with headquarters near Skudai main road. Initially, the headquarters consisted of only the main hall. A double-storey building, completed in 1981, was later added to the premises. By 1988, the main operations of the District Council were moved to the double-storey building. However, in the 1990s, the Skudai Building could no longer cater the increasing staff members of the council. Thus, some of the council's departments had to be operated from a rented double-storey shop office in Taman Sri Skudai, until the Johor Bahru Tengah District Council's 10-storey building was completed in 1996. Extensions of the building were built later in 2005. As the town transformed into a municipality, the road in front of the headquarters was widened from a two-lane road into one with four lanes.

=== Johor Bahru Tengah Municipal Council ===
The Johor Bahru Tengah District council's area was increased to 303.48 km^{2} on 1 July 1995 as the Greater Johor Bahru metropolitan area experience rapid development since the start of the Nusajaya township project in 1993. On 1 January 2001, the Johor Bahru Tengah District Council was upgraded to the Johor Bahru Tengah Municipal Council (Malay: Majlis Perbandaran Johor Bahru Tengah), with an initial municipality area of 338.5 km^{2}. It held its launching ceremony on the night of 31 March the same year at its premises.

The municipal council's non profit charity arm the Johor Bahru Tengah Caring Foundation (Malay: Yayasan Penyayang Johor Bahru Tengah), now the Iskandar Puteri Caring Foundation (Malay: Yayasan Penyayang Iskandar Puteri) was corporatised in March 2015 under the Trustee Act 1952 (Incorporation) and launched on 22 October the same year by Mohamed Khaled Nordin at the Taman Universiti Grand Hall in Skudai to assist the poor, the disabled and the needy communities.

=== Iskandar Puteri City Council ===
By 31 December 2015, the municipality's area had increased to 560.71 km^{2}. But the Johor State Government, on a 2 July 2014 meeting, decided to transfer some parts of Tebrau and Plentong Mukims (or former local council areas of Ulu Tiram, Plentong and Masai) to Johor Bahru City Council and Pasir Gudang Municipal Council (later became Pasir Gudang City Council) respectively through a redelineation exercise of Kulai and Johor Bahru District Municipalities which took effect on 1 January 2016. This shrank the border of the Johor Bahru Tengah municipality to only its Western portion (measuring 402.96 square kilometres (155.58 sq mi)), which became the Iskandar Puteri City limit on 22 November 2017, reusing Johor Bahru's old name. The erstwhile Johor Bahru Tengah Municipal Council was also upgraded into the Iskandar Puteri City Council that very same day, coincidentally also the birthday of Sultan Ibrahim Iskandar, who preside over its declaration event himself. Although its headquarters still remain in Skudai at that time, the newly established City Council had acquired 9.47 acres (38,300 m^{2}) of land in Medini Iskandar Malaysia, and organised a ground breaking ceremony for its soon-to-be-built new headquarters after the City Declaration Ceremony at its construction site.

=== New Medini headquarters ===
Iskandar Puteri City Council began operating from its new 13-storey-tall state-of-the-art headquarters in Medini Iskandar Malaysia on 24 March 2021, with staff gradually relocating there from the old Skudai building. On 22 November 2024, the 7th anniversary of the city council's establishment, the new headquarters was launched by Crown Prince Tunku Ismail Idris and renamed the Temenggong Ibrahim Building.

=== Emblem history ===
When the Johor Bahru Tengah District Council was established on 1 March 1978, it adopted an emblem that consisted of a green shield charged with an orange octagram, that contains a yellow star and crescent in a black circle surported on both sides by black pepper wreaths. The octagram represented the eight local councils that merged to form the Johor Bahru Tengah municipality. Below the shield is a blue ribbon with the district council's abbreviation in Malay and motto – "Bersatu Maju" ("برساتو ماجو", United We Progress or Progress Together) in Jawi script.

After upgradation of the district council as the Johor Bahru Tengah Municipal Council on 1 January 2001, a more complex emblem was adopted, consisted of an octagram quartered yellow and green placed on a white shield with the blue border written with the name of the municipal council in Jawi and Romanised Malay script. On each quarter of the octagram are the images of buildings that represent urban development, gears that represent industrial technology, computer components that represent information technology and Spanish Cherry (Malay: Bunga Tanjung) as the municipality's official flower. The shield was topped by a yellow star and crescent and supported by two tigers from the Johor State coat of arms. Below a shield is a blue ribbon decorated with black pepper wreaths with the municipal council's motto – "Bersatu Maju" (United We Progress or Progress Together) in Romanised script.

An emblem with a completely new design was adopted upon the upgradation of the Johor Bahru Tengah Municipal Council as the Iskandar Puteri City Council on 22 November 2017. It consisted of a blue shield with white outline charged with two golden black pepper wreaths that are surrounded by four white elephant tusks on both sides, the Johor State Flag at the top and a bridge and road markings at the bottom. The shield is supported by two Johor State arms tigers on both sides, and was topped by a yellow star and crescent in the original version, later replaced by the Johor Royal Crown in the 2018 revision. Below the shield is a blue ribbon with the name of the city council in Jawi and Romanised Malay script.

Emblem of Johor Bahru Tengah District Council (1978–2001)

Emblem of Johor Bahru Tengah Municipal Council (2001–2017)

Emblem of Iskandar Puteri City Council (2017–2018)

Emblem of Iskandar Puteri City Council (2018–present)

=== Presidents (Yang di-Pertua) of Johor Bahru Tengah ===
From 1978 until 2017, twelve men served as president of Johor Bahru Tengah District and Municipal Councils, with three of them also served a non-consecutive second term.

No	Name	Term start	Term end
1	Jalil Ariffi	March 1978	June 1980
2	Mohd Rashidi Md Noor (1st term)	June 1980	December 1981
3	Hashim Yahya	January 1982	September 1983
4	Abd Kadir Sam'on	October 1983	March 1988
5	Ismail A Aziz (1st term)	April 1988	November 1989
6	Mohd Noor Abd Rahim (1st term)	December 1989	November 1990
7	Mohd Rashidi Md Noor (2nd term)	December 1990	May 1993
8	Mohd Noor Abd Rahim (2nd term)	June 1993	December 1993
9	Ismail A Aziz (2nd term)	January 1994	January 1999
10	Abdullah Jaafar	March 1999	January 2003
11	Burhan Amin	January 2003	February 2006
12	Md Fuzi Ahmad Shahimi	February 2006	May 2013
13	Salehuddin Hassan	June 2013	August 2015
14	Badrul Hisham Kassim	August 2015	February 2017
15	Adib Azhari Daud	February 2017	21 November 2017

=== Mayors (Datuk Bandar) of Iskandar Puteri ===
Until the present time, five men served as mayor of Iskandar Puteri, with two of them (Adib Azhari Daud and Salehuddin Hassan) previously also served as president of Johor Bahru Tengah Municipal Council.

No	Name	Term start	Term end
1	Adib Azhari Daud	22 November 2017	19 November 2019
2	Salehuddin Hassan	20 November 2019	31 January 2021
3	Mohd Haffiz Ahmad	1 February 2021	2 January 2025
4	Ahmad Nazir Mohd Nasir	3 January 2025	13 July 2025
5	Hasrin Kamal Hashim	14 July 2025	Present

== Departments ==
- Management Services (Khidmat Pengurusan)
- Finance (Kewangan)
- Valuation & Property Management (Penilaian & Pengurusan Harta)
- Development Planning (Perancangan Pembangunan)
- Engineering (Kejuruteraan)
- Building (Bangunan)
- Public Health (Kesihatan Awam)
- Licensing (Pelesenan)
- Enforcement (Penguatkuasaan)
- Community Development (Pembangunan Masyarakat)
- Landscape (Landskap)
- Law (Undang-undang)
- Corporate & Public Relations (Korporat & Perhubungan Awam)
- Information Technology (Teknologi Maklumat)

== Units ==
- Internal Audit (Audit Dalam)
- Strategic Management (Pengurusan Strategik)
- Integrity (Integriti)
- One Stop Centre (Pusat Sehenti)
- Commissioner of Building (Pesuruhjaya Bangunan)
- Smart City (Bandar Pintar)

== Administration areas (zones) ==
As of 2025, Iskandar Puteri is divided into 24 zones represented by 24 councillors to act as mediators between residents and the city council. The councillors for the 1 April 2024 to 31 December 2025 session are as below:

Zone	Councillor	Political affiliation
Pulai Indah	Mohd Nobli Mohd Nassir	UMNO
Kangkar Pulai	Muhamad Farkhan Mohd Haron	UMNO
Pulai Utama	Teo Teck Boon	MCA
Sri Pulai	New Kian Kiong	MCA
Taman Universiti	Fakhrul Zafran Absl Kamarul	UMNO
Mutiara Rini	Hafiz Abdullah Hashim	UMNO
Lima Kedai	Siti Zaleha Abdullah	UMNO
Nusa Bayu	Mohd Akmal Melan	UMNO
Gelang Patah	Yusli Yusof	UMNO
Leisure Farm	Zainab Bakar	UMNO
Tanjung Kupang	Nur Diyana Ra'il	UMNO
Medini Iskandar Malaysia	Mohamad Khairi A. Malik	UMNO
Kota Iskandar	Yusof Ahmad	UMNO
Horizon Hills	Wong Foong Yee	MCA
Impian Emas	Lau Mei Yok	MCA
Sri Skudai	Loh Woei Der	MCA
Skudai	Sangrapandian Velliappan	MIC
Skudai Baru	Lim Soon Hai	MCA
Selesa Jaya	Tambi Omar Latip	UMNO
Taman Ungku Tun Aminah	Chuah Lee Hui	MCA
Nusa Bestari	Tan Hiang Kee	MCA
Bukit Indah	Ragu Supermaniam	MIC
Sutera Utama	Dalela Sakiaman	UMNO
Perling	Mohamed Kamalruzaman Isa	UMNO

== Branch office ==
- Perling
- Wisma Skudai
- UTC Johor

== See also ==
- Johor Bahru City Council
- Pasir Gudang City Council
