= Johor Bahru District =

District in Johor, Malaysia

- District of Johor
- Daerah Johor Bahru
- Flag Emblem
- Interactive map of Johor Bahru District
- Location of Johor Bahru District in Malaysia
- Coordinates: 1°32′N 103°43′E
- Country: Malaysia
- State: Johor
- Seat: Johor Bahru
- Local area government(s): Iskandar Puteri City Council (Johor Bahru West and North); Johor Bahru City Council (Johor Bahru City Centre); Pasir Gudang City Council (Johor Bahru East)

Government
  - District officer: Haji Abdul Rahman bin Salleh

Area
  - Total: 1,063.97 km^{2} (410.80 sq mi)

Population (2023)
  - Total: 1,758,500
  - Density: 1,652.8/km^{2} (4,280.7/sq mi)
- Time zone: UTC+8 (MST)
  - Summer (DST): UTC+8 (Not observed)
- Postcode: 79xxx - 81xxx
- Calling code: +6-07-2, +6-07-3, +6-07-5
- Vehicle registration plates: J

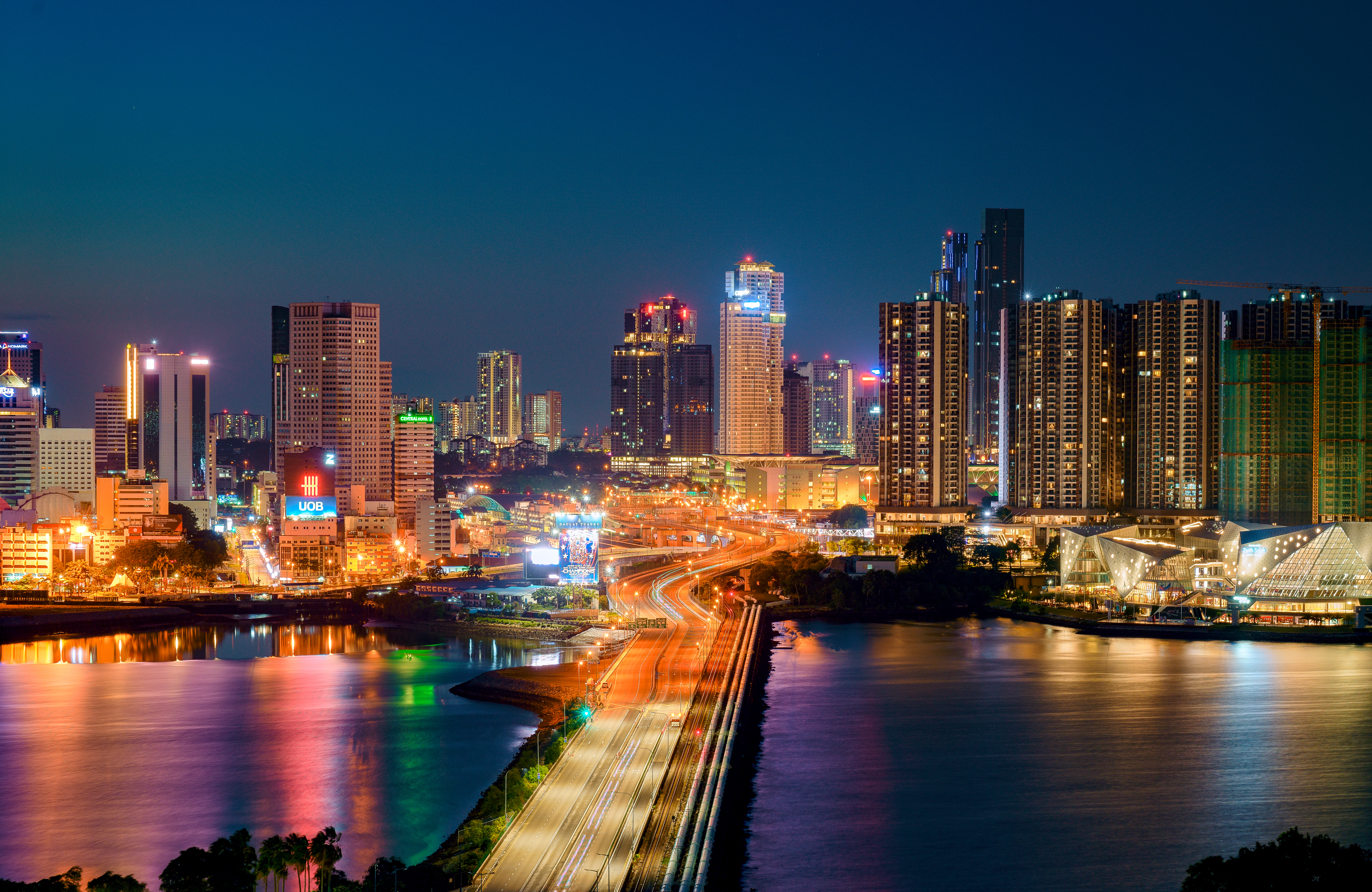
Johor Bahru District, as viewed from Singapore

The Johor Bahru District is a district located in the southern part of Johor, Malaysia. It covers an area of 1,063.97 km^{2} and has a population of 1.8 million, making it the second largest district in Malaysia by population. The district capital is Johor Bahru and the administrative capital is Iskandar Puteri. The district borders Pontian District on the west, Kota Tinggi District on the east, Kulai District on the north and Singapore to the south. The urban centres are divided into the cities of Johor Bahru, Iskandar Puteri and Pasir Gudang. Johor Bahru District is currently the second-largest gross domestic product (GDP) contributor among all districts in Malaysia.

It is host to many thriving townships such as the Tebrau area, which hosts several shopping malls including ÆON Malls, Mid Valley Southkey, Paradigm Mall Johor Bahru, Toppen Shopping Centre and an IKEA outlet.

The district office is located in Johor Bahru.

== Administrative divisions ==

Johor Bahru District is divided into 6 mukims and 2 towns (bandar).

Type	UPI Code	Mukim	Population (2020 Census)	Area (km2)	Density (km2 per person)
Mukim	010201	Jelutong	24,765	15.41	1,607
Mukim	010202	Plentong	583,640	253	2,307
Mukim	010203	Pulai	505,661	204.4	2,474
Mukim	010206	Sungai Tiram	15,627	197.1	79.30
Mukim	010207	Tanjung Kupang	24,890	85.50	291.1
Mukim	010208	Tebrau	412,373	214.3	1,925
Town (Bandar)	010240	Johor Bahru	144,179	38.54	3,741
Town (Bandar)	010242	Tebrau	56	0.057	982.5

== Demographics ==
The estimated population was 1,758,500 in 2023. At the time of the 2020 Census 51.6% of the population were Muslims, 33.1% were Buddhists, 5.1% were Hindus, 4.4% were Christians and 1.8% had another or no religion.

Historical population
Year	Pop.	±%
1991	704,471	—
2000	1,081,978	+53.6%
2010	1,334,188	+23.3%
2020	1,711,191	+28.3%
Figures before 2008 includes Kulai District. Source:

== Government ==
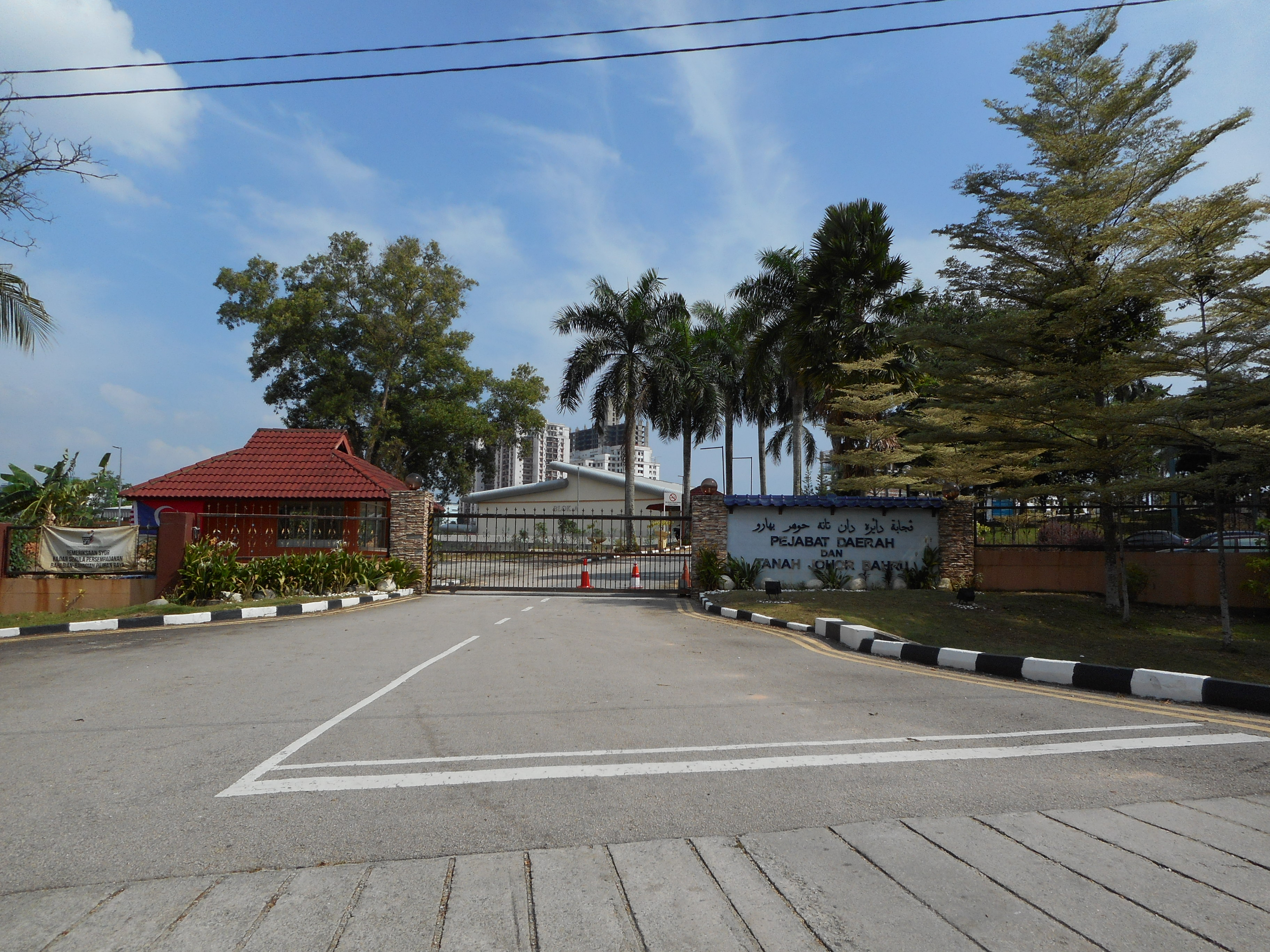
Johor Bahru District and Land Office

The district is highly urbanized have been divided and delegated to the three local governments with Johor Bahru City as the capital of Johor Bahru District, which are:

Johor Bahru City Council

The Johor Bahru City Council (MBJB) governs the city centre of Johor Bahru. It also exercises jurisdiction includes Larkin, Tebrau, Ulu Tiram, Bandar Dato Onn, Kempas, Tampoi, Johor Jaya, Permas Jaya and partly Taman Rinting.

Iskandar Puteri City Council

The Iskandar Puteri City Council (MBIP) administers the area of the city of Iskandar Puteri which includes Skudai, Gelang Patah, Taman Perling, Kangkar Pulai, Tanjung Kupang and Tanjung Pelepas.

Pasir Gudang City Council

The Pasir Gudang City Council (MBPG) governs the eastern parts of the district with the populated areas such as Pasir Gudang, Masai, Bandar, Seri Alam, Taman Kota Masai, Kong Kong and Sungai Tiram.

== Other towns ==
- Skudai
- Masai
- Pandan
- Plentong
- Gelang Patah
- Tampoi
- Ulu Tiram
- Kempas
- Kangkar Pulai
- Ulu Choh

== Federal Parliament and State Assembly Seats ==
Members of Parliament for Johor Bahru District Malaysian general election, 2022
- DAP (PH): 1 / 5
- PKR (PH): 3 / 5
- AMANAH (PH): 1 / 5

List of Johor Bahru district representatives in the Federal Parliament (Dewan Rakyat)

Parliament	Seat Name	Member of Parliament	Party
P158	Tebrau	Jimmy Puah Wee Tse	Pakatan Harapan (PKR)
P159	Pasir Gudang	Hassan Abdul Karim	Pakatan Harapan (PKR)
P160	Johor Bahru	Akmal Nasrullah Mohd Nasir	Pakatan Harapan (PKR)
P161	Pulai	Suhaizan Kayat	Pakatan Harapan (AMANAH)
P162	Iskandar Puteri	Liew Chin Tong	Pakatan Harapan (DAP)
P163	Kulai	Teo Nie Ching	Pakatan Harapan (DAP)
P165	Tanjung Piai	Wee Jeck Seng	Barisan Nasional (MCA)

List of Johor Bahru district representatives in the State Legislative Assembly (Dewan Undangan Negeri)

Parliament	State	Seat Name	State Assemblyman	Party
P158	N40	Tiram	Abdul Halim Suleiman	Barisan Nasional (UMNO)
P158	N41	Puteri Wangsa	Maszlee Malik	Pakatan Harapan (PKR)
P159	N42	Johor Jaya	Chan San San	Barisan Nasional (MCA)
P159	N43	Permas	Baharuddin Mohd Taib	Barisan Nasional (UMNO)
P160	N44	Larkin	Mohd Hairi Md Shah	Barisan Nasional (UMNO)
P160	N45	Stulang	Chen Kah Eng	Pakatan Harapan (DAP)
P161	N46	Perling	Pannir Selvam Paliksina	Barisan Nasional (MIC)
P161	N47	Kempas	Ramlee Bohani	Barisan Nasional (UMNO)
P162	N48	Skudai	Kartiyaini Jeyapalan	Pakatan Harapan (DAP)
P162	N49	Kota Iskandar	Pandak Ahmad	Barisan Nasional (UMNO)
P163	N51	Bukit Batu	Kumaran Ramakrishnan	Barisan Nasional (MIC)
P165	N55	Pekan Nanas	Tan Eng Meng	Barisan Nasional (MCA)

== Economy ==
The main economy activities in the district are international trading, manufacturing, medical and healthcare.

== Education ==
There are a total of 41 secondary schools, one religious school, three vocational schools, one technical secondary school and one fully residential school.

== Transportation ==
=== Rail ===
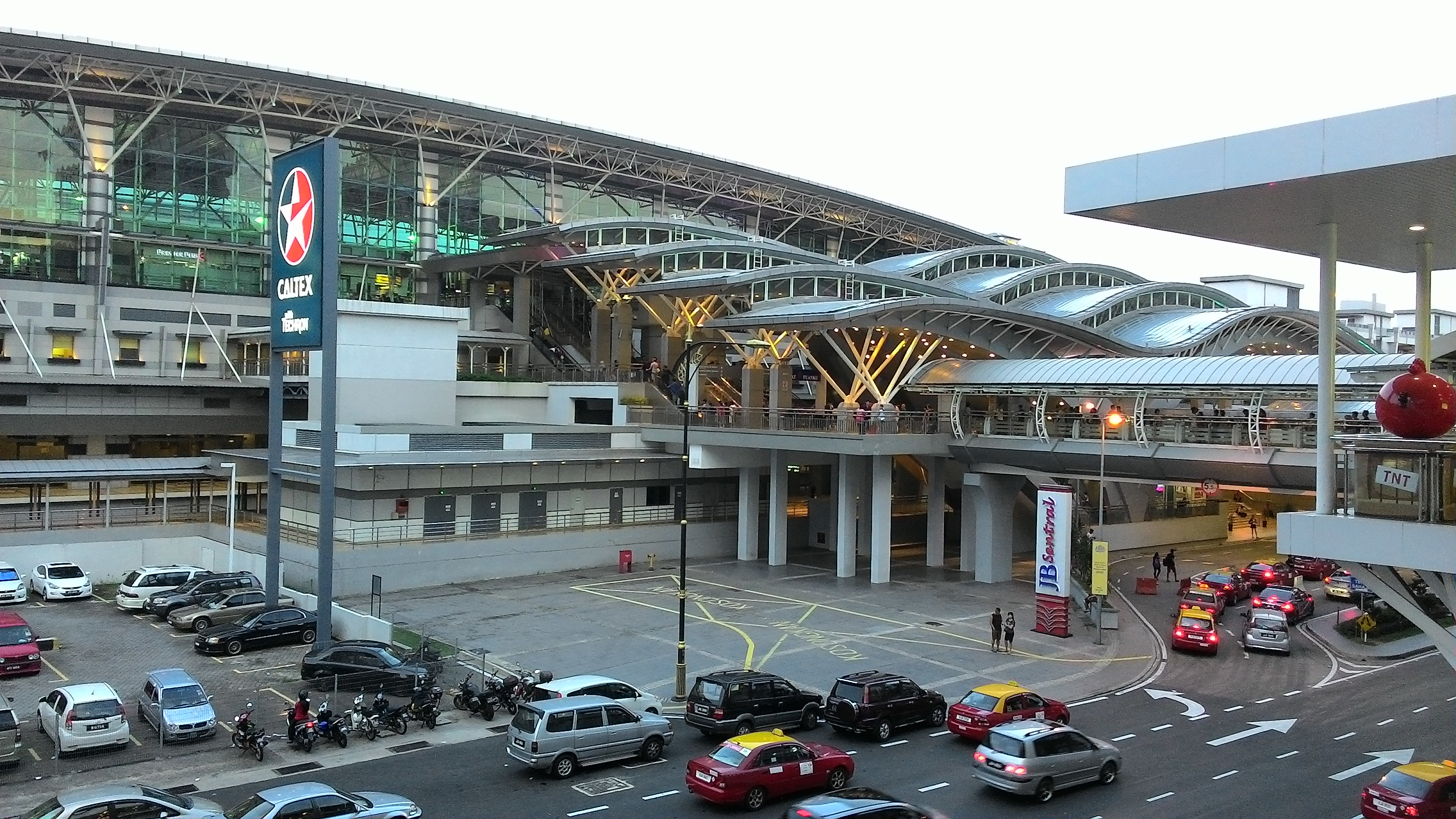
Johor Bahru Sentral railway station

The district has two railway stations, which are Johor Bahru Sentral and Kempas Baru.

=== Road ===
The Johor Bahru Eastern Dispersal Link Expressway, Pasir Gudang Highway, Johor Bahru East Coast Highway, Iskandar Coastal Highway, Skudai–Pontian Highway, Skudai Highway, Johor Bahru–Kota Tinggi Highway and Senai–Desaru Expressway links most of the cities and towns in Johor Bahru District. The district is linked to other districts in Johor and other states in Peninsular Malaysia via the North–South Expressway.

==== Singapore ====
The district is also linked to Singapore via Johor–Singapore Causeway and Malaysia–Singapore Second Link.

=== Sea ===
Ports in the district are Johor Port, Tanjung Langsat Port and Port of Tanjung Pelepas.

=== Air ===
In terms of air travel, the district is served by Senai International Airport which is located approximately 22 kilometres (14 mi) northwest of the Johor Bahru city centre. Another alternative airport is Singapore Changi Airport which is 36.3 kilometres (22.6 mi) southeast of Johor Bahru, across the border into neighbouring Singapore, and is linked by a frequent cross-border coach service operated by Transtar Travel.
