= Kulai Municipal Council =

Coordinates: 1°40′N 103°36′E

Kulai Municipal Council Majlis Perbandaran Kulai
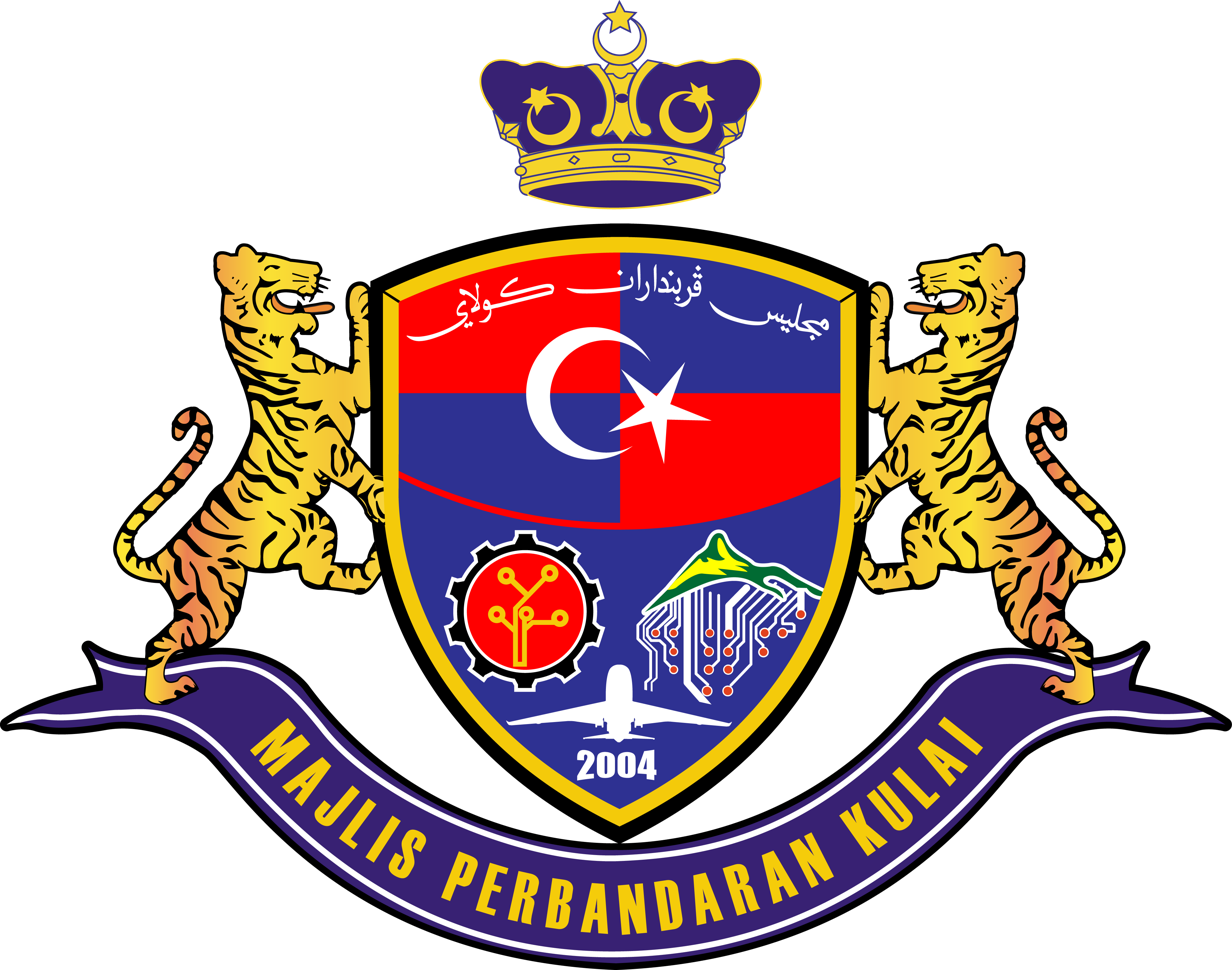
- Emblem

Type
- Type: Local authority of Kulai

History
- Founded: 21 April 2004
- Preceded by: Kulai District Council

Leadership
- President: Mohd Hafiz Aliman
- Secretary: Azmee Awang

Structure
- Seats: 24
- Political groups: Councillors: BN (24): UMNO (15); MCA (7); MIC (2)
- Length of term: 1 April 2024–31 December 2025

Motto
- Cemerlang, Sejahtera (Excellent, Peaceful)

Meeting place
- MPKU Tower, Kulai

Website
- www.mpkulai.gov.my

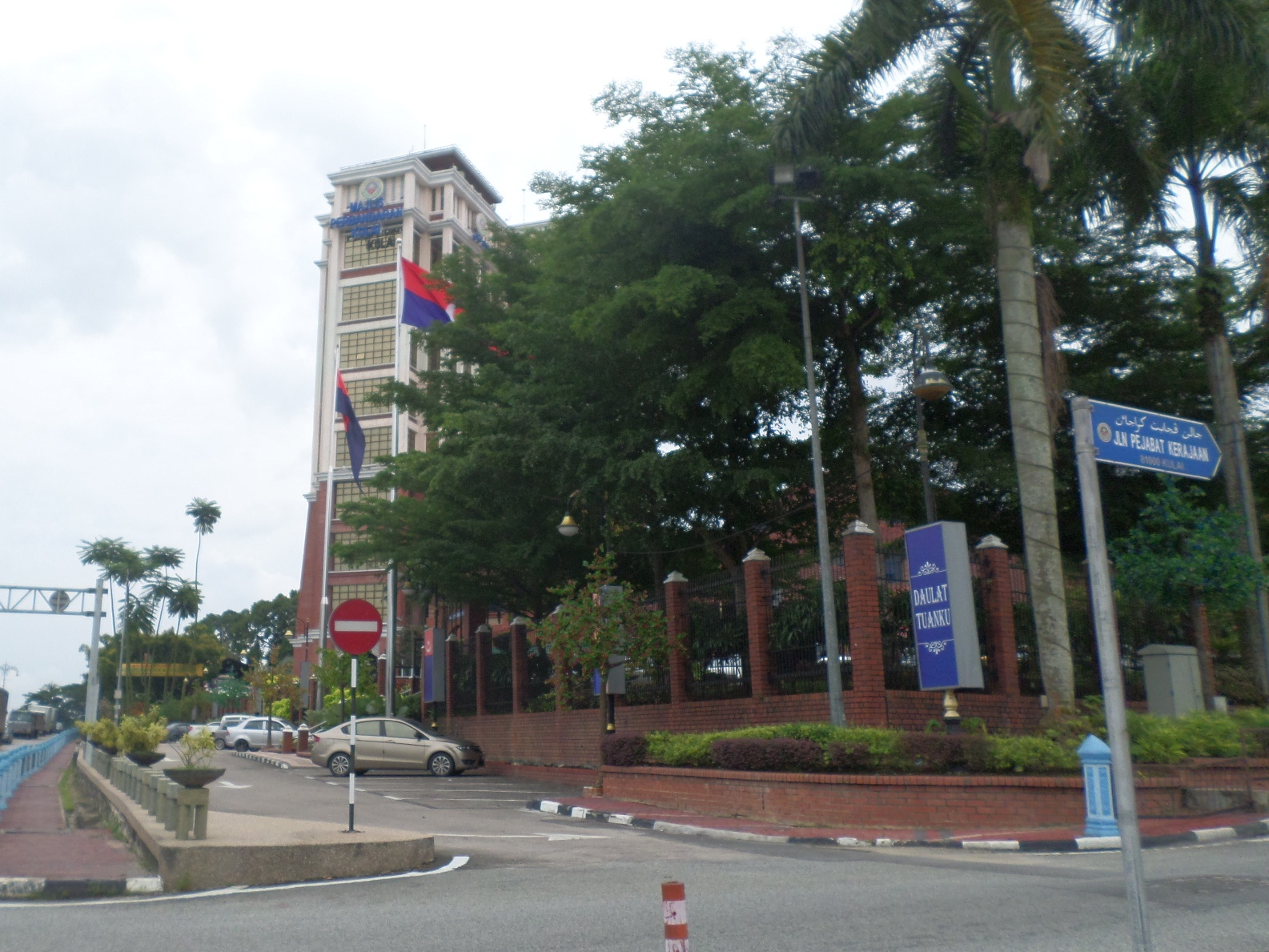
Entrance to MPKU Tower, at the junction of Jalan Besar and Jalan Pejabat Kerajaan

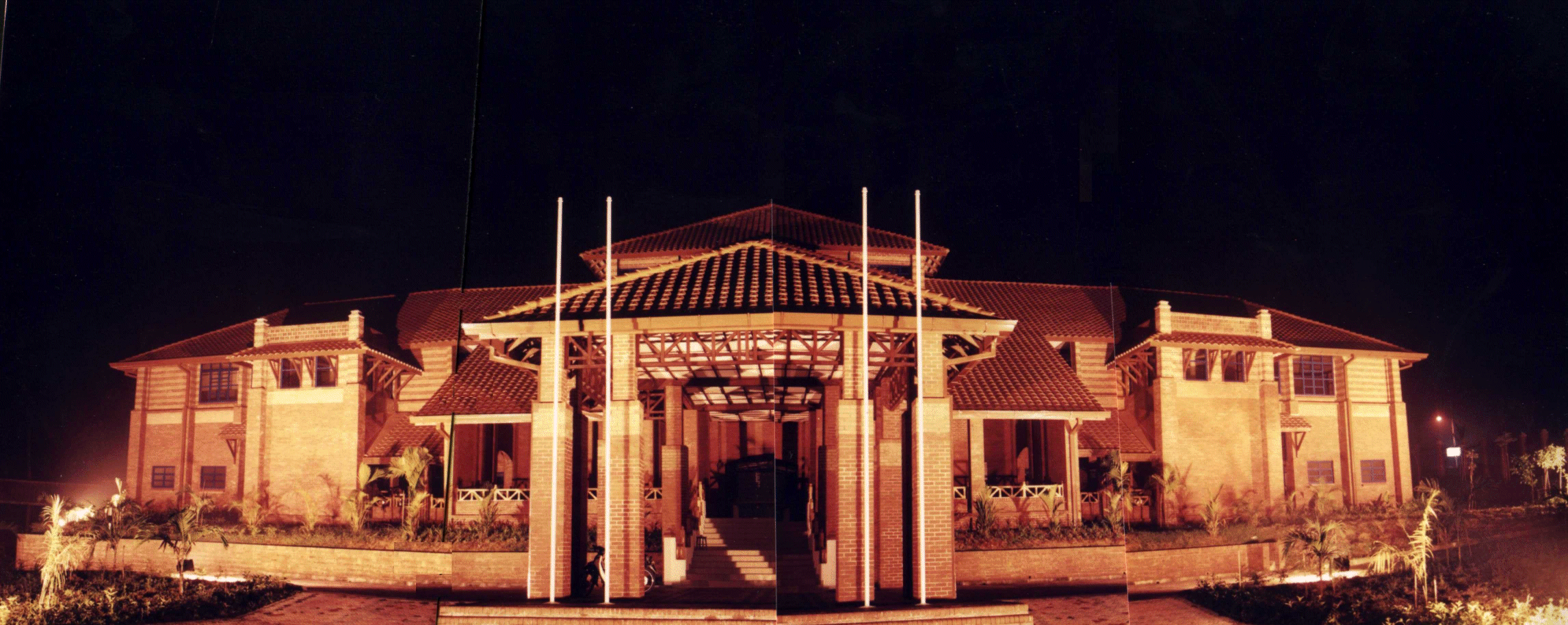
MPKU Building in 2000, taken before the construction of a new building.

Kulai Municipal Council (Malay: Majlis Perbandaran Kulai, MPKU) is the local authority of Kulai District in Johor, Malaysia since 21 April 2004. It was formerly known as Kulai District Council (Malay: Majlis Daerah Kulai, MDK) from 1 January 1976 until 20 April 2004. Over the years, its administrative area increases from 123 km^{2} to 747 km^{2}.

The council covers nine towns in Kulai District, namely: Kulai, Saleng, Senai, Seelong, Sengkang, Sedenak, Kelapa Sawit, Ayer Bemban and Bukit Batu. These towns had their own local councils prior to merger and formation of the then-District Council.

MPKU's headquarters has been located at the Kulai District government complex in Taman Kulai since the establishment of the Kulai District Council, with the old building fronting the new office building at the entrance of the headquarters' premises.

== Emblem history ==
When Kulai District Council was established on 1 January 1976, its emblem consisted of two mousedeers supporting a shield depicting a star and crescent at the bottom to symbolise Islamic faith and nine stars on top to symbolise the nine towns that united under the local government. At the bottom of shield is a scroll bearing the District Council's name in Jawi Malay with two palm fronds. The name of the District Council in Romanised Malay was written at the top of the shield.

After the upgradation of Kulai District Council as the Kulai Municipal Council on 21 April 2004, the local government's emblem consisted of a blue semicircle at the top and nine red stairs at the bottom in v-shaped formation on a blue shield surrounded by two palm fronds. At the top half are a Rub el Hizb that symbolise Islamic Faith and a book to symbolise knowledge, while at the bottom half is a white aircraft that symbolise the Senai Airport. The nine red stairs symbolise the nine towns under the Municipal Council that are developed by stages. The emblem also featured the motto of the Municipal Council – Cemerlang, Sejahtera (Excellent, Peaceful) in Romanised Malay on a blue scroll, topped by a yellow star and crescent and the name of the Municipal Council written in both Jawi and Romanised Malay script on a yellow scroll at the bottom.

An emblem with a completely new design was adopted in conjunction with Sultan Ibrahim Iskandar's Birthday on 22 November 2018. It consists of a blue shield charged with the flag of Kulai District at the top defaced by the name of the Municipal Council in Jawi Malay script. At the bottom, there are a ten teeth gear to symbolise industrial development, an aircraft to represent Senai Airport, the Mount Pulai representation as well as electronic circuit board to symbolise the ICT Industry and the number 2004 – the year of Kulai Municipal Council's establishment. The shield is supported by two Johor State arms tigers on both sides and topped by the Johor Royal Crown. At the bottom of the shield is a blue scroll with the name of the Municipal Council in Romanised Malay script.

Emblem of Kulai District Council (1976–2004)

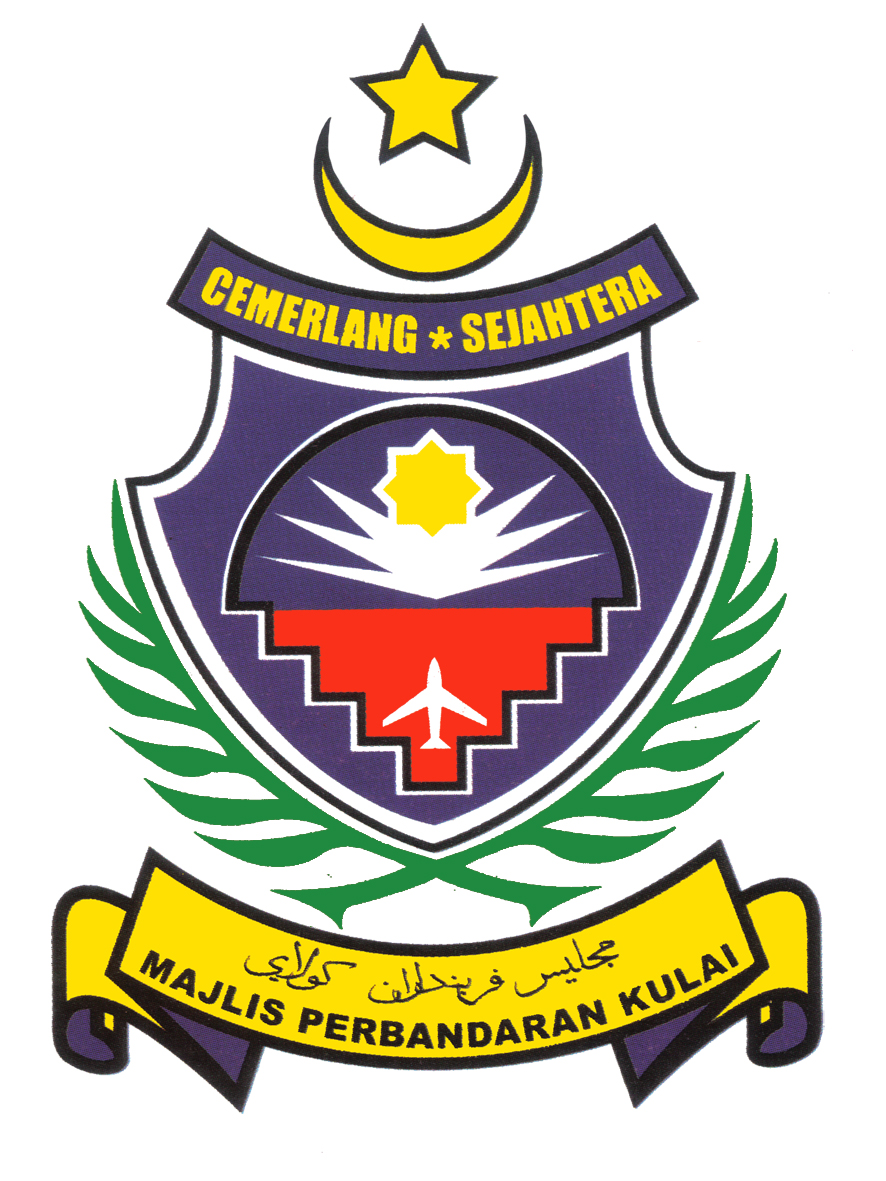
Emblem of Kulai Municipal Council (2004–2018)

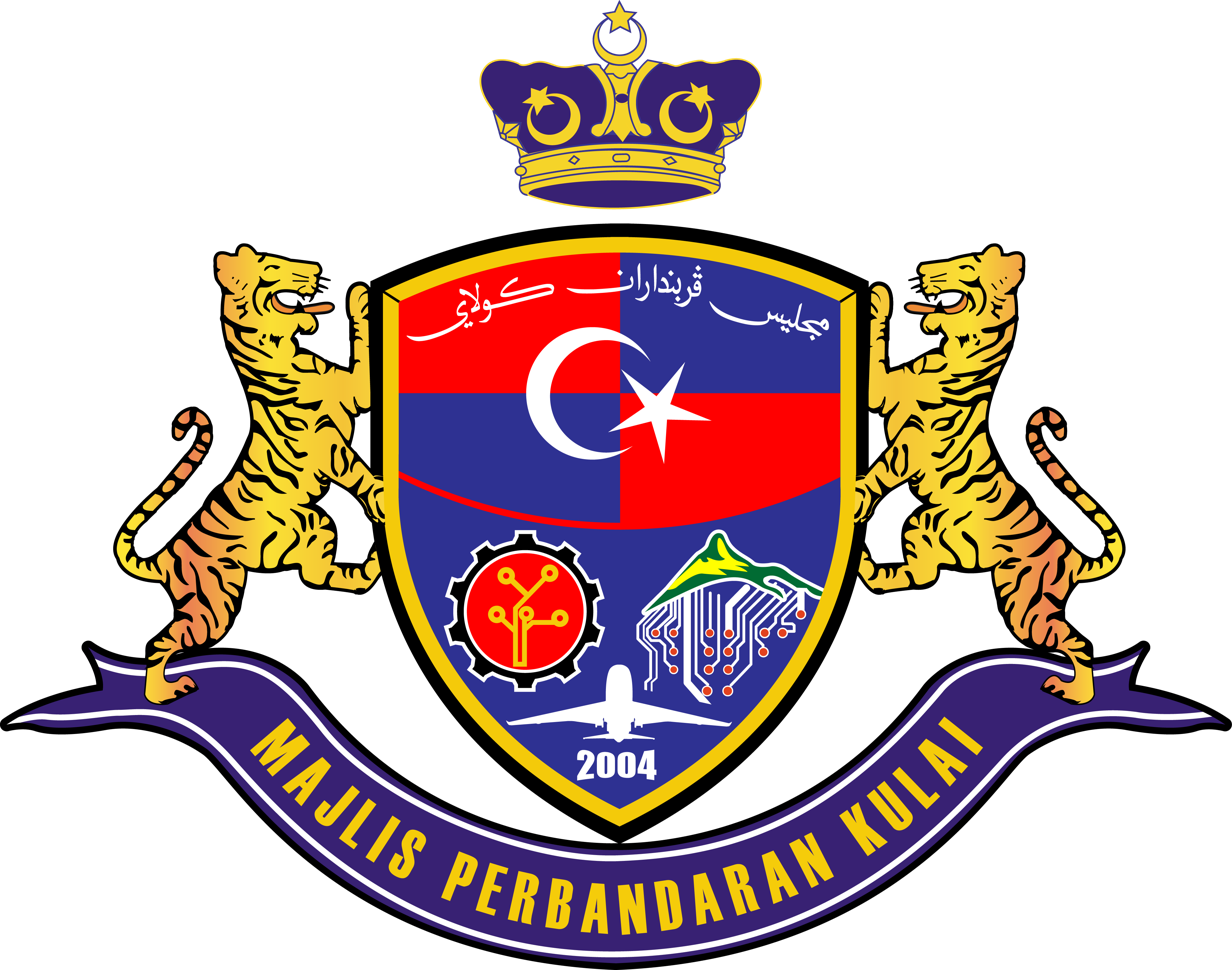
Emblem of Kulai Municipal Council (2018–present)

== Presidents of Kulai (Yang di-Pertua) ==
#	Name of Presidents	Term start	Term end
1.	Jalil Ariffin	1978	1980
2.	Mohd Rashidi Mohd Noor	1980	1982
3.	Hashim Yahya	1982	1983
4.	Abdul Kadir Sam'on	1983	1988
5.	Ismail Aziz	1988	1995
6.	Mohd Noor A Rahim	1995	1999
7.	Baderi Dasuki	1999	2000
8.	Malick Awang	2000	2003
9.	Abd Razak Md Salleh	2003	2004
10.	Rashid Sihes	2004	2006
11.	Ismail Karim	2006	2010
12.	Elias Hasran	2010	2011
13.	Md Rofiki Kiyai Shamsudin	2011	2014
14.	Abdul Rahman Salleh	2014	2017
15.	Farizan Ismail	2017	2018
16.	Mohamed Shakib Ali	2018	2021
17.	Natazha Hariss	2021	2023
18.	Mohd Fahmi Salam	2023	2025
19.	Mohd Hafiz Aliman	13 March 2025	present

== Secretaries of Kulai (Setiausaha) ==
#	Name of Secretaries	Term start	Term end
1.	Subawi Fandi Supian	1977	1978
2.	Othman Jaabar	1978	1980
3.	Md Naim Nasir	1980	1981
4.	Jama Johan	1981	1983
5.	Abd Razak Md Salleh	1983	1986
6.	Abd Jamal Puteh	1986	1991
7.	Halim Haron	1991	1992
8.	Elias Hasran	1992	1994
9.	Ungku Mohd Zam Ungku A.Majid	1994	1995
10.	Mohd Yahya Sarpan	1995	1999
11.	Muji Salmon	1999	2000
12.	Mohd Nasir Abd Salam	2000	2002
13.	A.Rahim Nin	2002	2004
14.	On Bin Jaabar@Jaafar	2004	2006
15.	Abdul Rahman Salleh	2006	2008
16.	Ismail Abu	2008	2011
17.	Mohd Farid Hasan	2011	2015
18.	Zainor Adani	2015	2016
19.	Norliyati Md Nor	2016	2018
20.	Norrizam Muhamad	2018	2019
21.	Azra Mohammaed	2019	2022
22.	Muhammad Syahrizat Alwee	2022	2024
23.	Azmee Awang	2024	present

== Departments ==
- Management Services (Khidmat Pengurusan)
- Finance (Kewangan)
- Valuation And Property Management (Penilaian Dan Pengurusan Harta)
- Town Planning and Landscape (Perancangan Bandar Dan Landskap)
- Engineering (Kejuruteraan)
- Public Health (Kesihatan Awam)
- Development (Pembangunan)
- Enforcement (Penguatkuasaan)
- Licensing (Pelesenan)
- Community Development (Pembangunan Masyarakat)

== Units ==
- Law (Undang-undang)
- Internal Audit (Audit Dalam)
- Corporate & Public Relations (Korporat & Perhubungan Awam)
- One Stop Centre (Pusat Sehenti)

== Administration areas (zones) ==
As of 2025, Kulai is divided into 24 zones represented by 24 councillors to act as mediators between residents and the municipal council. The councillors for the 1 April 2024 to 31 December 2025 session are as below:

Zone	Councillor	Political affiliation
Pulai Jaya	Noorisham Ismail	UMNO
Taman Aman	Mohd Nor Nari	UMNO
Senai	Wong Pow Kyan	MCA
Taman Senai Industri	Ahmad Nizam Mohamad	UMNO
Senai Airport City	Siva Chandran Appalasamy	MIC
Seelong	Abu Bakar A Rashid	UMNO
Hutan Bandar Putra	Nurul Nadia Ab Azis	UMNO
Bandar Putra Kulai	Mohd Yazit Mohd Khail	UMNO
Saleng	Law Wei Siong	MCA
Taman Muhibbah	Mohamad Hishamuddin Samuri	UMNO
Kulai Besar	Leong Zhan Quan Kent	MCA
Indahpura	Tan Kian Mean	MCA
Kulai Timur	Johari Seman	UMNO
Taman Anjaria	Din Mohamad	UMNO
Town Centre	Tan Hwee See	MCA
Kampung Melayu	Nazlei Abdul Razak	UMNO
Kulai Baru	Chong Yee Chien	MCA
Gemilang	Shanmatha Kumaran Pongavanam	MIC
Taman Putri	Mohd Fadil Misnan	UMNO
Lagenda Putra	Suhaizan Sukemi	UMNO
Public Housing (Rumah Awam)	Shaharuddin Md Taib	UMNO
Kelapa Sawit	Woon Jone Haw	MCA
Taman Wawasan	Amirul Iman Anuar	UMNO
Bukit Batu	Muhammad Nur Hidayat Soeb	UMNO

== See also ==
- Local government in Malaysia
