= Johor State Route J165 =

Federal road in Johor state, Malaysia

Johor Route 165
- Jalan Sawah

Route information
- Length: 13.1 km (8.1 mi)
- Existed: 1991–present
- History: Completed in 1994

Major junctions
- Northwest end: Kulai
- FT 1 Federal Route 1 J165 Kulai–NSE Highway; North–South Expressway Southern Route / AH2; J119 Jalan Pekan Nenas Utara
- Southeast end: Kampung Setia Jaya

Location
- Country: Malaysia
- Primary destinations: Gunung Pulai, Pekan Nenas, Pontian

Highway system
- Highways in Malaysia; Expressways; Federal; State

Jalan Sawah, Johor State Route J165, formerly Federal Route 399 is a state road in Johor state, Malaysia.

The Kilometre Zero is located at the junction of the Federal Route 1 at Kulai town centre (see also Kulai–NSE Highway).

At most sections, the State Route J165 was built under the JKR R5 road standard, with a speed limit of 90 km/h.

== Junction lists ==
The entire route is located in Johor.

Legend:

- I/C - Interchange, I/S - Intersection, RSA - Rest and service area, OBR - Overhead bridge restaurant, R/R - Restaurant and rest plaza, L/B - Layby, V/P - Vista point, TN - tunnel, T/P - Toll plaza, BR - Bridge
- C - Cloverleaf, S - Stack, T-A - Trumpet-A, T-B - Trumpet-B, DT - Directional-T/Y, SDT - Semi-Directional-T/Y, P-Y - Partial-Y, D - Diamond, P-C - Partial cloverleaf, D-D - Diverging diamond, D-R - Direct ramp

District	Location	km	mi	Name	Destinations	Notes
Kulai	Gunung Pulai			Kulai-NSE–Kulai	see also J165 Kulai–NSE Highway (Jalan Alor Bukit)	
Kulai	Gunung Pulai			Kulai-NSE	North–South Expressway Southern Route / AH2 – Kuala Lumpur, Malacca City, Sedenak, Senai, Tuas, Skudai, Johor Bahru	T-junctions
Kulai	Gunung Pulai			Gunung Pulai Estate		
Kulai	Gunung Pulai			Gunung Pulai Forest Reserve		
Pontian	Gunung Pulai			Jalan Gunung Pulai	Jalan Gunung Pulai – Gunung Pulai Recreational Forest, Gunung Pulai waterfalls	T-junctions
Pontian	Gunung Pulai			Kampung Sawah		
Pontian	Gunung Pulai			Kampung Setia Jaya	J119 Jalan Pekan Nenas Utara – Kayu Ara Pasong, Pekan Nenas, Pontian, Johor Bahru	T-junctions
1.000 mi = 1.609 km; 1.000 km = 0.621 mi
