= Kulai–NSE Highway =

Road in Malaysia

Johor Route 165
- Kulai-NSE Highway (Jalan Alor Bukit)

Route information
- Length: 5 km (3.1 mi)
- Existed: 1991–present
- History: Completed in 1994

Major junctions
- Northwest end: Kulai Interchange
- North–South Expressway Southern Route / AH2; FT 1 Federal Route 1
- Southeast end: Kulai

Location
- Country: Malaysia
- Primary destinations: Taman Puteri Kulai, Gunung Pulai, Kuala Lumpur, Johor Bahru

Highway system
- Highways in Malaysia; Expressways; Federal; State

Kulai-NSE Highway or Jalan Alor Bukit, Johor State Route J165, formerly Federal Route 399 is a major highway in Johor state, Malaysia. It is the only former federal road in Malaysia constructed as a 2-lane freeway by an expressway concessionaire company (PLUS Expressways) as a part of the North–South Expressway project. It is also a main route to North–South Expressway Southern Route via Kulai Interchange.

== Junction lists ==
The entire route is located in Kulai District, Johor.

Legend:

- I/C - Interchange, I/S - Intersection, RSA - Rest and service area, OBR - Overhead bridge restaurant, R/R - Restaurant and rest plaza, L/B - Layby, V/P - Vista point, TN - tunnel, T/P - Toll plaza, BR - Bridge
- C - Cloverleaf, S - Stack, T-A - Trumpet-A, T-B - Trumpet-B, DT - Directional-T/Y, SDT - Semi-Directional-T/Y, P-Y - Partial-Y, D - Diamond, P-C - Partial cloverleaf, D-D - Diverging diamond, D-R - Direct ramp

Location	km	mi	Exit	Name	Destinations	Notes
Kulai			252	Kulai-NSE I/C	North–South Expressway Southern Route / AH2 – Kuala Lumpur, Malacca City, Sedenak, Tuas, Skudai, Johor Bahru	Trumpet interchange
Kulai			Kulai Toll Plaza			
Kulai			4	Jalan Sawah I/S	J165 Jalan Sawah – Pontian, Pekan Nanas, Gunung Pulai	T-junctions
Kulai			3	Puteri Kulai–Lagenda I/S	Jalan Lagenda – Taman Lagenda; Persiaran Sri Puteri Utama – Taman Puteri Kulai	T-junctions
Kulai			2	Taman Puteri Kulai I/S	Persiaran Sri Puteri Utama – Taman Puteri Kulai	T-junctions
Kulai	0.0	0.0	1	Kulai; Jalan Kulai I/S	FT 1 Malaysia Federal Route 1 – Segamat, Yong Peng, Ayer Hitam, Batu Pahat, Simpang Renggam, Sedenak, Kulai, Kota Tinggi, Senai International Airport, Senai, Skudai, Johor Bahru	T-junctions
1.000 mi = 1.609 km; 1.000 km = 0.621 mi: Electronic toll collection
