= Kulai =

Kulai کولاي
- Town and district capital

Chinese transcription(s)
  - Simplified: 古来
  - Traditional: 古來
  - Pinyin: Gǔlái
  - Hakka: Kú-lòi
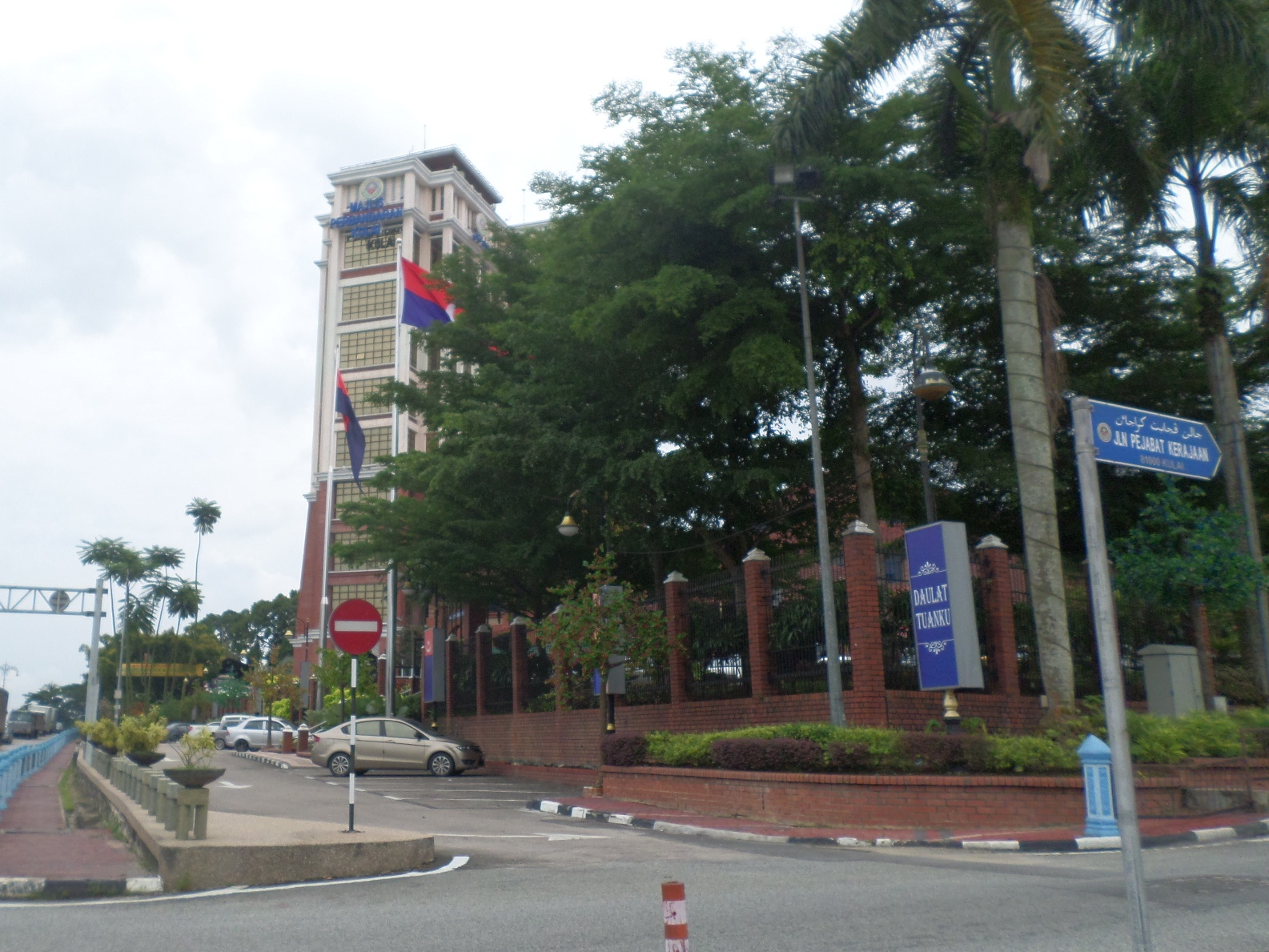

- Coat of arms
- Nicknames: Kulaijaya, The Turtle Town (Gui Lai)
- Motto: Cemerlang, Sejahtera (Malay) "Excellent, Peaceful" (motto of Kulai Municipal Council)
- Location within Malaysia
- Coordinates: 1°40′00″N 103°36′00″E
- Country: Malaysia
- State: Johor
- District: Kulai
- Establishment: 1892
- Local Council: 1950
- District Council: 1 January 1976
- Municipality status: 21 April 2004

Government
  - Type: Local Government
  - Body: Kulai Municipal Council
  - President: Haji Abdul Rahman Salleh
  - Kulai Member of Parliament: Teo Nie Ching (DAP)

Area
  - Total: 747.00 km^{2} (288.42 sq mi)

Population (2023) (within MPKu administrative area)
  - Total: 352,290
  - Rank: 29th
  - Density: 471.61/km^{2} (1,221.5/sq mi)
- Time zone: UTC+8 (MST)
  - Summer (DST): Not observed
- Postal code: 81000
- Area code: +6-07
- Vehicle registration: J
- Website: www.mpkulai.gov.my

Kulai Municipal Council

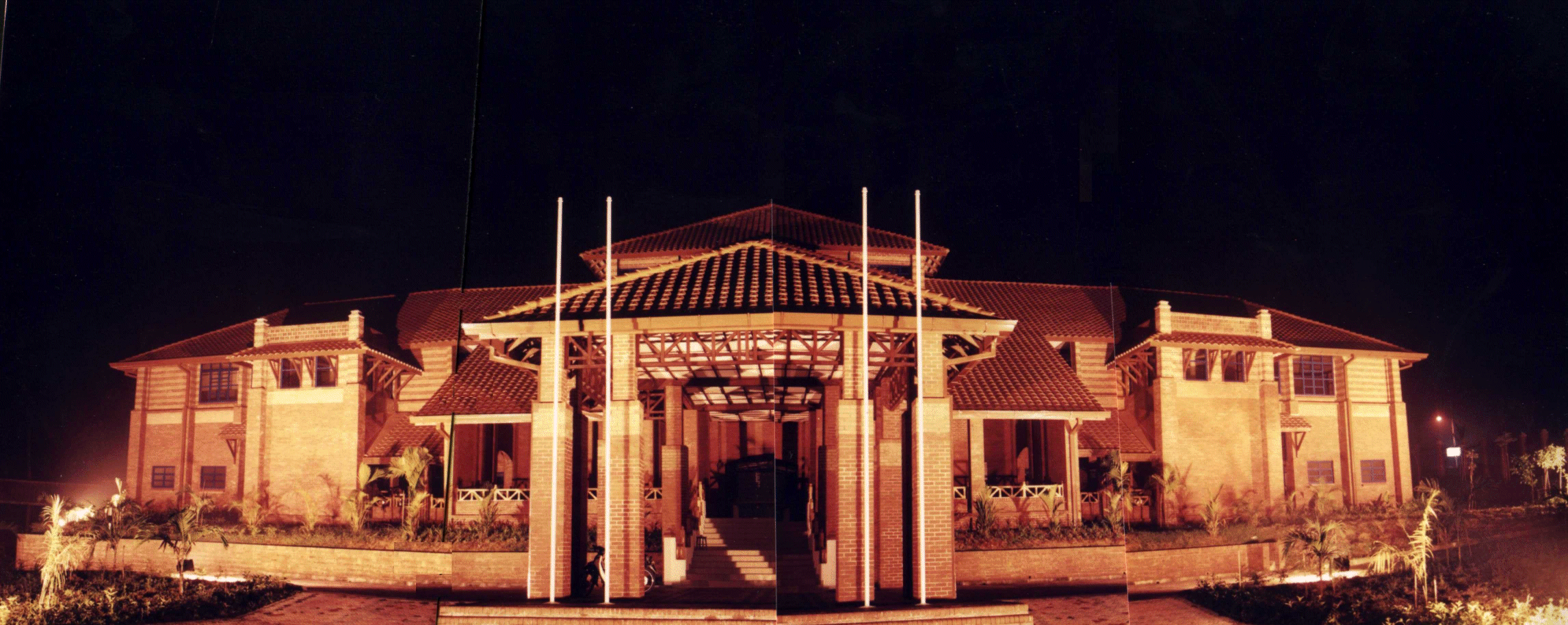
Kulai District Council

Kulai is a town and the capital of Kulai District, Johor, Malaysia. It is administered by the Kulai Municipal Council (MPKu), which covers an administrative planning area of 747.00 square kilometres (74,700 ha; 288.42 sq mi) and had an estimated population of 352,290 across 26 planning action zones in 2023.

== Etymology ==
According to local history, the name "Kulai" originated from the Chinese name Gui Lai (龟来), which translates to "the coming of tortoises". During rainy seasons, the overflowing banks of the Kulai River frequently caused flooding, driving dozens of tortoises onto the riverbanks and into the town center. The Hainanese community referred to the settlement as Gui Lai, a name that was previously displayed in Chinese script at the local railway station signboards before being modified to the modern phonetic name "Kulai" due to the complexity of writing the original characters.

== History ==
Kulai Town (Bandar Kulai) in Kulai District

Kulai was wild jungle until Huang Guo Mao arrived in 1892, returning to China to recruit Chinese laborers to clear the land and establish the first settlement. In 1902, Tan Yoke Fong arrived from Southern China and pioneered the New Town (Xin Jie Chang), followed by Fu Wen Zhang from Malacca who developed 4,000 acres in the area. In 1937, two rows of double-storey brick shophouses were constructed by Fu Teck Hui and Fu Teck Nan. During World War II in 1941, retreating British forces burned down the shophouses before incoming Japanese troops bombed and destroyed the remaining town center, which was rebuilt with two-storey wooden shophouses following the Japanese surrender.

The Kulai Local Council was established in 1950 before being dissolved during the Indonesia–Malaysia confrontation in 1961. On 1 January 1976, the Kulai District Council (MDK) was formed through the amalgamation of nine local councils: Kulai, Senai, Kelapa Sawit, Seelong, Saleng, Sengkang, Ayer Bemban, Sedenak, and Bukit Batu. The local authority was elevated to municipal status as Kulai Municipal Council (MPKu) on 21 April 2004.

Kulai was surveyed as one of the happiest cities in Malaysia in June 2020.

== Politics ==
The Kulai Local Council was formed in 1950. The Labour Party of Malaya won in the city during the 1950s and 1960s.

In 1947, there was a dispute between the pro-Kuomintang forces led by Tang Zhu Bo and the pro-Chinese Communist Party forces led by Chen Xiu Ying. Chen and his supporters went into the forest to fight a guerrilla campaign. Chen led around 100 men to attack Kulai in 1948, and killed Tan Go Kim, chair of the Kuomintang Kulai. Chen was killed in 1951.

== Geography and Land Use ==
The total planning area under MPKu encompasses 74,700.00 hectares (99.10% of Kulai District and 0.90% within neighboring Johor Bahru District border adjustments). As of 2023, undeveloped land accounted for 82.62% (61,793.03 hectares) of the municipality, dominated by agriculture (66.13% or 49,400.87 hectares) and gazetted forest reserves (8.85% or 6,610.38 hectares) covering Gunung Pulai, Sedenak, and Bukit Hantu. Built-up areas spanned 17.38% (12,976.97 hectares), comprising transportation infrastructure (7.22%), residential use (3.31%), industrial land (2.99%), and commercial developments (1.09%).

Topographically, 95.09% of the area consists of lowlands below 150 meters elevation, while hilly and mountainous terrain reaches its highest point at Mount Pulai (654 meters). The municipality is drained by seven primary river basins: Sungai Skudai, Sungai Pontian Besar, Sungai Sayong, Sungai Tebrau, Sungai Sanglang, Sungai Pulai, and Sungai Ayer Baloi.

== Demographics ==
According to the 2020 national census by the Department of Statistics Malaysia, the population of Kulai District was 329,497 people. Under the municipal administrative boundaries of the Kulai Municipal Council (incorporating Maju Jaya and excluding non-MPKu administrative tracts), the planning population reached 352,290 residents across 89,241 housing units in 2023, with an average household size of 3.95 persons.

Population Distribution by Planning Zone (2023)
| Planning Zone (Action Zone) | Total Housing Units | Total Population | Average Household Size |
|---|---|---|---|
| Bandar Kulai (Town Centre) | 25,331 | 101,152 | 3.99 |
| Bandar Putra Kulai | 14,123 | 62,935 | 4.46 |
| Bandar Senai | 15,397 | 59,310 | 3.85 |
| Saleng | 8,792 | 33,867 | 3.85 |
| Bandar Indahpura | 4,827 | 19,594 | 4.06 |
| Kelapa Sawit | 5,730 | 18,352 | 3.20 |
| Senai Airport & Industrial Zone | 3,181 | 13,950 | 4.39 |
| Bukit Batu | 3,039 | 11,003 | 3.62 |
| FELDA Taib Andak – Inas | 1,959 | 7,093 | 3.62 |
| Maju Jaya (Mukim Tebrau) | 840 | 3,684 | 4.39 |
| Sedenak | 1,129 | 3,616 | 3.20 |
| Seelong | 726 | 3,184 | 4.39 |
| Others / Rural / Estates / Forest Reserves | 4,167 | 14,550 | 3.49 |
| Total (MPKu Jurisdiction) | 89,241 | 352,290 | 3.95 |

== Economy ==
The Colonial Development Corporation conducted the Kulai Oil Palm Estate (KOPE), a 1,772 acre plantation that was abandoned by its Chinese owner during World War II, in 1950. The CDC initially sought 10,000 acres, but the low cost and the large amount of elaeis made KOPE desirable. In 1954, KOPE had 1,283 acres in production that produced 650 tonnes of oil and 3,083 acres were planned for the future. A palm oil factory for KOPE was completed in 1957. A 5,000 acre extension was launched in 1962. There were 26,000 acres dedicated to oil palm in Kulai by 1965.

In the 21st century, Kulai evolved into an industrial, digital, and commercial hub under the Iskandar Malaysia development corridor (Flagship E: Senai–Skudai and Flagship F: Sedenak). Key economic growth drivers include the Senai Airport City (SAC), the Senai Airport Aviation Park, and the Ibrahim Technopolis (iBTEC) hub housing the Sedenak Tech Park (STeP) and the YTL Green Data Center Park. The retail sector is anchored by commercial hubs such as Johor Premium Outlets (JPO) in Bandar Indahpura and IOI Mall Kulai in Bandar Putra.

== Culture ==
Foon Yew High School - Kulai

The Chinese community in Kulai mainly communicate in Hakka Chinese dialects. There are quite a number of Chinese temples to fulfill the religious needs of the local Chinese community, like Wan Xian Miao Temple (古来萬仙廟) (founded in 1913), Hong Sen Tai Tee Old Temple (古来新港洪仙大帝古廟) (founded in 1891), Yuen Sun Kung Temple (古来云山宫) (founded in 1933) and several other temples (such as the Hwa Kuo Shan Temple at Sedenak).

== Transportation ==
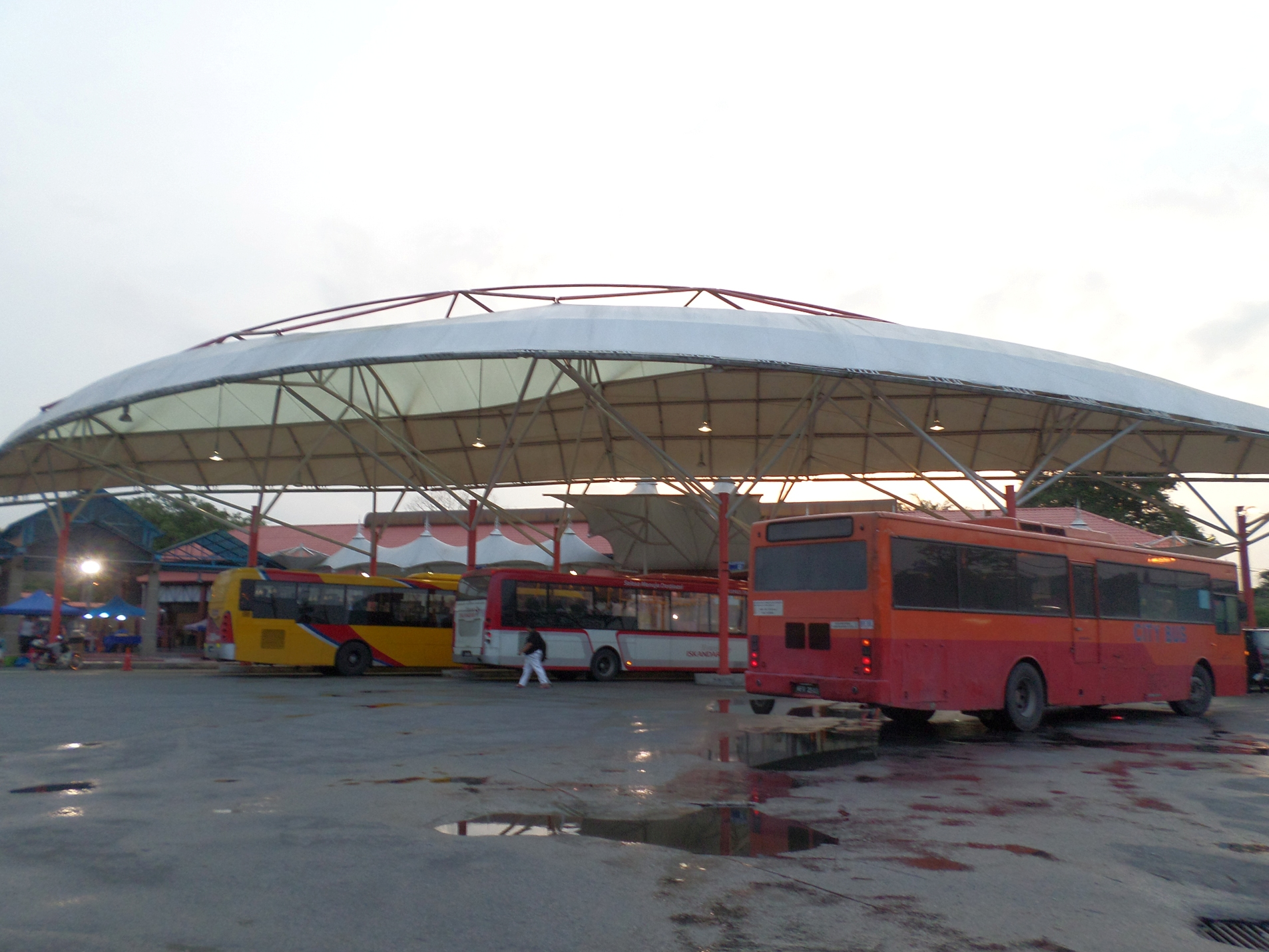
Kulai Bus Terminal

Transportation between Johor Bahru and Kulai was conducted through a bus service until 1933. There was one taxi in Kulai in 1936.

Modern Kulai functions as a major regional multi-modal transport hub for southern Johor. It is served by the North–South Expressway (E2) and Federal Route 1 (FT1). Rail connectivity is provided by Keretapi Tanah Melayu (KTM) at the Kulai railway station, serving intercity and electrified double-track train services. Air transportation for the region is anchored by the Senai International Airport (LTAS), located in the southern part of the municipality.

== Climate ==
Kulai has a tropical rainforest climate (Af) with heavy rainfall year-round.

Climate data for Kulai
| Month | Jan | Feb | Mar | Apr | May | Jun | Jul | Aug | Sep | Oct | Nov | Dec | Year |
|---|---|---|---|---|---|---|---|---|---|---|---|---|---|
| Mean daily maximum °C (°F) | 31.1 (88.0) | 31.5 (88.7) | 31.8 (89.2) | 31.8 (89.2) | 31.8 (89.2) | 31.9 (89.4) | 31.6 (88.9) | 31.6 (88.9) | 31.5 (88.7) | 31.4 (88.5) | 31.3 (88.3) | 31.1 (88.0) | 31.5 (88.8) |
| Daily mean °C (°F) | 26.3 (79.3) | 26.8 (80.2) | 27.1 (80.8) | 27.1 (80.8) | 27.1 (80.8) | 27.2 (81.0) | 26.9 (80.4) | 26.9 (80.4) | 26.8 (80.2) | 26.7 (80.1) | 26.7 (80.1) | 26.6 (79.9) | 26.9 (80.3) |
| Mean daily minimum °C (°F) | 21.6 (70.9) | 22.1 (71.8) | 22.4 (72.3) | 22.5 (72.5) | 22.5 (72.5) | 22.5 (72.5) | 22.3 (72.1) | 22.3 (72.1) | 22.2 (72.0) | 22.1 (71.8) | 22.2 (72.0) | 22.1 (71.8) | 22.2 (72.0) |
| Average rainfall mm (inches) | 252 (9.9) | 189 (7.4) | 246 (9.7) | 260 (10.2) | 241 (9.5) | 170 (6.7) | 173 (6.8) | 228 (9.0) | 218 (8.6) | 246 (9.7) | 273 (10.7) | 289 (11.4) | 2,785 (109.6) |
Source: Climate-Data.org

== Notable residents ==
- Mawi – Winner of the 2005 Akademi Fantasia singing competition and popular singer from FELDA Taib Andak
- Penny Tai – Winner of Best Composer (爱疯了) at Taiwanese Golden Melody Awards 2006 (金曲奖).
- Firdhaus Farmizi – Singer-songwriter

== Works cited ==
=== Books ===
- Robins, Jonathan (2021). Oil Palm: A Global History. University of North Carolina Press. ISBN 9781469662893. JSTOR 10.5149/9781469662916_robins.

=== Journals ===
- Jackson, J. (1967). "Oil Palm: Malaya's Post-Independence Boom Crop". Geography. 52 (3). Taylor & Francis: 319–321. JSTOR 40566331.

=== Web ===
- "Komunis Di Kulai". Kulai. 1998. Archived from the original on 16 February 2005.
- "Pengangkutan Di Kulai Sebelum Berperang". Kulai. 1998. Archived from the original on 16 February 2005.
- "Peristiwa Kebakaran Di Kulai". Kulai. 1998. Archived from the original on 27 September 2007.
- "Pilihanraya Tempatan Di Kulai". Kulai. 1998. Archived from the original on 16 February 2005.
