= Flag and coat of arms of Johor =

Symbols of the Malaysian state

The flag and coat of arms of Johor are the official state symbols of Johor, which has been a state of Malaysia since 1963. As with other Malaysian states with Malay royalty, Johor's symbols reflect the influence of its royal institution, as well as elements of Islam and the state's political and natural heritage. Many of these symbols, including the present flag and coat of arms, predate modern Malaysia. They were already in use when Johor functioned as a more sovereign kingdom, and continued after the state came under the indirect control of the United Kingdom in 1885 and later a part of the British Unfederated Malay States.

== Flag ==
Johor
- Use: Civil and state flag
- Proportion: 1:2
- Adopted: 1871
- Design: Navy blue with a bright red canton in the upper hoist, containing a white crescent and five-pointed star

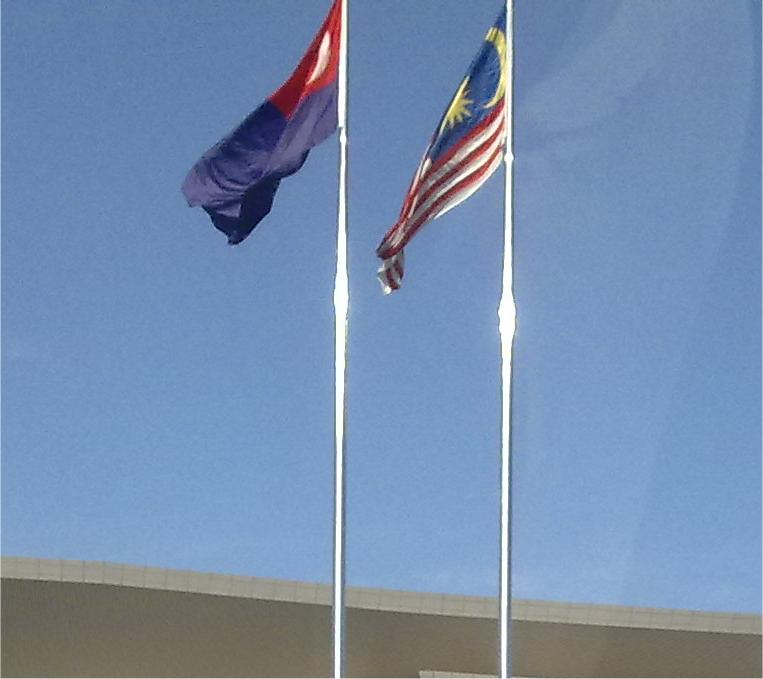
The flag, flown alongside the federal flag in front of the Sultan Iskandar Building in Johor Bahru.

=== Design ===
Johor's state flag bears a canton pattern, a predominantly navy blue design with a bright red canton in the upper hoist, which contains a white star and crescent. Running slightly less than half the length of the flag, the canton unconventionally occupies roughly three fifths of the flag's hoist. In addition, the crescent is not aligned upright, tilting downward towards the lower fly end and wrapping slightly around the star, which is positioned towards the lower corner of the canton, away from the hoist.

The flag in general attempts to symbolise Johor as a whole. The navy blue, which occupies roughly three quarters of the flag, represents the universe, or the state government. The red represents the warriors that defend the state, while the white crescent and white star denote Islam and Johor's sovereign ruler, respectively.

=== Variants ===
The vast majority of flags in use or formerly used by officials and government branches in the state borrow elements of the state flag, some of which are merely recolours. With the introduction of a unified state flag, many of them became obsolete, with the exception of the Royal Standards.

==== Standards ====
A series of Royal Standards are flown by the Sultan of Johor and his family, which lower-ranking members are assigned specific Standards. In addition, standards were also adopted for traditional high-ranking officials, including the bendahara, the Temenggung and the Sultan's Marshall.

The Standards are typically plain flags with a star (of varying numbers of points) and crescent, with truncating triangles placed on each corner of the flag; only the Standards of the Sultan and the Crown Prince are depicted without the truncations. In addition, each flag, with the exception of the Sultan's Enquerries, are coloured in only two colours, including white, blue, red and yellow. The number of points on the star also determines the rank of the Standard holder: The Sultan's Standard depicts a nine-pointed star, while the Standard for other members of the royal family depicts a five-pointed star.

The series of Standards include:

- the Standard of the Sultan: (Bendera Duli Yang Maha Mulia Baginda Sultan) A white flag with a blue nine-pointed star and crescent;
- the Standard of the Permaisuri: (Bendera Duli Yang Maha Mulia Baginda Permaisuri) A blue flag with a white seven-pointed star and crescent and four white triangles on each corner;
- the Standard of the Crown Prince: (Bendera Duli Yang Amat Mulia Tunku Mahkota) A white flag with a red seven-pointed star and crescent;
- the Standard of the Crown Prince's Consort: (Bendera Yang Amat Mulia Suri Waris) A red flag with a white five-pointed star and crescent and four white triangles on each corner;
- the Standard of the Raja Muda: (Bendera Duli Yang Amat Mulia Raja Muda) A white flag with a blue seven-pointed star and crescent and four blue triangles on each corner;
- the Standard of the Regent: (Bendera Pemangku Sultan) A yellow-blue per bend divided flag with a red five-pointed star and crescent in the centre;
- the Standard of the Tun: (Bendera Yang Amat Mulia Tunku Tun) A white flag with a yellow five-pointed star and crescent and four yellow triangles on each corner;
- the Standard of the Bendahara: (Bendera Yang Amat Mulia Tunku Bendahara) A white flag with a red five-pointed star and crescent and four red triangles on each corner;
- the Standard of the Temenggong: (Bendera Yang Amat Mulia Tunku Temenggong) Yellow flag with blue five-pointed star and crescent and four blue triangles on each corner;
- the Standard of the Laksamana: (Bendera Yang Amat Mulia Tunku Laksamana) Blue flag with yellow five-pointed star and crescent and four yellow triangles on each corner;
- the Standard of the Panglima: (Bendera Yang Amat Mulia Tunku Panglima) Blue flag with red five-pointed star and crescent and four red triangles on each corner;
- the Standard of the Putera: (Bendera Yang Amat Mulia Tunku Putera) Red flag with blue five-pointed star and crescent and four blue triangles on each corner;
- the Standard of the Sultan's Equerries: (Bendera Pengiring Raja) Black field with red canton containing a five-pointed white star and crescent, similar to the civil flag and ensign, but features a swallowtail that extends close to canton; and
- the Standard for other members of the royal family: (Bendera Kerabat Diraja) A yellow flag with a blue five-pointed star and crescent.
Standard of the Sultan

Standard of the Permaisuri

Standard of the Tunku Mahkota

Standard of the Tunku Mahkota's Consort

Standard of the Raja Muda

Standard of the Regent

Standard of the Tunku Tun

Standard of the Tunku Bendahara

Standard of the Tunku Temenggong

Standard of the Tunku Laksamana

Standard of the Tunku Panglima

Standard of the Tunku Putera

Standard of the Sultan's Equerries

Standard of the Royal Family

==== Governmental flags ====
As of 1939, flags were flown by numerous state officials in Johor, including the governing heads of state or district. The vast majority of flag consist of only a plain coloured flag with a five-pointed star and crescent similar to that from the state flag, with some divided diagonally a la party per bend. They include:

- the flag of the Chief Minister of Johor: (Bendera Menteri Besar) A blue flag with a white five-pointed star and crescent in the centre;
- the Military flag: (Bendera Askar) A blue flag with yellow canton containing a red five-pointed star and crescent, and a white crossed kris and sword on the lower fly;
- the Commercial flag: (Bendera Perniagaan) A black flag with a red canton containing a white five-pointed star and crescent;
- the Marine flag: (Bendera Jabatan Laut) A white flag with blue canton containing a red five-pointed star and crescent;
- the Police flag: (Bendera Polis) A red flag with black canton containing a white five-pointed star and crescent;
- the State Ceremonial Flag: (Bendera Istiadat Kerajaan) A red flag with a white five-pointed star and crescent, and a yellow and blue bordure.
- the Marine Jack (Bendera Tetunggal Jabatan Laut) A blue flag with a red five-pointed star and crescent, and a white bordure.
- the Territorial Government Boat Ensign (Bendera Tetunggal Kapal Kerajaan) A black flag with red canton containing a white five-pointed star and crescent, and a red lozenge containing a white five-pointed star and crescent on the lower fly;
- the Government Official Pennant (Bendera Pegawai Kerajaan) A blue pennant containing a white five-pointed star and crescent;
- the flag of the State Commissioner for Muar: (Bendera Pesuruhjaya Kerajaan bagi Muar) An orthogonally quartered flag with the first quarter coloured red with a white five-pointed star and crescent, the second and third quarters coloured black, and the fourth quarter coloured yellow with a red five-pointed star and crescent; formerly Flag of the State Commissioner for Muar (Malay: Bendera Orang Besar Daerah Muar); now has been re-introduced back as Muar Flag by the Muar District Office.
- the flag of the State Commissioner for Batu Pahat: (Bendera Pesuruhjaya Kerajaan bagi Batu Pahat) A red-black per bend divided flag with a white five-pointed star and crescent in the centre; and
- the flag of the State Commissioner for Segamat: (Bendera Pesuruhjaya Kerajaan bagi Segamat) A red-white per bend divided flag with a yellow five-pointed star and crescent in the centre.
Flag of the Chief Minister

Military flag

Commercial flag

Marine flag

Police flag

State ceremonial flag

Marine jack

Territorial government boat ensign

Government official pennant

Flag of the State Commissioner of Muar

Flag of the State Commissioner of Batu Pahat

Flag of the State Commissioner of Segamat

In addition, pennants were known to be flown, illustrated as a triangular flag containing the same five pointed star and crescent. The "State Officials' Pennant" was coloured blue with a white star and crescent, while another variant of unknown use was coloured yellow with a blue star and crescent.

==== District flags ====
Johor has ten administrative districts (daerah), each assigned their own district-level flags. They were introduced on 3 March 2015.

District	Flag	Banner	Field colour	Symbolisation
Johor Bahru			Red; White; Blue	A red-blue per bend divided flag with a white five-pointed star and crescent in the centre.
Kulai			Red; White; Blue	An orthogonally quartered flag with the first and fourth quarters coloured red, and the second and third quarters coloured blue with white five-pointed star and crescent in the centre.
Pontian			Red; White; Blue	A red-blue horizontally divided flag with a white five-pointed star and crescent in the centre.
Batu Pahat			Red; White; Black	A red-black per bend divided flag with a white five-pointed star and crescent in the centre.
Muar			Red; White; Black; Yellow	An orthogonally quartered flag with the first quarter coloured red with a white five-pointed star and crescent, the second and third quarters coloured black, and the fourth quarter coloured yellow with a red five-pointed star and crescent.
Tangkak			Red; White; Blue	A blue triangle on a red field flag with a white five-pointed star and crescent in the centre. The triangle symbolise Mount Ledang, a highest mountain in Johor.
Segamat			Red; White; Yellow	A red-white per bend divided flag with a yellow five-pointed star and crescent in the centre.
Kluang			Red; White; Blue	A blue field with a red diagonal band from the lower hoist side to the upper fly side with a white five-pointed star and crescent in the centre.
Mersing			Red; White; Blue	Two equal horizontal bands of white (top) and blue with a red isosceles triangle based on the hoist side with a white five-pointed star and crescent at the hoist. The white at an upper field symbolise South China Sea.
Kota Tinggi			Red; White; Blue	A diagonal tricolour of red, white and blue radiating from the lower hoist side corner with white five-pointed star and crescent at the upper hoist side. The white at a centre field symbolise Johor River where the old Sultanate of Johor was established here on 1528.

==== City flags ====
City	Flag	Field colour	Symbolisation
Johor Bahru City		Red; White; Blue	Three equal horizontal bands of red, white and blue, with a yellow crescent and star in the middle of the white band similar to flag of Labuan. The City Flag was adopted when Johor Bahru became a City on 1 January 1994. According to official sources of the city's local authority, the yellow crescent and star represents Islam as the city's official religion, red represents the city's prosperity and progress, blue represents the city council's role in servicing and developing the city and white represents harmony and unity of the city's populace.

=== Obsolete state flag ===
The Johorean flag is known to date back as early as the 1850s, when a flag that consisted of a simple black flag with a white canton shaped as a square was flown by the Sultanate between 1855 and 1865. The design was also adopted by Trumong, in present-day Indonesia.

Historical flags of Johor
Up to 1855

1855–65

1865–71

== Coat of arms ==
Coat of arms of Johor
- Armiger: Johor
- Adopted: 1892 (latest version)
- Crest: The Royal Crown of Johor proper
- Shield: Argent, a crescent and a mullet between four smaller mullets
- Supporters: Two tigers rampant proper
- Compartment: Mirrored flora Or
- Motto: کفد الله برسراه (Kepada Allah Berserah) 'To Allah We Surrender' or 'Unto God Resigned' in Jawi Script

Johor's coat of arms (Malay: Jata Johor) derives its layout heavily from Western heraldry, consisting of a central shield topped by a crown, sided by two supporters, and includes a compartment and motto at the bottom. Details of the arms' elements are:

Crown
The crown represents Johor's royalty, and is symbolised by a blue and yellow adorned with motives of a five-pointed star and a crescent.

Escutcheon
The arms' escutcheon consists of a white shield of an "English" outline with a central five-pointed star and crescent, and four smaller five-pointed stars at each corner of the shield; both the stars and the crescent are coloured in yellow. The larger star and crescent symbolise the Islamic faith, while the four stars represent the four original territories of modern Johor: Johor Bahru, Muar, Batu Pahat and Endau.

Supporters
The arms features two supporters depicted by rampant tigers, which represents the two Johor tigers, Dengkis and Tepuk, which according to folklore are the mystical guardians of Johor.

Compartment and motto
The area below the shield include of a group of yellow, mirrored flora (compartment) hanging a blue scroll (motto). The compartment represents gambir and black pepper, crops cultivated by Johor's traditional agricultural industry. The scroll, with text written in Jawi, reads Kepada Allah Berserah ('To Allah We Surrender' or 'Unto God Resigned').

There were two versions of Johor State Arms prior to the current one adopted in 1892. The first one adopted in 1858 consisted of the Royal Crown, an oval shield featuring a crescent and star and pepper and gambier branches. The second one adopted in 1888 feature three asterisks or Cloves (Bunga Cengkih) surrounding a crescent and star on a white shield.

=== City, district and municipal council emblems ===
All 16 local governments in Johor have their own emblem, which evolved in design throughout history. Each design may reflect a municipality's identities and or the roles and responsibilities of its local authority. Since 2018, two elements of the state coat of arms – the two rampant tigers and the royal crown of Johor have been incorporated by the state government, and become the common features of all the state's local government emblems to reflect the state's rapid economic development; although slightly differ in appearance. This results in emblems that look almost similar in style to the State Coat of Arms.

Emblem	Municipality	Local government	Other notable element(s)	Motto(s)
	Batu Pahat	Batu Pahat Municipal Council	Batu Pahat District Flag; Two sprigs of Black pepper and Gambir; Circuit lines; Rub el Hizb	Majlis Perbandaran Batu Pahat (Batu Pahat Municipal Council); Maju dan Sejahtera (Progress and Prosper)
	Iskandar Puteri	Iskandar Puteri City Council	Two Sprigs of Black pepper; Elephant Tusks; Bridge; Road markings; Johor state flag	Majlis Bandaraya Iskandar Puteri (Iskandar Puteri City Council)
	Johor Bahru	Johor Bahru City Council	Scroll; Sprigs of Black pepper and Gambir; Johor State Banner; Building; Gear or cogwheel	Berkhidmat, Berbudaya, Berwawasan (Service, Cultured, Visionary); Bandaraya Johor Bahru (City of Johor Bahru)
	Kluang	Kluang Municipal Council	Crescent and star; Train; Orange Jasmine; Floral compartments	Maju Sejahtera (Progress, Prosper); Majlis Perbandaran Kluang (Kluang Municipal Council)
	Kota Tinggi	Kota Tinggi District Council	Kota Tinggi District Flag; Beach Morning Glory; Kris; Embattlement; Kota Tinggi Bridge; Mountain; Rivers	1528 (Year of the Foundation of Johor Sultanate at Pekan Tua); Harmoni Berbudaya (Harmonious, Cultural); Majlis Daerah Kota Tinggi (Kota Tinggi District Council)
	Kulai	Kulai Municipal Council	Kulai District Flag; Gear or cogwheel; Circuit lines; Mount Pulai; Aeroplane (Senai International Airport)	2004 (Year of establishment of the Municipal Council); Majlis Perbandaran Kulai (Kulai Municipal Council)
	Labis	Labis District Council	Human Figure; Factory; Building; Gear or cogwheel; Sprigs of Black pepper	Majlis Daerah Labis (Labis District Council); Berkhidmat untuk Rakyat (Serve the People)
	Mersing	Mersing District Council	Anchor; Seahorses; Black pepper compartment	MDM (Acronym for Mersing District Council); Perkhidmatan Untuk Rakyat (Service for the People)
	Muar	Muar Municipal Council	Muar District Flag	Kepada Allah Berserah (State motto in Jawi script); Majlis Perbandaran Muar (Muar Municipal Council)
	Pasir Gudang	Pasir Gudang City Council	Circuit lines; Champak Flower; Gear or cogwheel; Crescent and star; City Council Headquarters and other buildings; Trees; Ship; Floral compartment	Majlis Bandaraya Pasir Gudang (Pasir Gudang City Council)
	Pengerang	Pengerang Municipal Council	Map of Pengerang with Kota Tinggi District Flag; Beach; Coconut trees; Sailboat; Buildings; Black pepper compartment	Majlis Perbandaran Pengerang (Pengerang Municipal Council)
	Pontian	Pontian Municipal Council	Pineapple; Factory and cogwheel; Fish; Bridge; Pontian District Flag; Black pepper compartment	1976 (Year of establishment of the District Council); Majlis Perbandaran Pontian (Pontian Municipal Council); Setia Khidmat (Faithfully We Serve)
	Segamat	Segamat Municipal Council	Segamat District Flag; Crescent and star; Black pepper compartment; Gear or cogwheel; Buildings; Human Figure; Leaves; Trees	Khidmat Untuk Rakyat (Serve the People); Majlis Perbandaran Segamat (Segamat Municipal Council)
	Simpang Renggam	Simpang Renggam District Council	Gear or cogwheel; Building; Hibiscus flower; Book; Leaves	Usaha Maju Jaya (Effort Progress Success); Majlis Daerah Simpang Renggam (Simpang Renggam District Council)
	Tangkak	Tangkak District Council	Tangkak District Flag; Mount Ledang	Berusaha Untuk Makmur (Strive To Prosper); Majlis Daerah Tangkak (Tangkak District Council)
	Yong Peng	Yong Peng District Council	Buildings; Trees	Majlis Daerah Yong Peng (Yong Peng District Council)
