= Bandar Putra Kulai =

Coordinates: 1°39′23.0″N 103°37′54.9″E

Bandar Putra Kulai 古来太子城
- Township
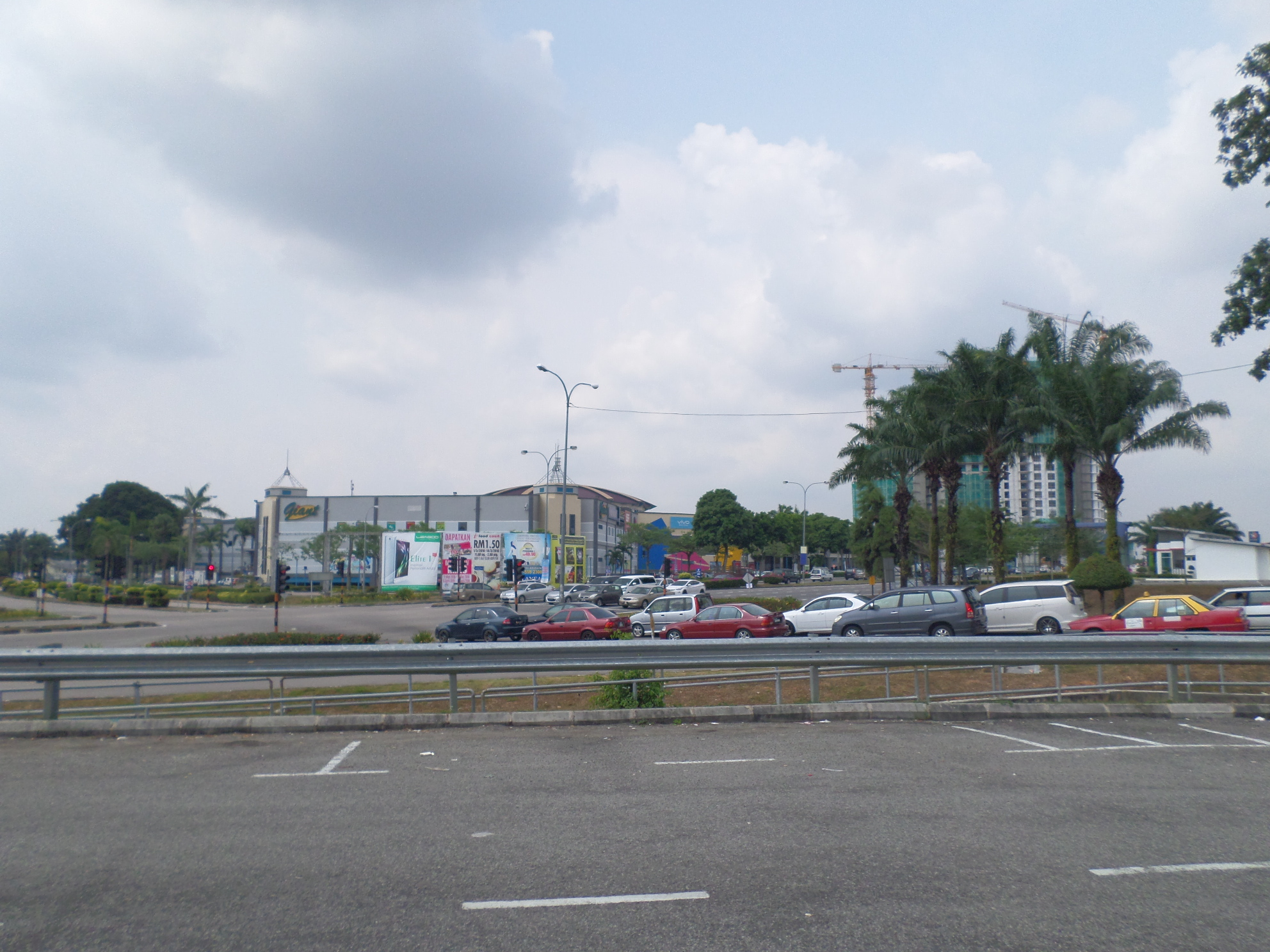
- Interactive map of Bandar Putra Kulai 古来太子城
- Country: Malaysia
- State: Johor
- District: Kulai

Bandar Putra Kulai is a medium-sized mixed-development township, built by IOI Group from 2001, in the Kulai District, Johor, Malaysia. The IOI Mall Kulai shopping complex is located here, as well as the Palm Villa Golf Resort, the Kulai fire brigade station and Hutan Bandar Putra park.

== Population ==
As of January 2016 the township has a population of 19,793, comprising about 8% of the wider Kulai District population. Although the population has grown fast and steadily since its start, the spacious design of the streets and the many smaller parks, playgrounds and water bodies within the township contribute to a low population density.

== Location ==
Bandar Putra is located between the Kulai trunkroad, opposite the Genting Group's township of Indahpura to the west, the IOI oil palm lands to the north, Senai Airport to the east and the township of Saleng to the south. Bandar Kulai is situated some 2 km north up the trunk road while Senai town is some 4 km south up the trunk road.

The river Sungai Skudai as well as the Bangkok-Kuala Lumpur-Singapore railway run alongside Bandar Putra township, with the nearest train station being Kulai town. Though train services have stopped operating from Johor Bahru to Singapore vv, the trains to and from Kulai stop / depart at Johor Bahru, where a shuttle train is available to continue into Singapore.
