= Kelapa =

Kelapa may refer to the following places:

- Kelapa Dua, district in the Tangerang Regency of Banten in Java, Indonesia
- Kelapa Gading, subdistrict of North Jakarta, Jakarta, Indonesia
- Kelapa Sawit, town in Kulai District, Johor, Malaysia
