= Sedenak railway station =

Malaysian train station

Sedenak

General information
- Location: Sedenak, Johor, Malaysia
- Owner: Keretapi Tanah Melayu
- Line: West Coast Line
- Platforms: 1 side platform
- Tracks: 2

Construction
- Parking: No
- Accessible: Y

Other information
- Status: Demolished

History
- Opened: 1800s
- Closed: 2009

Former services
Preceding station	Keretapi Tanah Melayu	Following station
Layang-Layang towards Padang Besar	West Coast Line	Kulai towards Woodlands

The Sedenak railway station was a Malaysian train station located at and named after the town of Sedenak, Johor, opened in the 19th century and was closed in 2009. The station was demolished due to the construction of the future Gemas–Johor Bahru double tracking project.
