= Putuo Village =

Buddhist temple in Johor, Malaysia

- Malay: Perkampungan Putuo; Chinese: 普陀村

Religion
- Affiliation: Buddhism
- Status: Active

Location
- Location: FELDA Taib Andak
- Municipality: Kulai
- State: Johor
- Country: Malaysia
- Interactive map of Putuo Village
- Coordinates: 1.72504°N 103.62561°E

Website
- putuovillage.com.my

Putuo Village (Chinese: 普陀村; pinyin: Pǔtuó cūn) is a Buddhist temple in Kulai District, in the Malaysian state of Johor. Located at FELDA Taib Andak, the temple is known for its bamboo architecture and a 21-acre bamboo forest.

== History ==
Putuo Village started in around 2005 as a small Buddhist temple dedicated to Guanyin Bodhisattva. The temple gradually fell into disrepair over the years, with serious weathering and leaking problems. This, alongside its growing popularity, had prompted the temple's management to begin the repairments and expansions of the temple around 2015. The temple buildings was overhaled with bamboo materials taken from its own bamboo forest plantation.

In 2016, the temple had installed a 23-foot indoor Cundi Bodhisattva statue, which is the tallest of its kind in Southeast Asia. The statue was funded through community and governmental support.

In 2024, Putuo Village had begun building a Guanyin Hall constructed entirely out of bamboo, which is the first in Malaysia.

== Description ==
=== Bodhi Harbour ===
Bodhi Harbour (Chinese: 菩提港; pinyin: Pútí gǎng) is the centrepiece of Putuo Village, housing the iconic Cundi Bodhisattva statue. The site serves as a focal point for Buddhist rituals and meditation, attracting devotees and tourists alike. Practices such as turning prayer wheels and participating in blessing ceremonies are key cultural elements offered at the harbor.

=== Purple Bamboo Valley ===
Purple Bamboo Valley (Chinese: 紫竹谷; pinyin: Zǐzhú gǔ) is Malaysia's largest bamboo forest. It offers scenic pathways, hanging installations, and bamboo-themed dining experiences. The valley has become a popular spot for photography and family outings.

=== Chinese zodiac sculptures ===
==== Bamboo Dragon ====
A 12-metre-long bamboo dragon sculpture, weighing 200 kilograms, was unveiled in conjunction of the Chinese zodiac year of the dragon. Handcrafted by an Indonesian artist for over six months, the dragon is suspended by steel wires mid-air.

==== Golden Snake ====
In 2025, a 10.5-metre-high snake sculpture was unveiled for the Chinese zodiac year of the snake. The snake was sculpted in half a year and was integrated with 8,888 pieces of golden scales.

== Cultural and community impact ==
Putuo Village plays a significant role in promoting Buddhist culture and eco-tourism in Johor. Events such as Avalokitesvara Day and Chinese New Year celebrations draw large crowds, with visitor numbers often exceeding 12,000 per day during peak seasons. These activities boost the local economy by creating job opportunities and increasing tourism revenue.

Additionally, the temple contributes to scientific research and sustainability through initiatives such as the cultivation of Dendrocalamus asper bamboo for use in the pulp and paper industry.
