= Bukit Batu =

Coordinates: 1°43′N 103°26′E

- Mukim
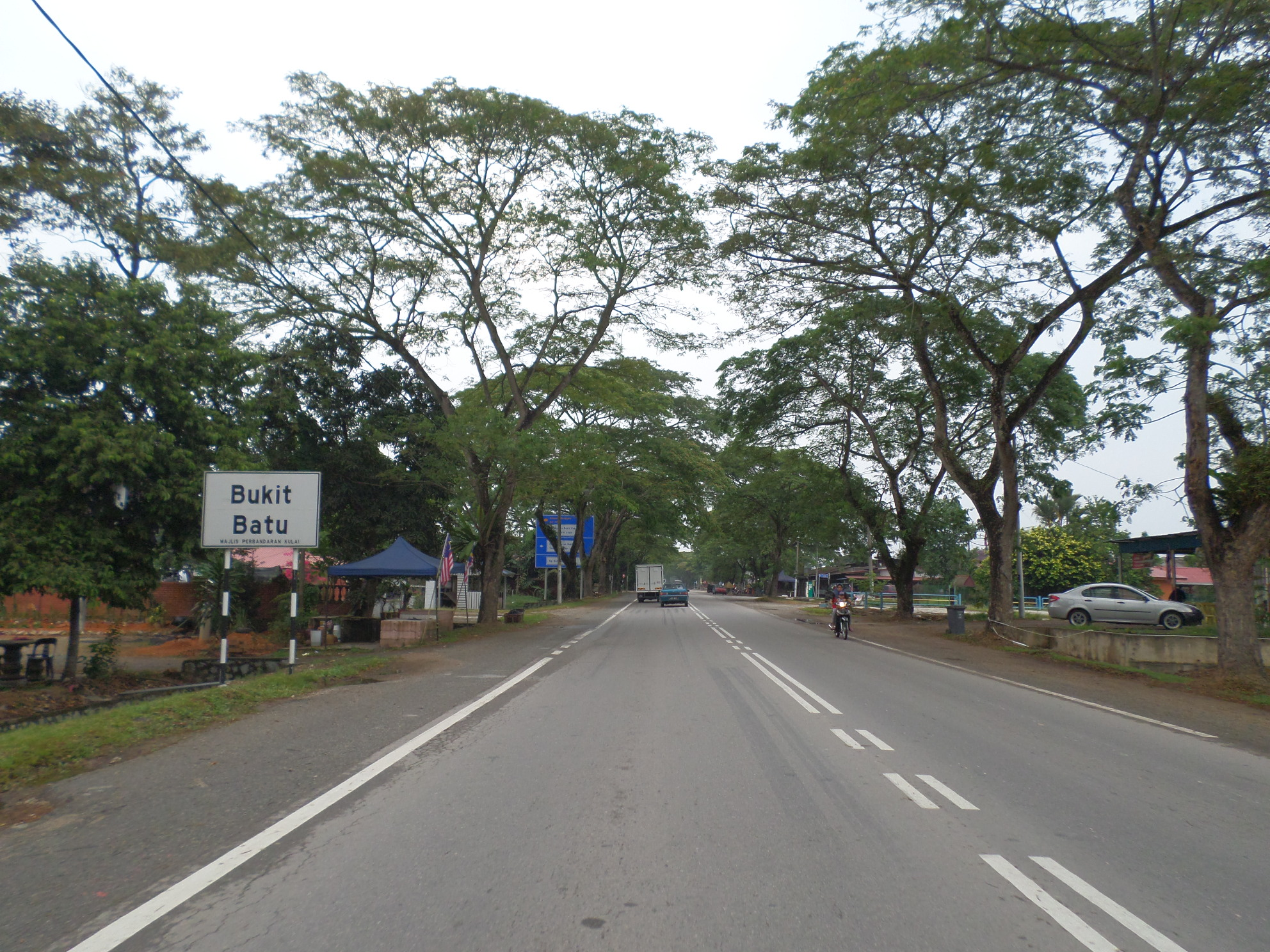
- Interactive map of Bukit Batu
- Country: Malaysia
- State: Johor
- District: Kulai

Area
  - Total: 86 km^{2} (33 sq mi)

Population
  - Total: 15 549
  - Density: 0.17/km^{2} (0.45/sq mi)

Bukit Batu is a mukim (subdivision) in Kulai District, Johor, Malaysia. Bukit Batu means "Hill of Rock" in Malay. Kulai Municipal Council administer the town.

== History ==
The village's legend, about hundred years ago, the tiger Kalimantan conquered and chaos this area, and Chong successfully lead a group of villagers to stop and kill the tiger. During WW2, the Japanese conquered this village; with the help of Chong, the villagers survived and successfully stopped the Japanese coming into the village.

== Geography ==
Bukit Batu in Kulai District

The mukim spans over an area of 86 km^{2}.

== Demographics ==
A mainly Hakka community, the majority of the villagers have the same surname, "Chong". The mukim has 14,147 people.

== Economy ==
Most villagers are oil plantation owners, and most live in bungalows.

== Transportation ==
=== Road ===
The town is accessible by bus from Larkin Sentral (2, 888) in Johor Bahru.

== See also ==
- List of ultras of the Malay Archipelago
