= Johor Premium Outlets =

Outlet centre in Kulai, Johor, Malaysia

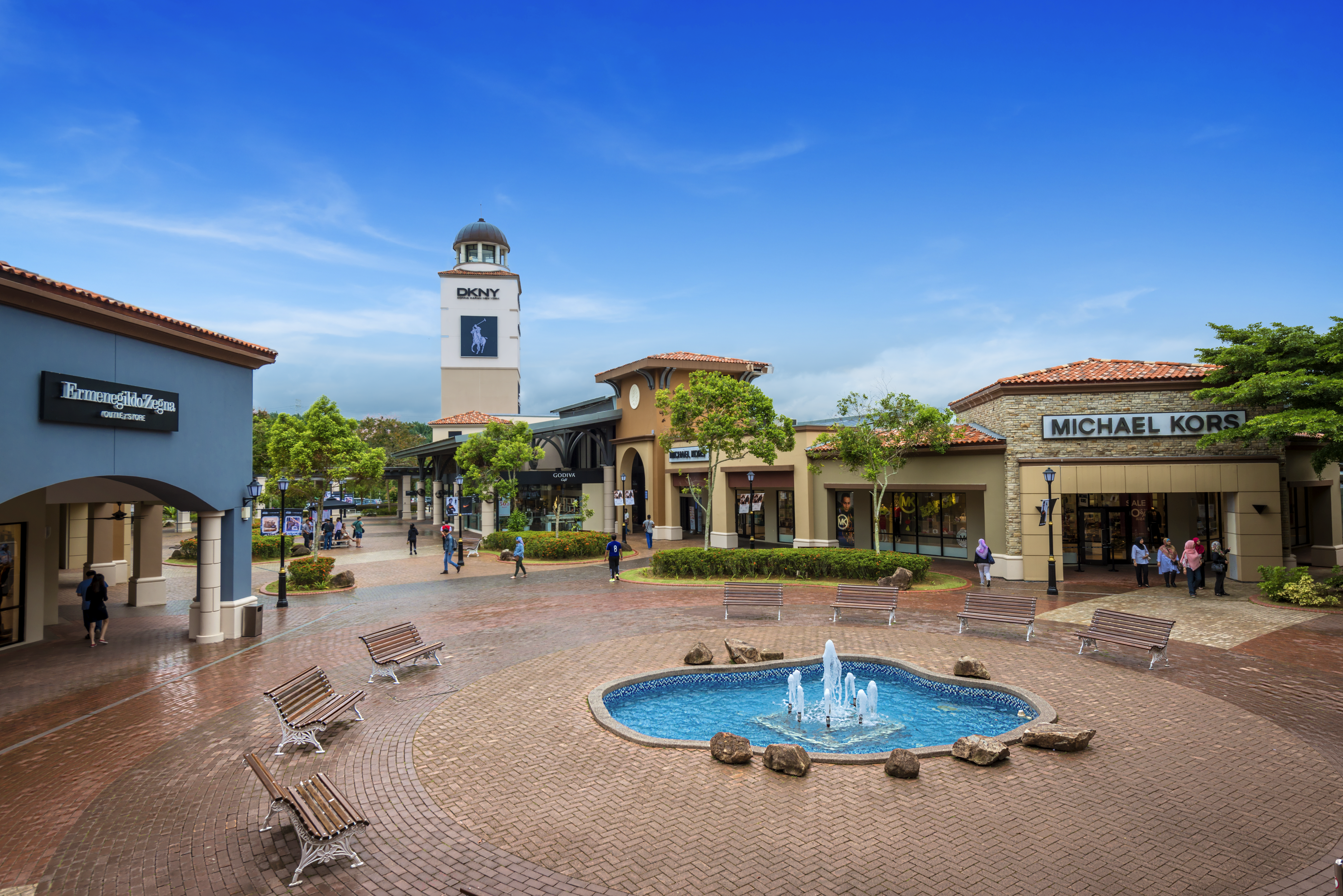
- Location: Indahpura, Kulai, Johor, Malaysia
- Coordinates: 1.6037851°N 103.6204982°E
- Opened: 11 December 2011; 14 years ago
- Developer: Genting Simon Group
- Manager: Simon Premium Outlets
- Owner: Genting Simon Sdn Bhd
- Num. of stores: 150
- Floors: 2
- Website: www.premiumoutlets.com.my/johor-premium-outlets

Johor Premium Outlets (JPO) is a luxury mall in Indahpura, Malaysia with 150 designer and name brand outlet stores as of 2021. The center is operated by Genting Simon Sdn Bhd and is part of the Genting Simon Group, which is a joint venture between Genting Plantations Berhad and Simon Property Group.

Phase I of Johor Premium Outlets was officially opened on 11 December 2011, with the center adding on 50 new stores during its Phase II expansion on 15 November 2013. Five years later, the center added another 20 new stores, bringing the total number to 150 through its Phase III expansion on 15 November 2018.

== History ==
The mall first opened in December 2011, as a joint venture between Genting Plantations and Simon Property Group, in Kulai, Johor. It was only the second outlet mall to open in Malaysia, after the Oriental Village in Langkawi, which had eventually closed down. The owner is the 50/50 joint venture Genting Simon Sdn Bhd. The Nikkei Asia newspaper said after the opening that "Johor mall targets visitors from Malaysia and neighboring Singapore with luxury brands such as Bally, Salvatore Ferragamo in Florence, Italy, Furla, Ermenegildo Zegna and Coach."

In November 2013, it completed JPO Phase II expansion. At the 2013 South-East Asia Property Awards, the development won Best Commercial Development (Malaysia) and Best Commercial Architectural Design (Malaysia). In June 2018, the mall had 130 "designers and brand name stores".

By 2019, it had 150 outlet stores, and stated it was attracting 4.5 million visitors annually. Phase three of the property opened in March 2019, with the official opening attended by Johor Sultan Ibrahim Ibni Almarhum Sultan Iskandar. Genting Group CEO Tan Sri Lim Kok Thay and Simon COO of development Mark Silvestri were also present, and Johor Mentri Besar Datuk Osman Sapian.

== Location ==
Near Senai International Airport, it is located three hours drive from Kuala Lumpur and one hour drive from downtown Singapore. In Kulai, it is at the intersection of the North-South Expressway and the Second Link Expressway. The location is on 18.2 hectares (45 acres) of land, with a built up 379,000 square feet (35,200 m^{2}).

== See also ==
- List of Simon Property Group properties
