= Ayer Bemban =

Coordinates: 1°42′N 103°29′E

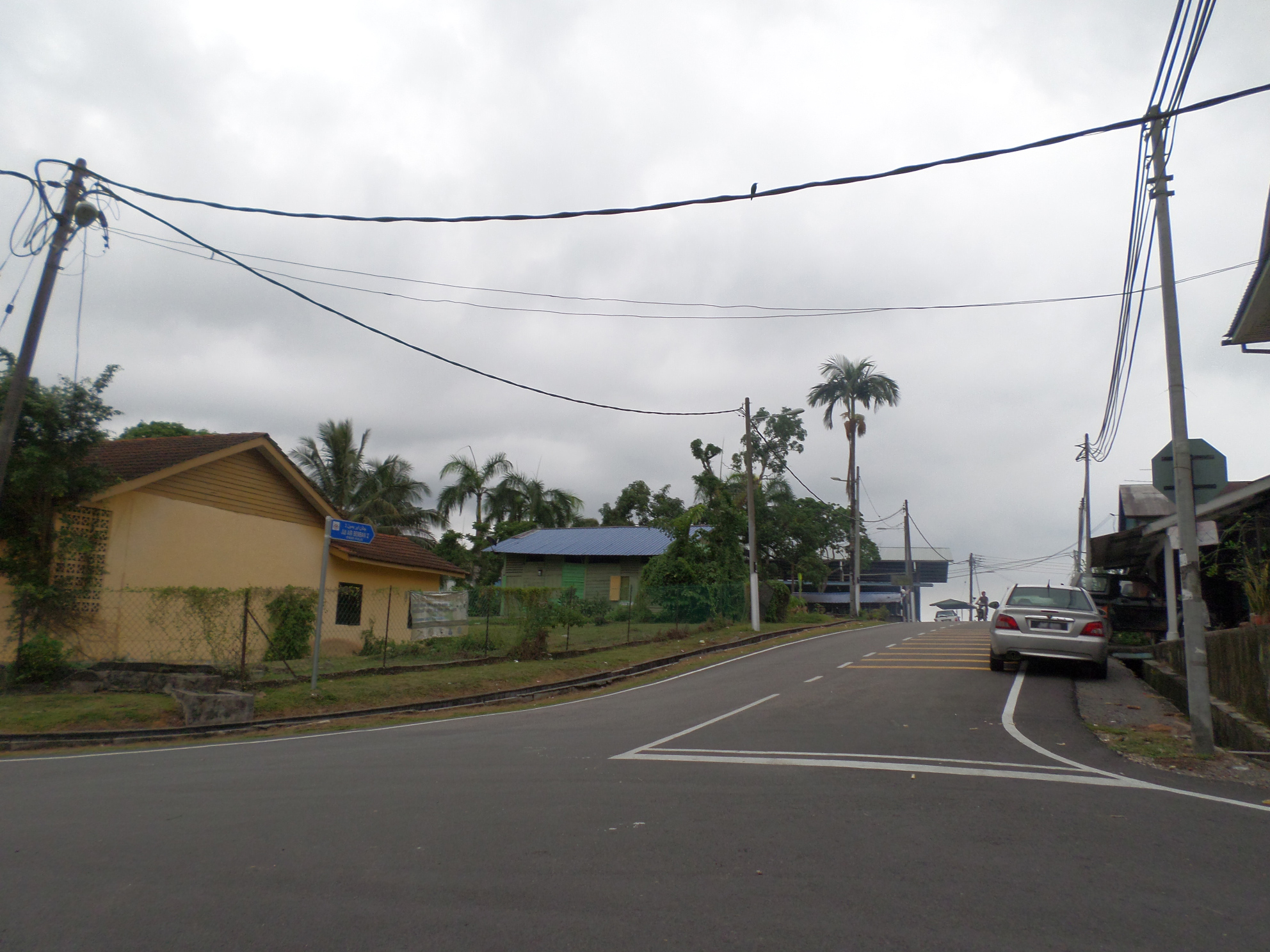
- Interactive map of Ayer Bemban
- Country: Malaysia
- State: Johor
- District: Kulai

Ayer Bemban (Currently also known as Air Bemban) is a small village in the north of Kulai District, Johor, Malaysia.

== Transportation ==
=== Road ===
The town is accessible by bus from Larkin Sentral (2, 888) in Johor Bahru.
