= Seelong =

- Town in Malaysia
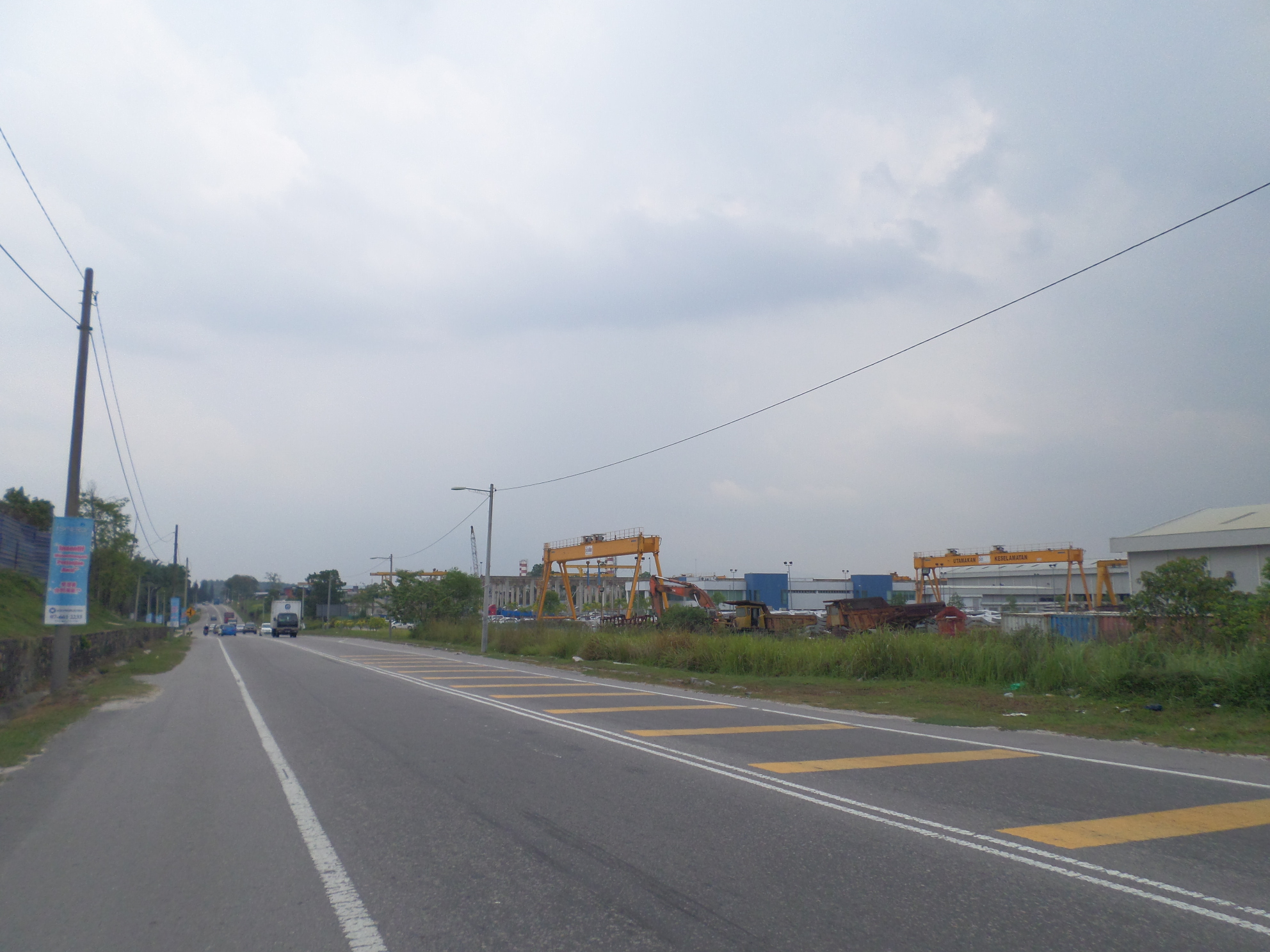
- Seelong

- Seelong in Johor, Malay Peninsular and Malaysia Seelong (Peninsular Malaysia) Seelong (Malaysia)
- Coordinates: 1°37′13″N 103°39′22″E
- Country: Malaysia
- State: Johor
- District: Kulai
- Time zone: UTC+8 (MYT)
- Postal code: 81400

Seelong is a small town in Kulai District, Johor, Malaysia. It is nearby the Senai International Airport and Senai Industrial Park.

== Transportation ==
The area is accessible by Muafakat Bus route P-402.
