= Kulai District =

District in Johor, Malaysia

- District of Johor
- Daerah Kulai
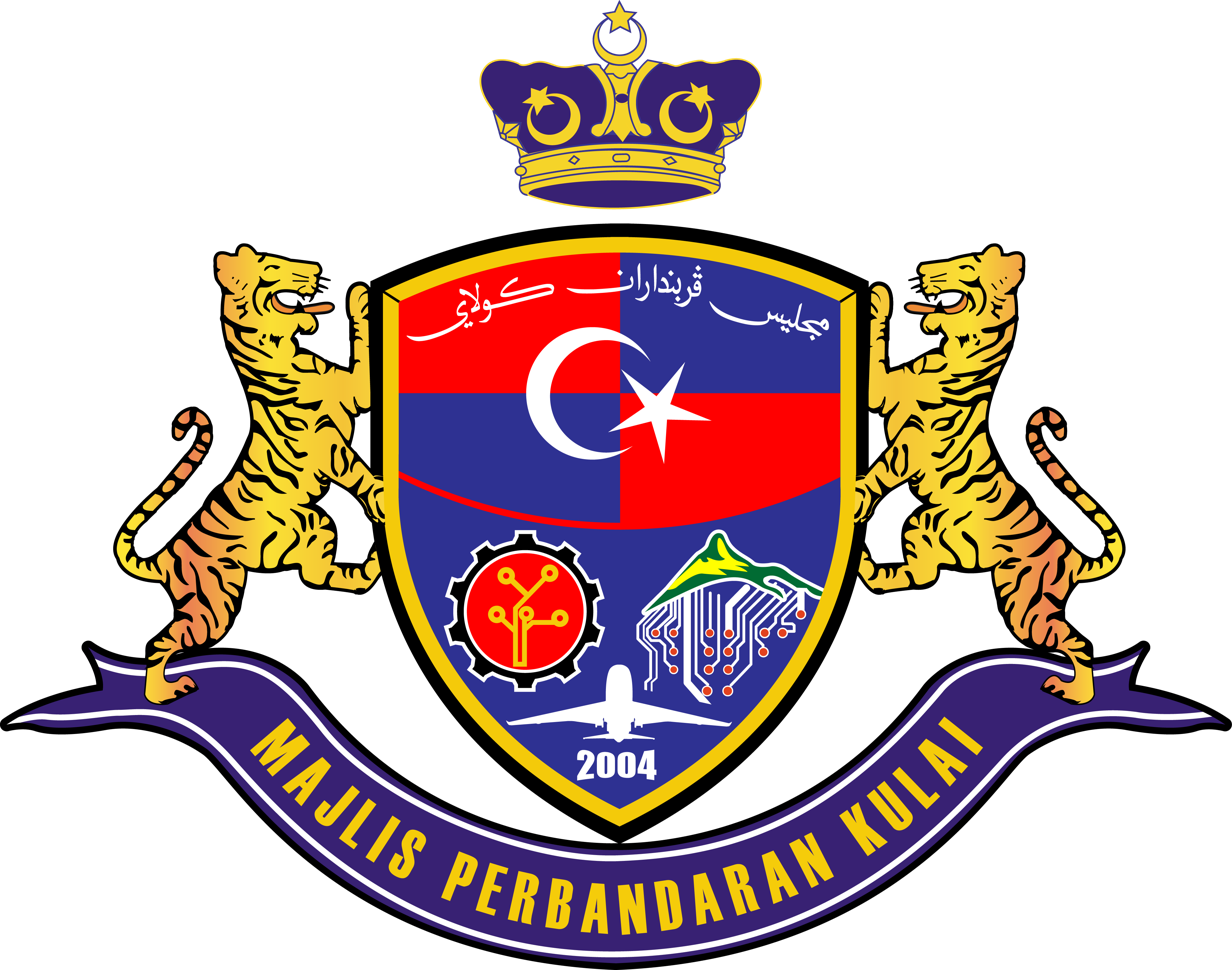
- Flag Seal
- Interactive map of Kulai District
- Location of Kulai District in Malaysia
- Coordinates: 1.6476098°N 103.6245690°E
- Country: Malaysia
- State: Johor
- Seat: Kulai
- Local area government(s): Kulai Municipal Council

Government
  - District officer: Haji Mohd Khir Johari bin Salleh

Area
  - Total: 753.75 km^{2} (291.02 sq mi)

Population (2020)
  - Total: 329,497
  - Density: 437.14/km^{2} (1,132.2/sq mi)
- Time zone: UTC+8 (MST)
  - Summer (DST): UTC+8 (Not observed)
- Postcode: 81xxx
- Calling code: +6-07
- Vehicle registration plates: J

The Kulai District is a district in the state of Johor, Malaysia. Its district capital is Kulai Town. It covers Kulai Town, Ayer Bemban, Bandar Putra Kulai, Bukit Batu, Indahpura, Bandar Baru Kangkar Pulai, Kelapa Sawit, Saleng, Sedenak, Seelong, Senai, and Sengkang. Kulai is also within Iskandar Malaysia economic zone.

== Name ==
The district was formerly a part of the Pulai Valley, which covered Mukim Pulai and the current subdistrict. The name Kulai 龟来 (pinyin: Guīlái), which means turtles are coming, was a Chinese mispronounciation of Pulai. Chinese Hakka peoples led by a man named Huang Guo Mao emigrated to Johor from Qing China during the late 19th century and opened a settlement in the area, and had renamed the place after the influx of turtles coming to the area after heavy flooding.

== Geography ==
Kulai is one of three landlocked districts of Johor (the other two being Kluang and Segamat) with an area of 753.75 km^{2} (291.02 sq mi), which is slightly smaller than the size of Singapore, a sovereign country situated approximately 12 km (7.5 miles) to the south of the district. It has a population of 223,306 at the 2010 Census (provisional result). It has a mix of urban and rural settlements with a majority of the population settling in towns near Johor Bahru. These population centers, such as Kulai and Senai effectively became suburbs of the greater metropolitan area in Kulai district.

== History ==
Kulai Old Town

The earliest settlement in Kulai is located at Sayong River, now at Bandar Tenggara, which have existed since the Srivijayan era. The Orang Asli settlement at the upstream of Sayong River was the hometown to the Malay Singaporean folklore hero Badang. Badang was the Hulubalang during the reign of Sri Rana Wikrama of the Kingdom of Singapura, a city kingdom prior to the establishment of Sultanate of Malacca. This suggest that the settlement in Sungai Sayong should have been established no later than the 12th century.

In 1548, after the demise of last Sultan of Melaka in exile, Mahmud Shah, his prince Alauddin Shah moved his capital from Kampar, Sumatra to Sayong and established the new Kota Sayong Pinang. Kota Sayong was the first capital of Sultanate of Johor on the peninsular mainland. The Sultan later moved the capital city to Kota Batu at the mouth of Johor River.

The modern district of Kulai was a former sub-district of Johor Bahru. The subdistrict was upgraded to the full district status on 1 January 2008 as District of Kulaijaya. The district is recognised as the state's 9th district. On 28 August 2015, Sultan of Johor Sultan Ibrahim Ismail ibni Sultan Iskandar decreed to revert Kulaijaya's name back to its original name.

== Government ==
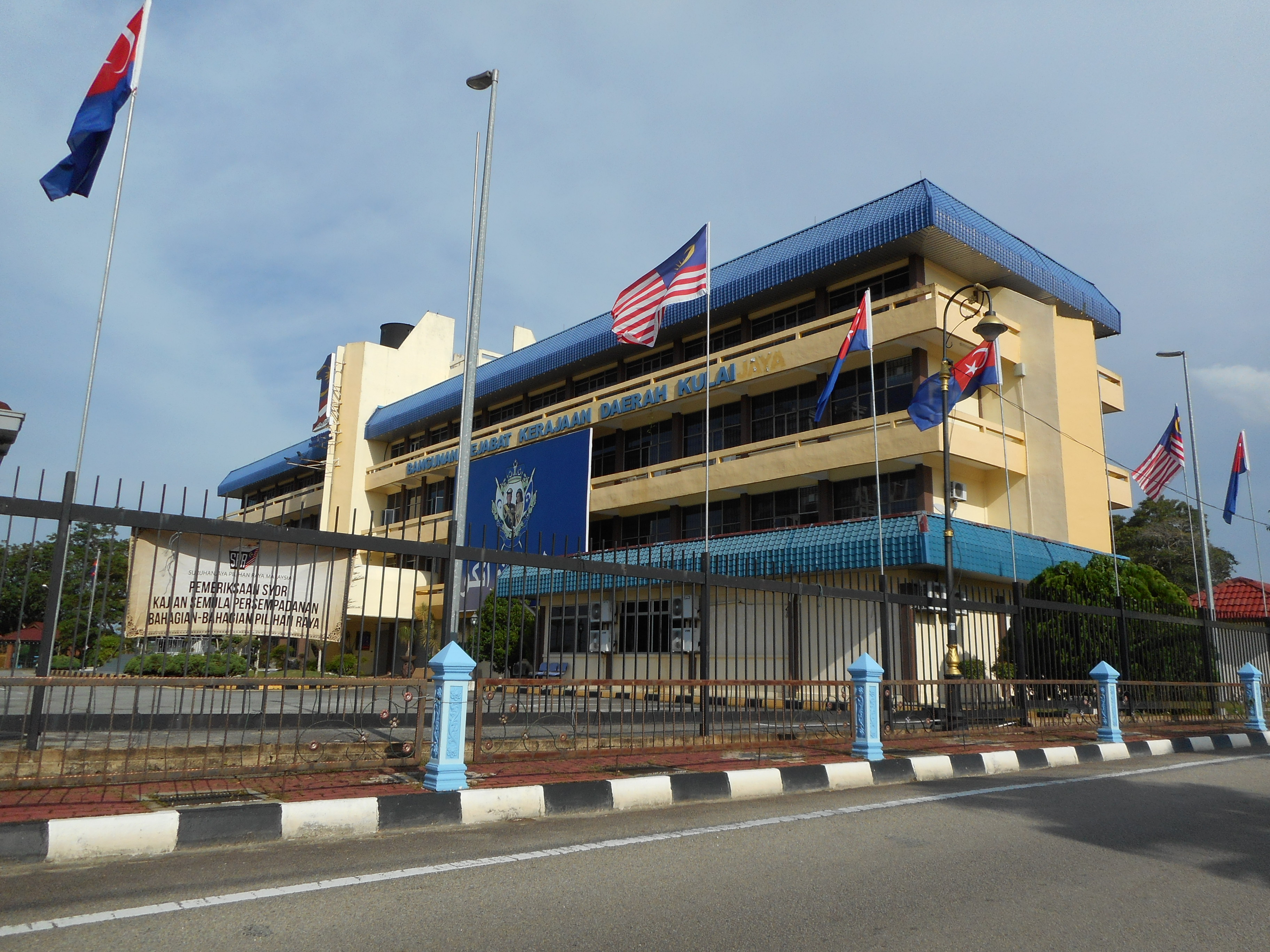
Kulai District Office

The local authorities of Kulai are Kulai Municipal Council and Iskandar Puteri City Council, the part of southern Kulai, etc.: Kangkar Pulai. Kulai Town also the administry centre of Kulai District and Kulai Municipal Council.

== Administrative divisions ==

Kulai District is divided into 4 mukims:

- Bukit Batu
- Kulai Town
- Sedenak
- Senai

== Demography ==
Historical population
Year	Pop.	±%
2010	245,294	—
2020	329,497	+34.3%
Figures before 2008 is included under Johor Bahru District. Source:

Malay made up 55% of the total population in Kulai. This is followed by Malaysian Chinese (33.7%) and Malaysian Indian (10.7%).

== Federal Parliament and State Assembly Seats ==
List of Kulai district representatives in the Federal Parliament (Dewan Rakyat)

Parliament	Seat Name	Member of Parliament	Party
P158	Tebrau	Jimmy Puah Wee Tse	Pakatan Harapan (PKR)
P162	Iskandar Puteri	Liew Chin Tong	Pakatan Harapan (DAP)
P163	Kulai	Teo Nie Ching	Pakatan Harapan (DAP)

List of Kulai district representatives in the State Legislative Assembly (Dewan Undangan Negeri)

Parliament	State	Seat Name	State Assemblyman	Party
P158	N41	Puteri Wangsa	Amira Aisya	MUDA
P162	N49	Kota Iskandar	Pandak Ahmad	Barisan Nasional (UMNO)
P163	N50	Bukit Permai	Mohd Jafni Md Shukor	Barisan Nasional (UMNO)
P163	N51	Bukit Batu	Arthur Chiong Sen Sern	Pakatan Harapan (PKR)
P163	N52	Senai	Wong Bor Yang	Pakatan Harapan (DAP)

== Other Towns ==
- Kulai Town
- Ayer Bemban
- Bukit Batu
- Kangkar Pulai
- Kelapa Sawit
- Saleng
- Sedenak
- Seelong
- Senai

== Economy ==
The main economy activities in the district are information and communication technology, biotechnology and logistics.

== Tourist attractions ==
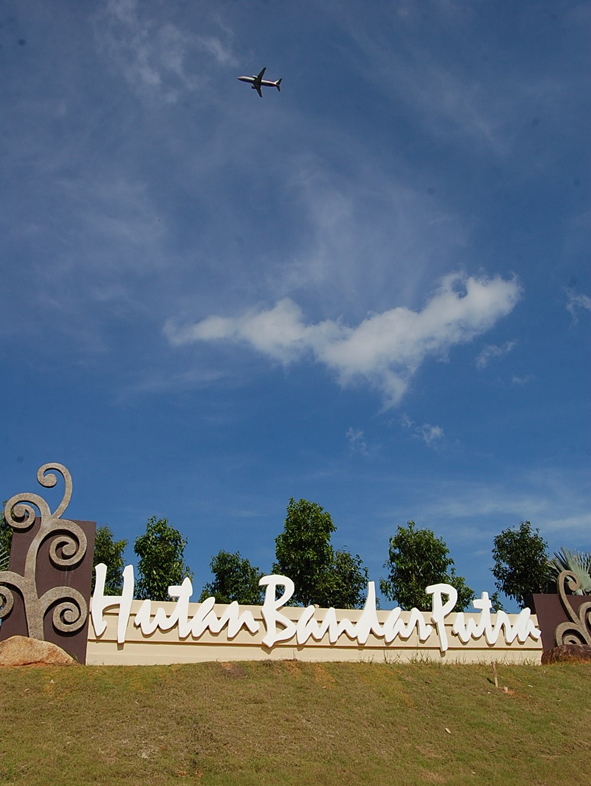
Hutan Bandar Putra

- Johor Premium Outlets
- Mount Pulai
- Hutan Bandar Putra Kulai (Putra Recreation Forest)
- Nanyan Aquarium Centre, Ayer Bemban
- Hua Guo Shan Temple, Sedenak (士年纳路口花果山)
- Kulai Putuo Village (古来普陀村)

== Transportation ==
=== Roads ===
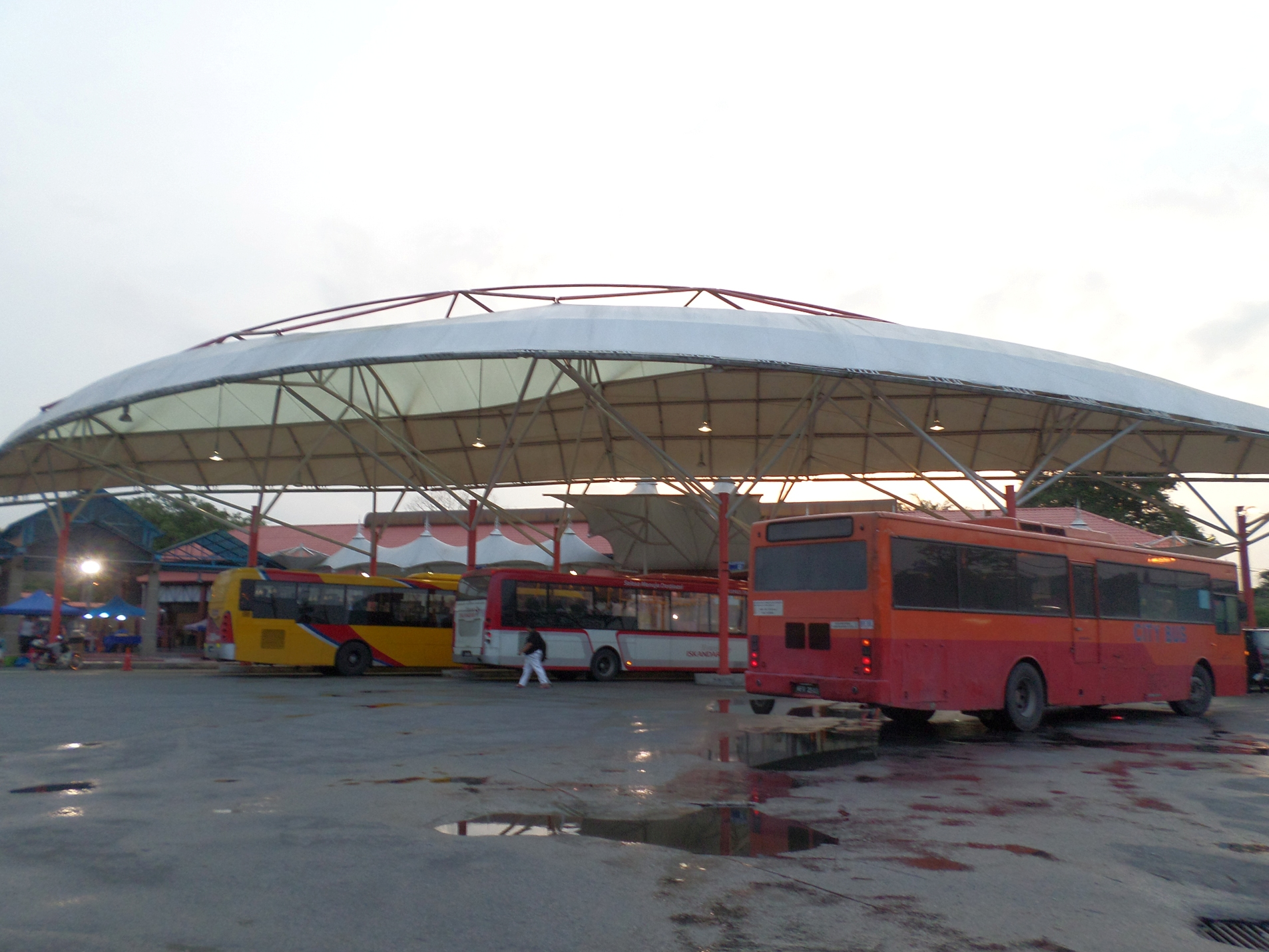
Kulai Bus Terminal

Skudai Highway or Federal route 1 is the most important inner link in Kulai District, with many access along the road such as Senai Airport Highway 16, Skudai–Pontian Highway 5, Jalan Kulai-Kota Tinggi 94, Diamond Interchange (access to Bandar Putra, Indahpura and proposed new NSE exit), proposed Kulai Inner Ring Road. The government proposed to open a new road, Kulai-Senai Bypass, to resolve the traffic jam problem of the Skudai Highway.

Kulai was an important stopover on the Johor Bahru-Kuala Lumpur trunk road in the 1970s and 1980s until the North–South Expressway (NSE) E2 opened in 1994, which bypassed the town. Senai North Interchange (NSE)253 is the connection to Singapore (from the east to the west).NSE is also one of the access points to the Mount Pulai nature reserve. Senai Airport, the international airport which serves Johor is within the municipality.

The Second Link Expressway E3 is also an access to connect to Iskandar Puteri, Singapore (Tuas). The Senai–Desaru Expressway (SDE) Senai–Desaru Expressway connects Senai and Desaru more quickly.

=== Rails ===
The district also has one railway station run by the Malayan Railway (KTM) in Kulai Town.

=== Airport ===
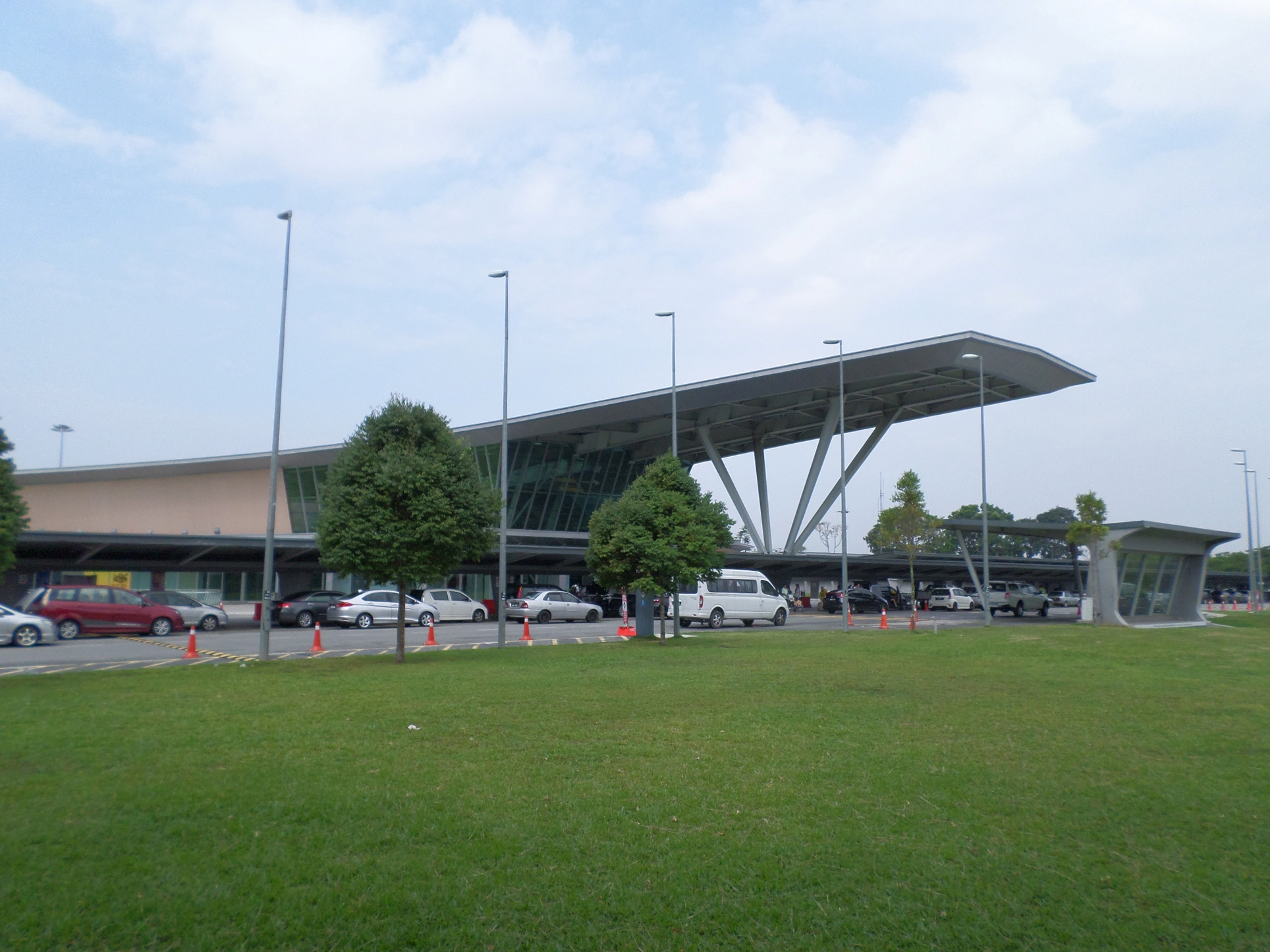
Senai International Airport

The district houses the Senai International Airport which is located in Senai. The airport has flights to as far as China, Saudi Arabia, and Indonesia.

== See also ==
- Kulai
- Districts of Malaysia
