= Indahpura =

Coordinates: 1.6187°N 103.6063°E

Indahpura 优美城
- Township
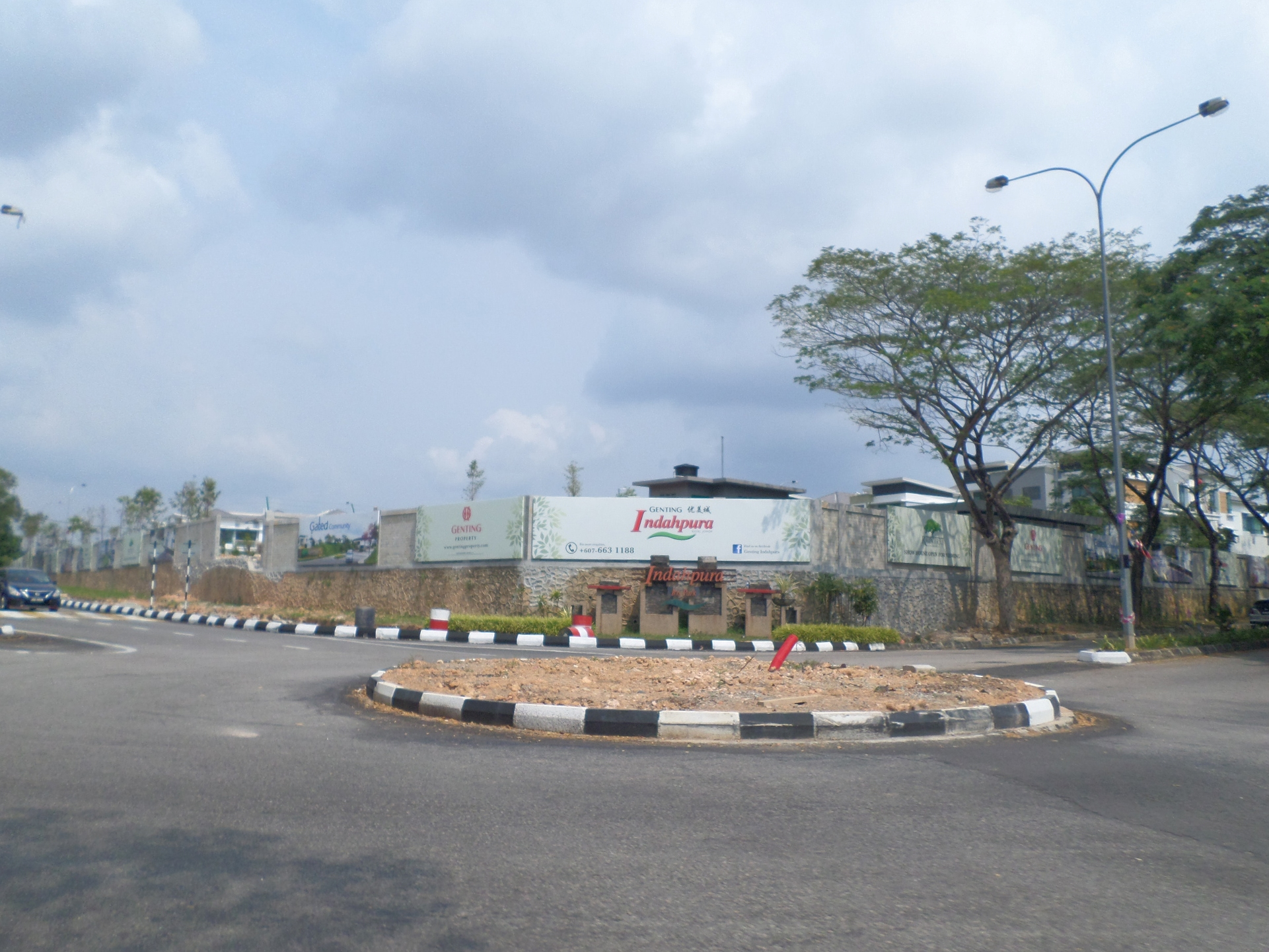
- Interactive map of Indahpura 优美城
- Country: Malaysia
- State: Johor
- District: Kulai

Indahpura (Jawi: ايندهڤورا; Chinese: 优美城) or Asiatic Indahpura is a township in Kulai District, Johor, Malaysia. Indahpura is translated as "Beautiful City" in Malay. Indahpura sprawls over 7,000 acres (28 km^{2}). Sprawling over 6,800 acres of freehold land in Kulai @ Iskandar Malaysia, is a masterpiece of Genting Property. It was erected since 2007 and contains various development including residential, commercial, light industrial, shopping malls, an education hub, and a healthcare center.

It is located at the North West of Johor Bahru and accessible to parts of Johor Bahru via the Second Link and North South Expressway.

The township is developed by Asiatic Development Berhad of Genting group. The Kulai District and Land Office will be built there. Indahpura is located 30 km (30 mins) north-west from Johor Bahru and south-west of Kulai city. The township is located 10 km (10 mins) from Senai International Airport and AirCargo Hub.

Indahpura is located in the Iskandar Malaysia corridor comprising the proposed Kulai District Police Headquarters, 150 acres (0.61 km^{2}) of MSC Cyber City, Senai International Airport and AirCargo Hub, Senai Industrial Park, and Foon Yew High School (Kulai Campus).

Golf courses such as Palm Resort Golf & Country Club, Palm Villa Golf & Country Club, and Orchard Golf & Country Club are within 10 km radius from Indahpura.

- The National Railway line (KTM)
- Accessibility with 6 lanes main ingress and egress
- Education corridor

== Facilities ==
- Hospital Temenggong Seri Maharaja Tun Ibrahim
- TM Point
- Kedai Tenaga Nasional Berhad
- Jabatan Pendaftaran Negara
- Kulai Besar Public Clinic
- McDonald's
- Toyota Service Centre
- Mazda, Proton, Perodua Sales Gallery
- Maybank, CIMB Bank, OCBC Bank, BSN, Hong Leong Bank

== Education ==
Indahpura is being developed into a regional education corridor of Kulai and Iskandar Development Region. Schools in Indahpura are Foon Yew High School Kulai Campus, Sekolah Kebangsaan Indahpura, Sekolah Menengah Kebangsaan Indahpura, Sekolah Menengah Pendidikan Khas Vokasional Indahpura, and Sekolah Jenis Kebangsaan Cina Kulai 2.

== Transportation ==
Second Link Expressway provides exits there to Johor Premium Outlets and residential area.

== Shopping ==
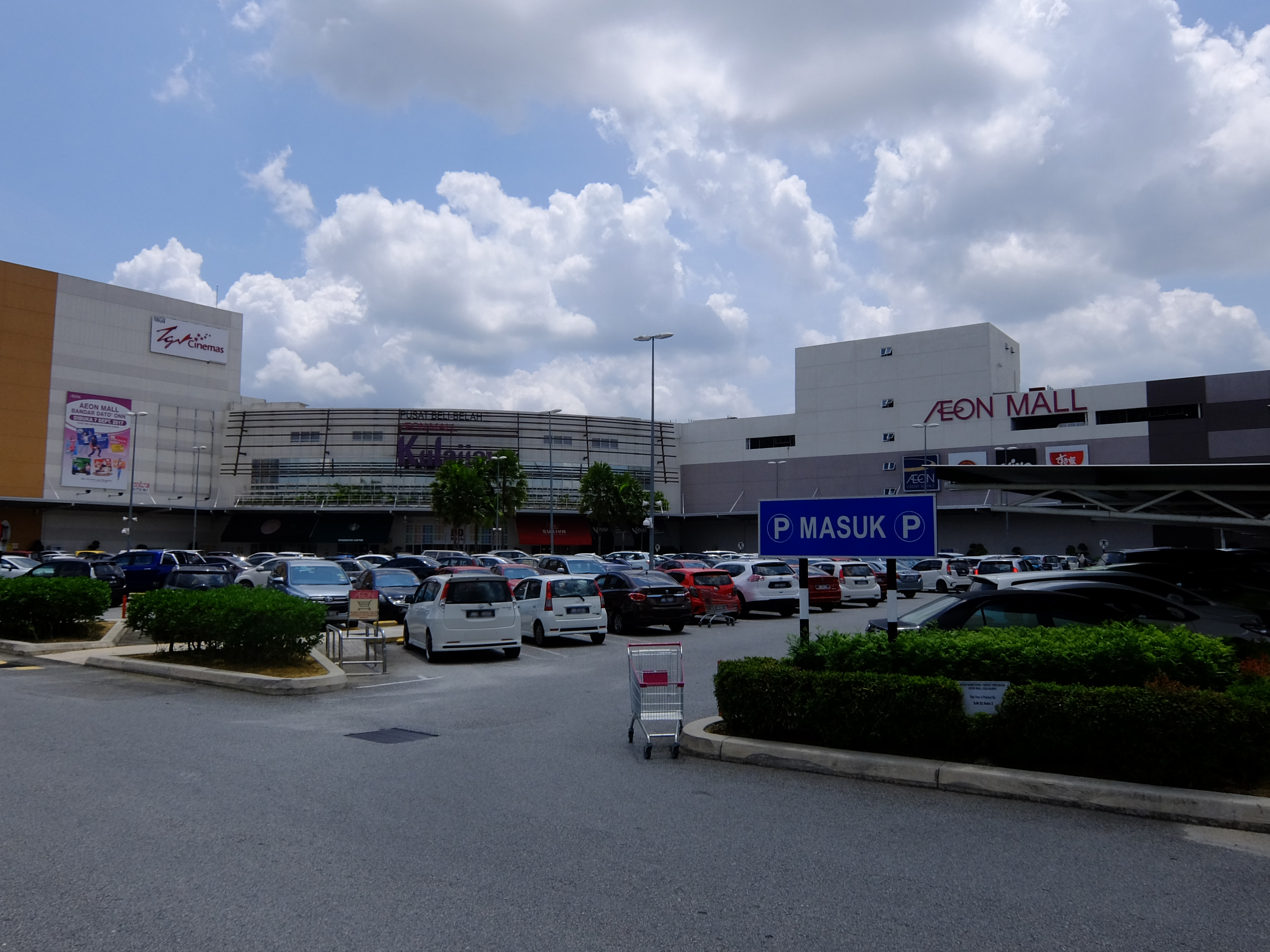
AEON Kulaijaya

- AEON Kulaijaya
- Johor Premium Outlets
- The Commune (Opening to 2023Q4)
