= Kelapa Sawit =

Town in Kulai District, Johor, Malaysia

Coordinates: 1°40′N 103°32′E

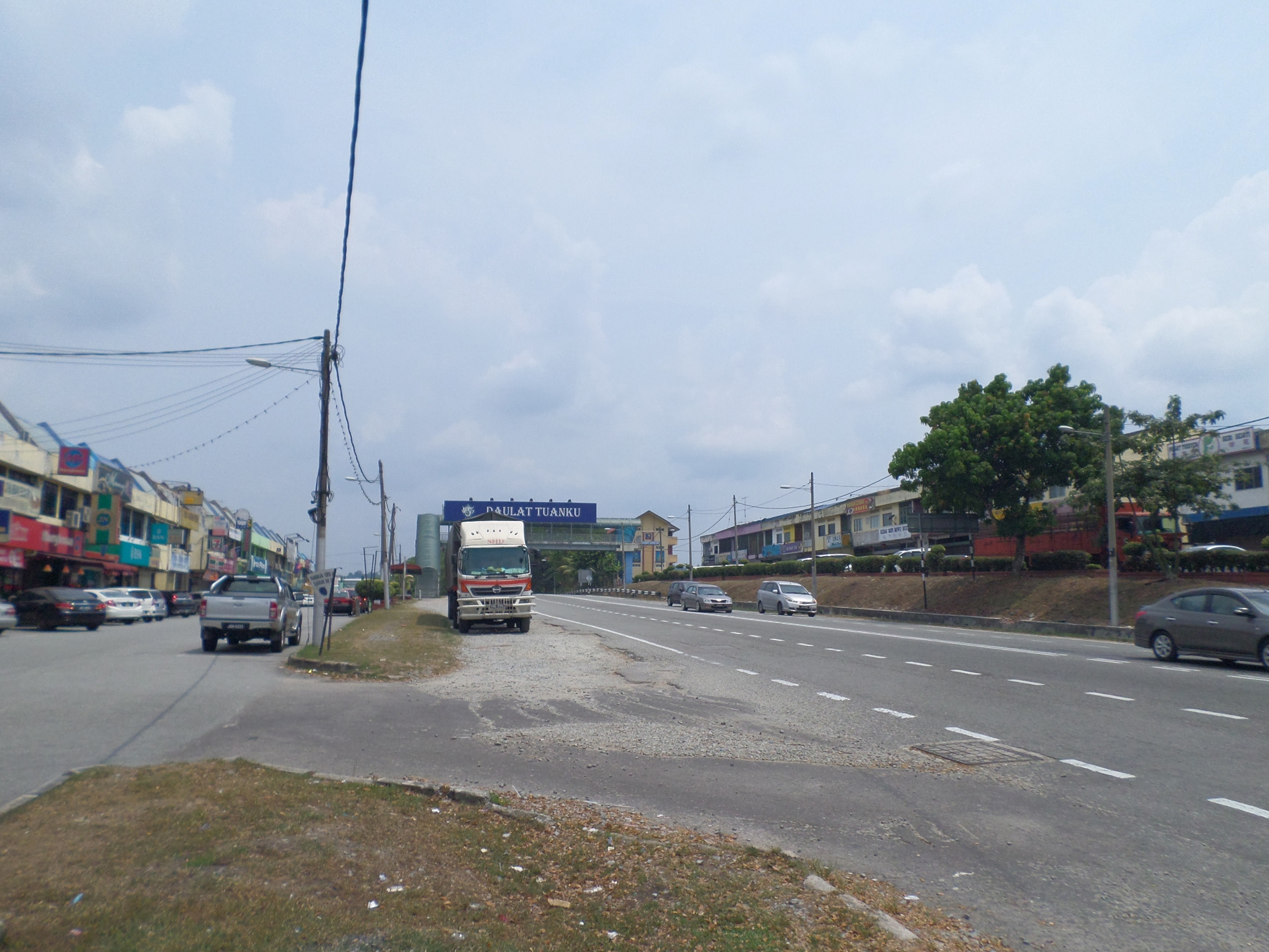
Kelapa Sawit

Kelapa Sawit is a small town located along Jalan Kulai-Air Hitam, Malaysian Federal Roads System Route 1 in Kulai District, Johor, Malaysia. "Kelapa Sawit" means "oil palm" in Bahasa Malaysia, reflecting its agricultural background.

== History ==
The town features a predominantly Hakka community which was established in the 1950s. During the Malayan Emergency, the British colonial administration forcibly relocated tens of thousands of ethnic Chinese residents into guarded New Villages like Kelapa Sawit under the Briggs Plan to isolate them from communist guerrillas. Many of the older generations within the village continue to preserve their cultural traditions and communicate primarily using the Hakka dialect.

== Economy ==
Historically, the town's name originated from its location next to a large palm oil plantation estate. The community experienced severe localized air pollution issues for many years until the estate's primary oil palm processing mill was officially decommissioned and closed down.

Villagers have traditionally relied on agriculture for their livelihood. Before a strict agricultural commodity tax on pepper took effect in the 1980s, Kelapa Sawit was widely recognized as a prominent pepper-producing town. Local farmers have since shifted their reliance toward alternative cash crops, including palm oil, durian, and various leafy vegetables heavily cultivated for export to the Singapore market.

== Tourism ==
In recent years, Kelapa Sawit has transitioned from a quiet agricultural settlement into a cultural tourist destination, driven primarily by the "Let's Art at Sawit" street art initiative. The town's alleyways feature vibrant murals, creative artworks, and traditional Hakka culinary staples—such as lei cha (thunder tea rice) and choi pan dumplings—as their main selling points. The town frequently attracts weekend travelers, particularly tourists visiting from neighboring Singapore looking for a short getaway.

== Education ==
The town is equipped with local primary and secondary education facilities that cater to the local community and surrounding settlements:

- SJK (C) Sawit: The primary Chinese-medium school serving the town, featuring a history dating back to its establishment during the New Village resettlement era when eight nearby schools were combined into one
- SK Polis Kem: A national primary school situated at the Batu 26 police camp area, which serves as a prominent educational landmark within the community
- Sekolah Agama Batu 26: A state-funded Islamic religious school
- SMK Kelapa Sawit: The primary public secondary institution serving the town's youth

== Transportation ==
Regional stage buses operated by Green Transit Liner (GTL) provide scheduled daily trips linking Kelapa Sawit to northern destinations like Ayer Hitam.
