= Senai =

Coordinates: 1°35′N 103°38′E

- Mukim
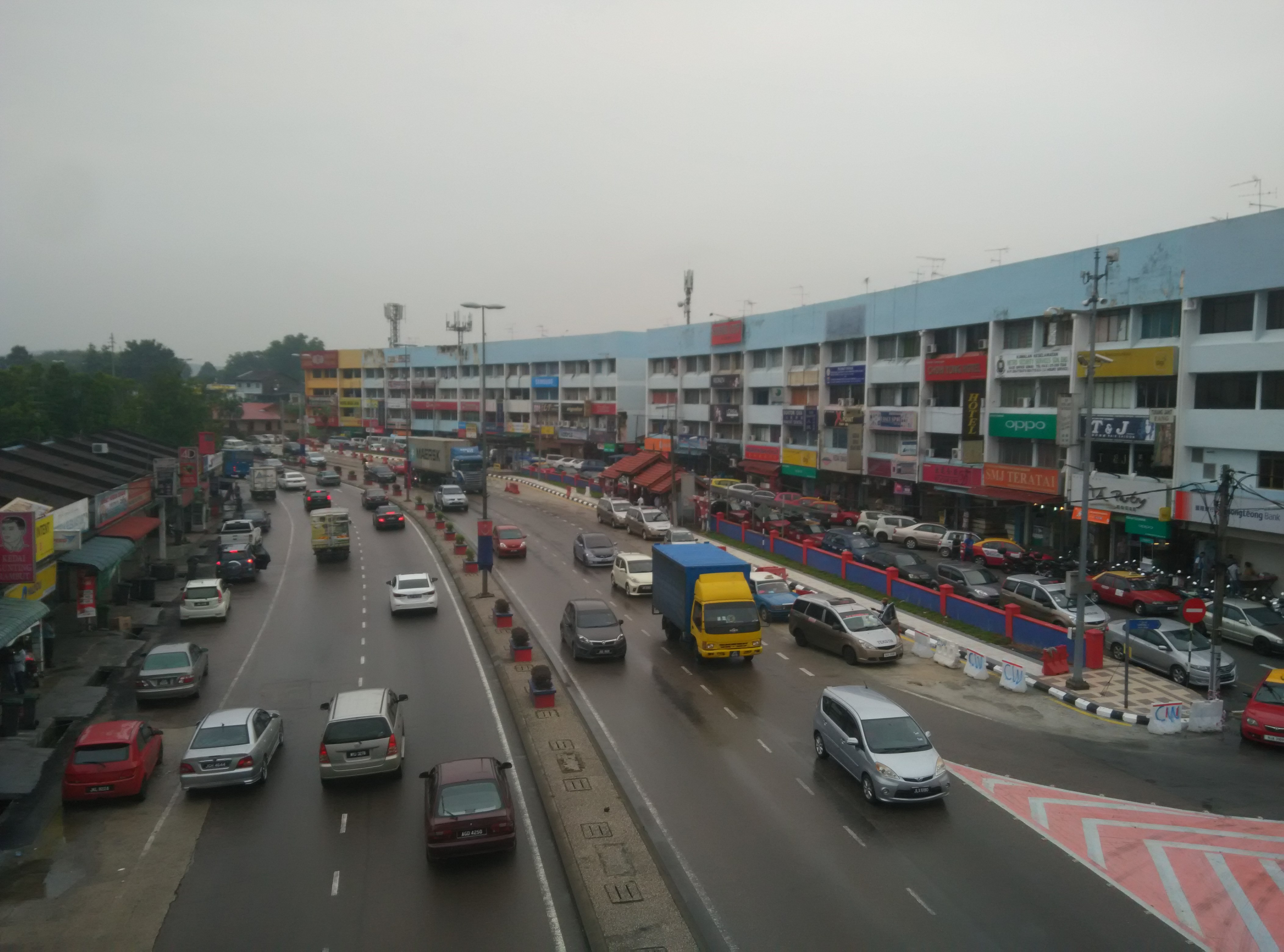
- Interactive map of Senai
- Country: Malaysia
- State: Johor
- District: Kulai

Population
  - Total: 67,440

Senai is a town and mukim in Kulai District, Johor, Malaysia. It is the base for several major multinational electronics manufacturers. This sprawl town is one of the flagship zones of the Iskandar Malaysia.

== Name ==
The name, Senai, is derived from a local tree, Sinai, which thrived in the region in the early 20th century.

== Geography ==
Senai in Kulai District

Senai is located four kilometres south from Kulai, and four kilometres north of Skudai.

== Demographics ==
The town has a total population of 67,440 people. Chinese, Malay and Tamil Indian are the main ethnic groups. The majority of the Chinese in Senai belong to the Hakka dialect group.

== Housing ==
Historic Senai consists of pre-World War II shophouses along the main road, which is divided into an upper street and a lower street by the river in the middle. During the post-war Malayan Emergency in the late 1940s to early 1950s, resettlement policies propagated newer villages in Senai as well. A third phase of settlement was enacted in the 1970s when low-cost housing was introduced. Four main lorongs (lanes) of residence continue to dominate these older housing estates.

The 1980s brought about a major boost to Senai's population, which resulted from the construction of the Senai International Airport then, increasing economic interest in the region. Consequently, this called for the establishment of additional housing estates to cater to the expansion of Senai's infrastructure.

== Education ==
Senai has 3 Chinese public primary schools - SJK (C) Senai (士乃华文小学), SJK (C) Saleng(沙令华小) and SJK (C) Seelong (泗隆华小), two public primary Schools (SK Senai and SK Taman Senai Utama), and a public secondary school (SMK Senai Linkun).

SK Senai which is located in the middle of Senai Town consists of students from 6- (pre-school) to 12-year-old pupils. In January 2008, the student count was 892 and 57 teachers.

== Tourist attractions ==
A night market (locally known as pasar malam) regularly takes place in Taman Aman every Wednesday evening from 6 to 10 p.m. Vendors sell various local food and drinks, local produce such as fresh vegetables and fruits, clothes, and other grocery items at low prices. Also, a morning market selling fresh vegetables and meat opens 6 days a week in Taman Senai Utama, but closes on Monday.

== Transportation ==
=== Air ===
The town houses the Senai International Airport.

=== Road ===
The town is located along Skudai Highway, a part of Federal Route 1 which connects Johor Bahru with Kuala Lumpur. Public bus services that pass through Senai are TransitLink, Causeway Link, Triton, Maju and S&S. These services ply the roads between Senai and Johor Bahru.
