= Sedenak =

Coordinates: 1°42′49.2″N 103°31′29.2″E

- Mukim
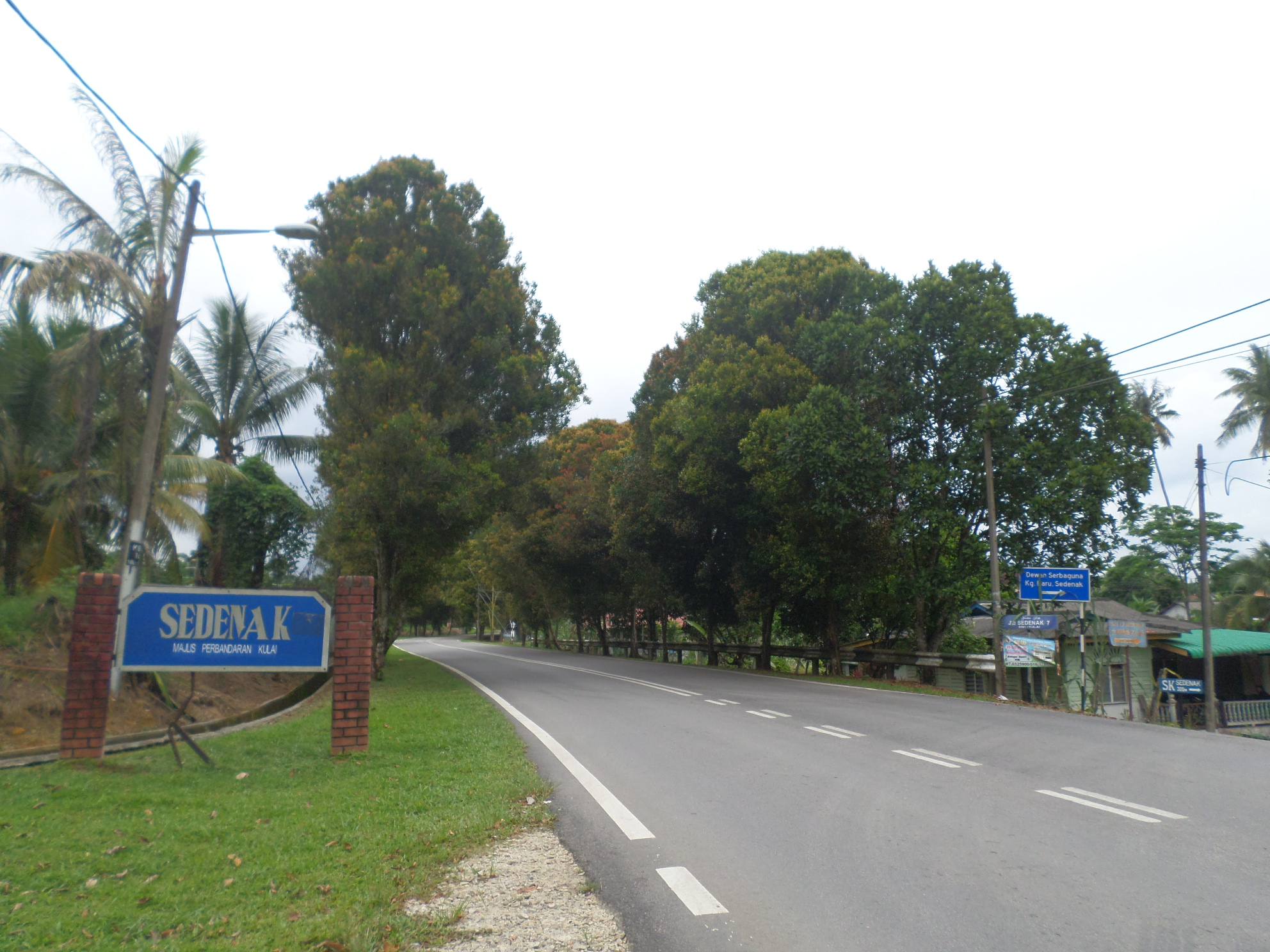
- Interactive map of Sedenak
- Country: Malaysia
- State: Johor
- District: Kulai

Area
  - Total: 232 km^{2} (90 sq mi)

Population
  - Total: 14,845
  - Density: 64.0/km^{2} (166/sq mi)

Sedenak is a mukim in Kulai District, Johor, Malaysia.

== Geography ==
Sedenak in Kulai District

The mukim spans over an area of 232 km^{2}.

== Demographics ==
The mukim has a total population of 14,845 people.

== Tourist Attraction ==
Sedenak Hua Guo Shan Temple (士年纳花果山廟) is a hill Temple dedicated to Monkey God, it is also a popular tourist attraction for local and oversea devotees.
