= Iskandar Coastal Bridge =

Iskandar Coastal Bridge Jambatan Pesisir Pantai Iskandar جمبتن ڤسيسير ڤنتاي إسکندر
- Coordinates: 1°28′37″N 103°42′12″E
- Carries: Motor vehicles, Pedestrians
- Crosses: Skudai River and Danga River
- Locale: Federal Route 52 Iskandar Coastal Highway, Johor Bahru
- Official name: Iskandar Coastal Bridge
- Maintained by: Iskandar Region Development Authority (IRDA); Malaysian Public Works Department (JKR) Johor Bahru

Characteristics
- Design: arch bridge
- Total length: --
- Width: --
- Longest span: --

History
- Designer: Iskandar Region Development Authority (IRDA)
- Constructed by: Iskandar Region Development Authority (IRDA); Malaysian Public Works Department (JKR)
- Opened: 2011

Location
- Interactive map of Iskandar Coastal Bridge

Iskandar Coastal Bridge or Jambatan Persisir Pantai Iskandar (Jawi: جمبتن ڤسيسير ڤنتاي إسکندر) and typically referred to as the Skudai River Bridge is an arch-shaped river bridge in Johor Bahru District, Johor, Malaysia. It is a second arch bridge in Johor Bahru after Permas Jaya Bridge. The bridge crosses Skudai River and Danga River. The bridge is built to shorten the travel distance between Iskandar Puteri to Johor Bahru town area from—km (estimated) to—km (Estimated).

== History ==
The construction of the bridge was proposed when a new coastal highway from Danga Bay to Nusajaya, a project part of the Iskandar Development Region (IDR) (now Iskandar Malaysia) was announced on 30 July 2006. Construction began on 2008 and was completed in 2011.
