= Iskandar Coastal Highway =

Road in Malaysia

Federal Route 52

Route information
- Maintained by Malaysian Public Works Department
- Length: 23 km (14 mi) Iskandar Puteri–Danga Bay: 15 km (9.3 mi); Danga Bay–City Centre: 8 km (5.0 mi)

Major junctions
- West end: Iskandar Puteri
- Kota Iskandar Highway; Bukit Indah Highway; FT 1 Skudai Highway; FT 188 Johor Bahru Inner Ring Road; Jalan Wong Ah Fook; Jalan Tanjung Puteri
- East end: Johor Bahru City Centre

Location
- Country: Malaysia
- Primary destinations: Kota Iskandar, Taman Perling, Bukit Indah, Danga Bay

Highway system
- Highways in Malaysia; Expressways; Federal; State

The Iskandar Coastal Highway (ICH) (formerly Johor Bahru West Coast Parkway) (Malay: Lebuhraya Pesisir Pantai Iskandar (LPPI)) or the stretch of road that includes Lebuhraya Sultan Iskandar, Persiaran Sultan Abu Bakar (formerly Jalan Skudai, Jalan Abu Bakar) and Persiaran Sultan Ismail (formerly Jalan Ibrahim and Persiaran Tun Sri Lanang) (Federal Route 52 (Iskandar Puteri–Danga Bay) and Johor State Route 1 (Danga Bay–City Centre)) is a highway in Johor Bahru District, Johor, Malaysia. The 23 km (14 mi) highway connects Iskandar Puteri in the west to Johor Bahru in the east. It is a toll free highway and part of the Iskandar Malaysia project. The Iskandar Coastal Highway is the fifth east–west-oriented expressway in the Iskandar Malaysia area after the Pasir Gudang Highway, the Pontian–Johor Bahru Link of the Second Link Expressway, the Senai–Desaru Expressway and the Johor Bahru East Coast Highway.

== Route background ==
The Kilometre Zero of the Federal Route 52 is located at Bulatan Ledang roundabout in Iskandar Puteri.

The Kilometre Zero of Johor State Route J1 is located at Johor Bahru city centre and the milestone is located near the Johor Bahru City Council (MBJB) main headquarters.

== History ==
it used to be known as the Johor Bahru West Coast Parkway. The 8 km (5 mi) parkway was a part of Federal Route 1 before Skudai Highway was built. However, the importance of Johor Bahru as a trade centre for Singaporeans after the separation of Singapore from Malaysia in 1965 became the major factor of the construction of Skudai Highway. Skudai Highway bypasses the portion which becomes the present-day Johor Bahru West Coast Parkway. As a result, the two-lane Jalan Skudai was recommissioned as Johor State Route 1. The two-lane Jalan Skudai became the main coastal road in Johor Bahru as the main alternative to Skudai Highway.

In 1996, the construction of Persiaran Tun Sri Lanang as a separate carriageway for JB West Coast Parkway was completed, as a part of the Johor Bahru Waterfront project. However, the project was abandoned due to very high cost, leaving Persiaran Tun Sri Lanang and Lot 1 as the only 2 structures completed for the project.

In 2002, the government of Johor proposed the Danga Bay project, not only to revive the former Lagun Puteri and Pantai Lido, but also to boost the economy of west Johor Bahru. The Danga Bay project included a 4-km upgrade of the two-lane Jalan Skudai as a dual carriageway. The road upgrade was completed by the end of 2003.

=== New Coastal Highway (Iskandar Puteri–Danga Bay) ===
Following the establishment of the Iskandar Development Region (IDR) (now Iskandar Malaysia) on 30 July 2006, the New Coastal Highway linking Iskandar Puteri from Danga Bay was announced. These include the six new interchanges along the highway such as Skudai-TAR interchange, Taman Perling diamond interchange, Bukit Indah diamond interchange, Nusajaya North cloverleaf interchange, Legoland Malaysia interchange and the Iskandar Puteri roundabout interchange. Construction began on 2008 and was completed in August 2011. The Johor Bahru West Coast Parkway and the New Coastal Highway has now combined to become Iskandar Coastal Highway.

In 2013, the stretch between Nusajaya and Danga Bay which known as Lebuhraya Sultan Iskandar was gazetted as a Federal Route 52.

=== Coastal Highway Southern Link ===
The 5.2 km Coastal Highway Southern Link is an extension of the Iskandar Coastal Highway that linking Medini in the northeast to Port of Tanjung Pelepas Highway interchange of the Second Link Expressway in the northwest. The turnkey contractor for the highway project are Sunway Group and SJIC Bina Sdn Bhd, which is a fully owned unit of Iskandar Investment Berhad. Construction began in 2015 and opened on 29 November 2017.

== Features ==
- Iskandar Coastal Bridge
- It is a main route to Legoland Malaysia.
- Act as a protocol route from Kota Iskandar to Johor Bahru.

At most sections, the Federal Route 52 and Johor State Route J1 was built under the JKR R5 road standard, allowing maximum speed limit of up to 90 km/h.

There are no alternate routes, or sections with motorcycle lanes.

=== Overlaps ===
- J239 Kota Iskandar Highway (Ledang Roundabout–Iskandar Puteri Roundabout Interchange)
- J106 Jalan Sungai Danga (Taman Perling–Kampung Sungai Danga)

== Interchange lists ==
The entire route is located in Johor Bahru District, Johor.

Legend:

- I/C - Interchange, I/S - Intersection, RSA - Rest and service area, OBR - Overhead bridge restaurant, R/R - Restaurant and rest plaza, L/B - Layby, V/P - Vista point, TN - tunnel, T/P - Toll plaza, BR - Bridge
- C - Cloverleaf, S - Stack, T-A - Trumpet-A, T-B - Trumpet-B, DT - Directional-T/Y, SDT - Semi-Directional-T/Y, P-Y - Partial-Y, D - Diamond, P-C - Partial cloverleaf, D-D - Diverging diamond, D-R - Direct ramp

=== Malaysia Federal Route 52 ===
==== Iskandar Puteri–Danga Bay ====
Location	km	mi	Exit	Name	Destinations	Notes
Iskandar Puteri				Kota Iskandar Highway	Kota Iskandar Highway – Gelang Patah, Pontian, Lima Kedai, Skudai Second Link Expressway / AH143 – Tuas (Singapore), Port Of Tanjung Pelepas (PTP), Senai, Senai International Airport, Malacca, Kuala Lumpur	Countinue as Kota Iskandar Highway
Iskandar Puteri	0.0	0.0	1	Bulatan Ledang Roundabout	Jalan Kampung Lalang – Iskandar Medical City; Persiaran Ledang – East Ledang, Ledang Heights	Roundabout
Iskandar Puteri				Iskandar Puteri Town Centre	Iskandar Puteri Town Centre – Bazar Anjung Nusajaya (Mydin)	Westbound
Iskandar Puteri	1.0	0.62	2	Bulatan Medini Roundabout I/C	Iskandar Medical City; Lebuh Kota Iskandar – Kota Iskandar, Puteri Harbour; Coastal Highway Southern Link – Medini	Roundabout interchange
Iskandar Puteri			3	Legoland Malaysia I/C	Jalan Legoland Malaysia – Medini Town Centre, Mall of Medini, Legoland Malaysia; Parking zone 1, Parking zone 2, Parking zone 3 (Touch 'n Go available)	Interchange
Iskandar Puteri			Sungai Udang bridge			
Iskandar Puteri			4	Iskandar Puteri (North) I/C	Kota Iskandar Highway – Kota Iskandar, Gelang Patah, Pontian, Lima Kedai, Skudai Second Link Expressway / AH143 – Tuas (Singapore), Port Of Tanjung Pelepas (PTP), Senai, Senai International Airport, Malacca, Kuala Lumpur	Cloverleaf interchange
Iskandar Puteri			Sungai Melayu bridge			
Iskandar Puteri				Horizon Hills	Horizon Hills	Eastbound
Iskandar Puteri			5	Bukit Indah (South) I/C	Bukit Indah Highway – Bukit Indah, Horizon Hills, Riveria Garden (Under construction) Second Link Expressway / AH143 – Tuas (Singapore), Senai International Airport, Kuala Lumpur	Cloverleaf interchange
Iskandar Puteri			6	Bukit Indah (East) I/C	Jalan Persiaran Perling 2 – Bukit Indah, Skudai, AEON Bukit Indah, Giant Hypermarket Nusa Bestari, Tesco Hypermarket Bukit Indah	Half diamond interchange
Iskandar Puteri			7	Taman Perling I/C	Jalan Persiaran Perling 1 – Perling, Pasir Gudang, Kota Tinggi, Perling Mall Second Link Expressway / AH143 – Tuas (Singapore), Senai International Airport, Kuala Lumpur	Half diamond interchange
Iskandar Puteri				Taman Sri Baiduri		
Iskandar Puteri				Masjid Lama Kampung Sungai Danga		
Iskandar Puteri				Taman D' Utama		
Iskandar Puteri				Taman Permata		
Iskandar Puteri			8	Danga I/C	J106 Jalan Sungai Danga – Kampung Sungai Danga, Perkampungan Orang Asli Sungai Danga, Restoran Sungai Danga Seafood	Interchange
MBIP–MBJB border limit			Iskandar Coastal Bridge; Sungai Danga/Skudai bridge			
Johor Bahru				Pulau Danga		
Johor Bahru			Sungai Kempas bridge			
Johor Bahru				Danga View Apartment		
Johor Bahru				Grand Straits Garden Seafood Restaurant	Grand Straits Garden Seafood Restaurant	
Johor Bahru	16.0	9.9		Danga Bay	Danga Bay – Tune Hotel Danga Bay, Johor Bahru	Westbound
Johor Bahru			9	Skudai-TAR I/C	FT 1 Skudai Highway – Kulai, Senai, Senai International Airport, Skudai, City Centre, Woodlands (Singapore); North–South Expressway Southern Route / AH2 – Kuala Lumpur, Malacca	Interchange
1.000 mi = 1.609 km; 1.000 km = 0.621 mi: Concurrency terminus; Route transition

=== Johor State Route J1 ===
==== Danga Bay–Istana Besar ====
Location	km	mi	Exit	Name	Destinations	Notes
Johor Bahru	8.0	5.0		–		
Johor Bahru				Danga Bay	Danga Bay – Tune Hotel Danga Bay, Johor Bahru	Northbound
Johor Bahru				Restoran Singgah Selalu	Restoran Singgah Selalu	
Johor Bahru			10	Istana Bukit Serene I/S	Jalan Straits View – Istana Bukit Serene	T-junctions
Johor Bahru				Danga Bay	Danga Bay – Tropicana Danga Bay	Northbound
Johor Bahru				Danga Bay U-Turn	U-Turn	
Johor Bahru				Johor State Secretary Residence	Johor State Secretary Residence	
Johor Bahru				Country Garden I/S	Country Garden Danga Bay	T-junctions
Johor Bahru				M Suites Garden	M Suites Garden	
Johor Bahru			11	Jalan Straits View I/S	Jalan Straits View	T-junctions
Johor Bahru			12	Jalan Sungai Chat I/S	Jalan Sungai Chat – Jalan Kolam Ayer, English College Johore Bahru, Sungai Chat Food Court	T-junctions
Johor Bahru			13	Jalan Thompson I/S	Jalan Thompson – Mawar Complex	T-junctions
Johor Bahru			Sungai Chat bridge			
Johor Bahru			14	JBIRR I/C	FT 188 Johor Bahru Inner Ring Road – Stulang, Pandan, Permas Jaya, Pasir Gudang, Woodlands (Singapore), Mahmoodiah Royal Mausoleum	Trumpet interchange
Johor Bahru			15A	Hospital Sultanah Aminah Exit	Sultanah Aminah Hospital	
Johor Bahru			15B	Hospital Sultanah Aminah I/S	Sultanah Aminah Hospital	T-junctions
Johor Bahru				Johor Syariah Court Complex	Johor Syariah Court Complex (Kompleks Mahkamah Syariah Johor)	
Johor Bahru				Johor Islamic Complex	Jalan Masjid Abu Bakar – Johor Islamic Complex (Pusat Islam Iskandar Johor), Sultan Abu Bakar State Mosque	
Johor Bahru			16	Jalan Gertak Merah I/S	Jalan Gertak Merah – Sultan Abu Bakar State Mosque, Maahad, State Zoo	T-junctions
Johor Bahru			Start/End of separate carriageway			
1.000 mi = 1.609 km; 1.000 km = 0.621 mi

==== Jalan Tun Dr Ismail and Jalan Ibrahim (City centre bound) ====
Location	km	mi	Exit	Name	Destinations	Notes
Johor Bahru			Start/End of separate carriageway			
Johor Bahru			17	Johor Bahru; Jalan Yahya Awal I/S	Jalan Yahya Awal – Istana Besar, Court Complex, JOTIC, Tabung Haji Building, Wisma Persekutuan (Federal building), JB Waterfront City	Junctions
Johor Bahru				U-Turn	U-Turn	
Johor Bahru			18	Johor Bahru; Jalan Dato' Onn Exit	Jalan Dato' Onn – Johor Bahru City Council (MBJB) main headquarters, Johor Bahru central post office, HSBC building, Sultan Ibrahim Building	
Johor Bahru	0.0	0.0	Peninsula Malaysia Kilometre Zero Monument; The original site of the southern terminus of the Peninsula Malaysia's main roads Historical site			
Johor Bahru				U-Turn	U-Turn	
Johor Bahru				Johor Bahru; Jalan Pahang	Jalan Pahang	Junctions
Johor Bahru				Johor Bahru; Jalan Trus	Jalan Trus – Laman Tun Sri Lanang	Junctions
Johor Bahru				Johor Bahru; Laman Tun Sri Lanang	Laman Tun Sri Lanang	
Johor Bahru			Sungai Segget bridge			
Johor Bahru				Johor Bahru; Jalan Wong Ah Fook	Jalan Wong Ah Fook – Johor Bahru City Square, Komtar@JBCC, Woodlands (Singapore), Bandar Sri Alam, Pasir Gudang, Kota Tinggi	Enter from City Centre bound
Johor Bahru				Persiaran Sultan Ismail	Persiaran Sultan Ismail (Jalan Tanjung Puteri) – Stulang, Woodlands (Singapore), ZON Duty Free Complex	
1.000 mi = 1.609 km; 1.000 km = 0.621 mi: Route transition

==== Persiaran Tun Sri Lanang (Danga Bay bound) ====
Location	km	mi	Exit	Name	Destinations	Notes
Johor Bahru				Johor Bahru	Jalan Tun Razak Enter ramp	To Danga Bay Bound
Johor Bahru			Sungai Segget bridge			
Johor Bahru	0.0	0.0		U-Turn	U-Turn – Laman Tun Sri Lanang	
Johor Bahru				U-Turn	Jalan Wong Ah Fook – City Centre, Woodlands (Singapore), Bandar Sri Alam, Pasir Gudang, Kota Tinggi	
Johor Bahru			17	Johor Bahru; Jalan Yahya Awal I/S	Jalan Yahya Awal – Istana Besar, Court Complex, JOTIC, Tabung Haji Building, Wisma Persekutuan (Federal building), JB Waterfront City	Junctions
Johor Bahru				Johor Bahru; JB Waterfront Mall	JB Waterfront Mall	
Johor Bahru			Start/End of separate carriageway			
1.000 mi = 1.609 km; 1.000 km = 0.621 mi
