= Johor Bahru City Council =

Malaysian city council

Johor Bahru City Council Majlis Bandaraya Johor Bahru
- Local Government Act 1976
- Emblem

Type
- Type: Local authority of Johor Bahru

History
- Founded: 1 January 1994
- Preceded by: Johor Bahru Municipal Council

Leadership
- Mayor: Hon Dato' Haji Mohd Haffiz bin Haji Ahmad, Since 3 January 2025
- Secretary: Mohd Farid Hassan

Structure
- Seats: 24
- Political groups: Councillors: BN (24): UMNO (14); MCA (8); MIC (2)
- Length of term: 1 April 2024–31 December 2025

Motto
- Berkhidmat, Berbudaya, Berwawasan (Service, Cultural, Visionary)

Meeting place
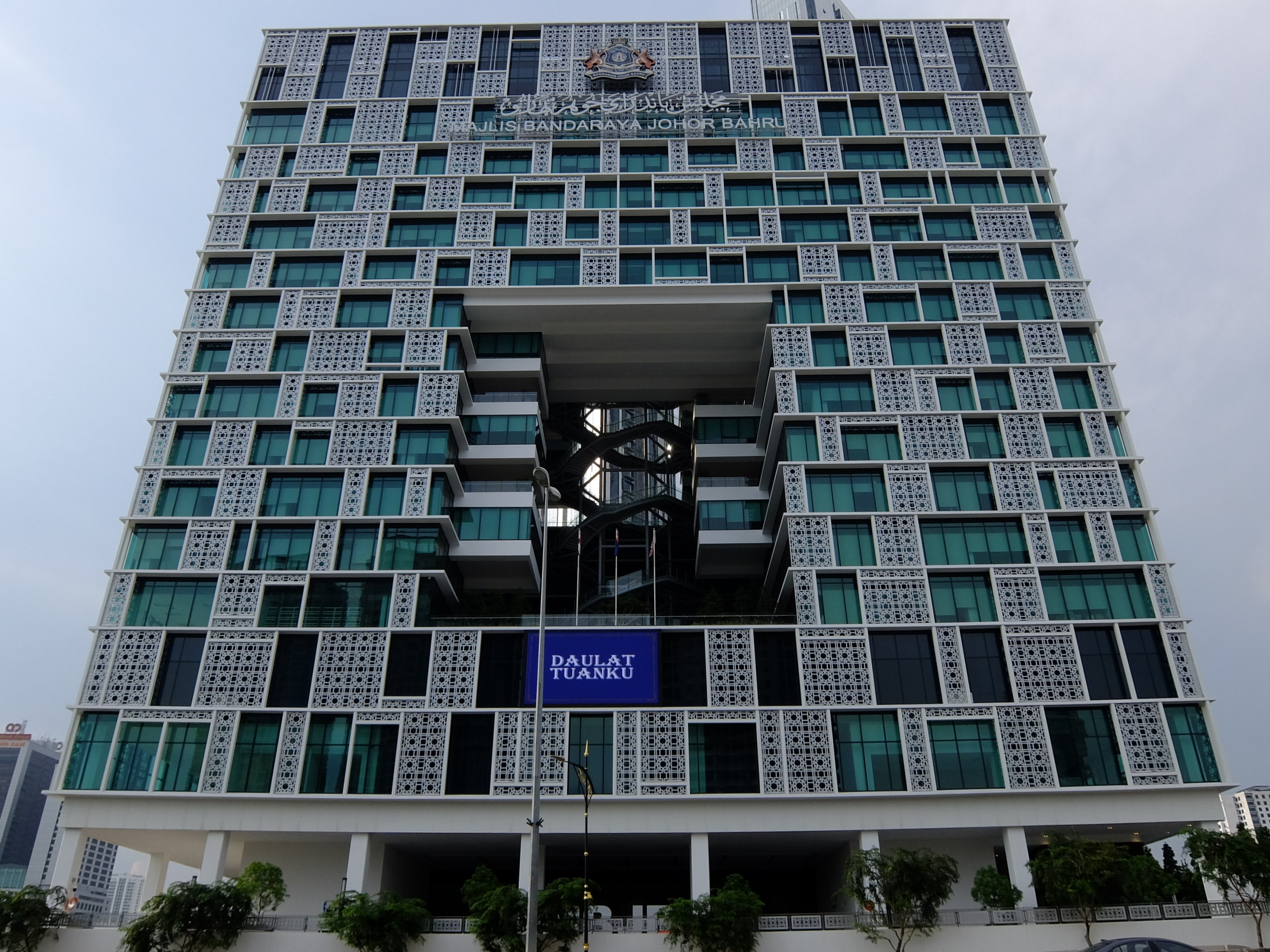
- MBJB Tower, Bukit Senyum

Website
- www.mbjb.gov.my

Johor Bahru City Council (MBJB; Malay: Majlis Bandaraya Johor Bahru) is the city council which administrates Johor Bahru city centre and other areas of the Iskandar Malaysia area in Johor, Malaysia. This agency is under Johor state government. MBJB are responsible for public health and sanitation, waste removal and management, town planning, environmental protection and building control, social and economic development and general maintenance functions of urban infrastructure.

== History ==
=== Town board and town council ===
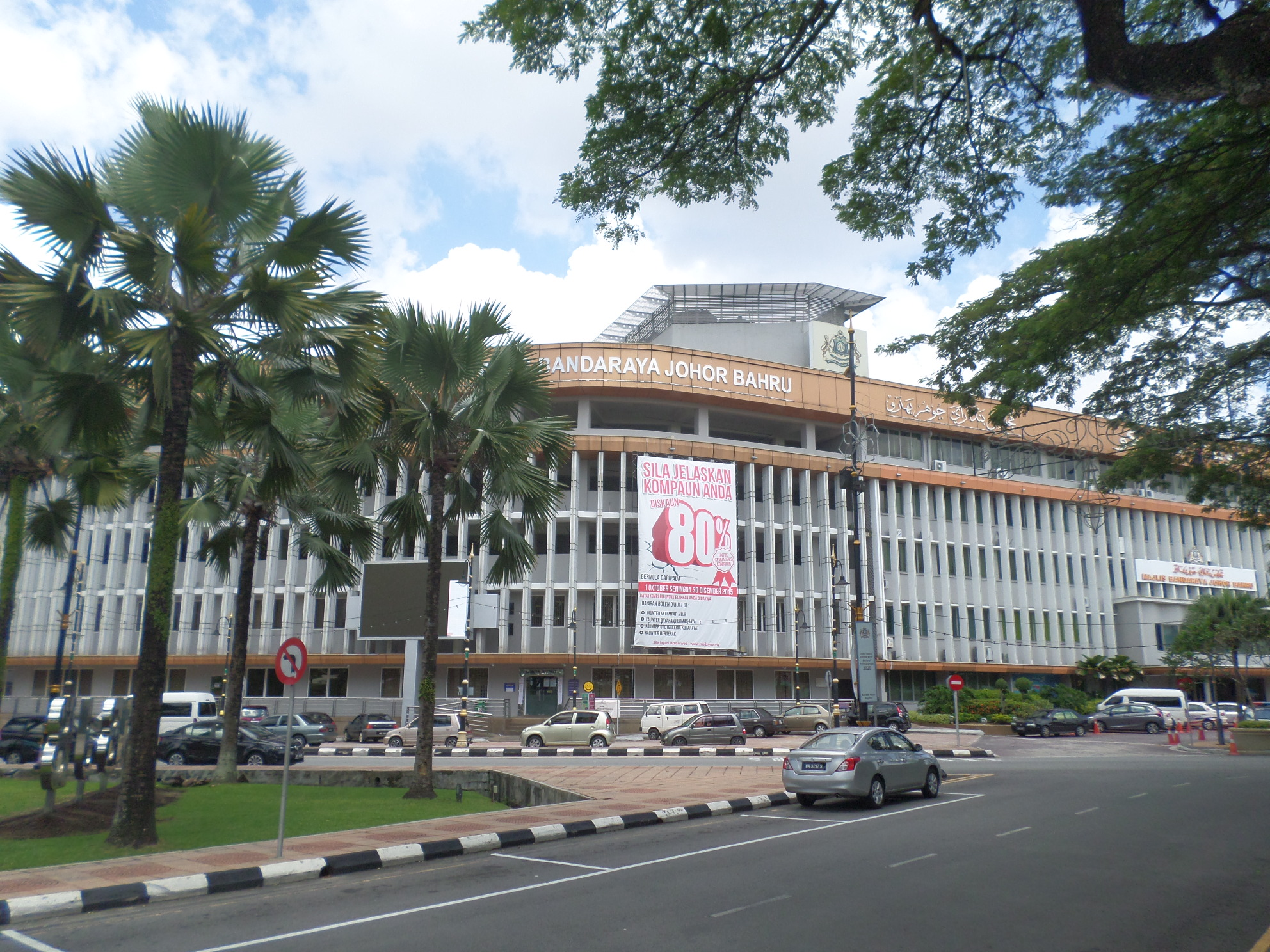
Former headquarters at Jalan Dato Onn, now one of the branch offices of the City Council. Its Enforcement, Health and Urban Transportation Departments still remain in this building.

Johor Bahru City Council's history begins with the establishment of the Town Board (Malay: Lembaga Bandaran) in 1910, with office at the Harbour Board (Syahbandar) Building near Sungai Segget that also housed offices of other departments like Survey, Public Works and Post Office. The administration comprised the President, Deputy President, Principal Medical Officer, Chief Commissioner of Police and several committee figures. In 1927, Sultan Ibrahim ordered these offices to move into the former Johore Hotel Building at Jalan Ibrahim.

Town Council (Malay: Majlis Bandaran) was established under Local Election Ordinance in 1950 to replace the town board. The Councillors at the time consisted of President Secretary (Johor Civil Service Oflicer), Assistant Financial Officer Building Inspector, Town Supervisor, Heaith Inspectors, Town Board Inspectors, notice senders, peons and clerks. Council elections were held since 1952 until these were suspended in 1965.

Status	Year	Area (in sq km)
Town Board	1933	12.12
Town Board	1949	13.85
Town Council	1956	48.99
Town Council	1962	68.42
Town Council	1976	80.53

=== Johor Bahru Municipal Council ===
Johor Bahru Municipal Council (Malay: Majlis Perbandaran Johor Bahru) was established in 1 April 1977 with an area of 119.50 square kilometres (46.14 sq mi), through merger of Town Council with Pandan and Kangkar Tebrau Local Councils on 1 April 1977 following local authorities restructuring in Johor under the provisions of the Local Government Act 1976 (Act 171). In 1992, Johor Bahru's revenue stood at RM 63 million, a requirement for a town to be elevated to a city. The eight departments under the municipal council were the Valuation, Enforcement, Urban Services, Health and Licences, Finance, Planning, Engineering and Secretary departments.

=== Johor Bahru City Council ===
Johor Bahru was granted city status on 1 January 1994 with initial city limit of 186 square kilometres (72 sq mi). Four housing estates of Taman Daya, Taman Megah Ria, Kota Puteri Township and Taman Rinting were transferred from Johor Bahru Tengah to the newly-declared city. Its city status was officially declared by the late Sultan Iskandar at midnight during a celebration ceremony attended by more than 400,000 residents at the newly built Johor Bahru City Square. The erstwhile Johor Bahru Municipal Council was also upgraded as the Johor Bahru City Council simultaneously on that day, with Yahya Hashim sworn in as its first mayor.

The new city council's non profit charity arm, the Johor Bahru City Foundation (Malay: Yayasan Bandaraya Johor Bahru, YBJB) was the brainchild of Muhyiddin Yassin, then the Menteri Besar of Johor as well as the Municipal Council's President. It was earlier corporatised on 9 December 1993 under the Trustee Act 1952 (Incorporation) to assist the poor, the disabled and the needy communities. The Foundation was launched by fourth Malaysian Prime Minister, Mahathir Mohamad on 21 January 1995 at the MBJB Indoor Stadium in Larkin, and currently headquartered at the Johor Tourist Information Centre (JOTIC).

Since the City council's establishment, its jurisdiction area expands in size, as areas around Johor Bahru City became gradually urbanised. In 2000, first parts of Tebrau area were added and transferred from Johor Bahru Tengah, increase the city limit to 220 square kilometres (85 sq mi).

On a 2 July 2014 meeting, the Johor State Government decided to transfer parts of Pulai Mukim across Skudai River along Jalan Ismail Sultan, Second parts of Tebrau Mukim, West parts of Plentong Mukim and a small portion of Sungai Tiram Mukim from Johor Bahru Tengah Municipal Council (now Iskandar Puteri City Council) to the city council through a redelination exercise that came into effect on 1 January 2016, while areas around Taman Rinting and Sierra Perdana ceded to Pasir Gudang Municipal Council (now Pasir Gudang City Council), resulted in the current city limit of 373.18 square kilometres (144.09 sq mi).

=== MBJB Tower ===
On 1 January 2020, Johor Bahru City Council moved its headquarters to the new state-of-the-art 15-storey-tall MBJB Tower. It is located within Astaka Holdings Limited Group’s flagship mixed development, One Bukit Senyum in Plentong Mukim, just outside the City Centre and in front of The Astaka residential complex. The building has a gross floor area of approximately 442,810 square feet and 583 car park lots across 7 basements or lower ground floors, considered the deepest in Johor State with 28 metres of depth. It includes modern facilities mostly with smart technologies like a 300-capacity auditorium, a 1000-capacity hall, counters, a nursery for staff use and a cafeteria.

On 28 November 2016, MBJB acquired the site from Astaka Group's subsidiary–Astaka Padu Sdn Bhd with a cost of RM 308 million. Construction of MBJB Tower began on 3 April 2017 and was completed on 11 December 2019. The new building was launched by Sultan Ibrahim Iskandar on the 24th of March 2022.

While most of the City Council's offices, departments and units have moved to the new building, only the Law Enforcement, Health and Urban Transportation Departments still remain at the Jalan Dato Onn Building.

=== Symbols ===
Flag of Johor Bahru City Council, and by extension, the City of Johor Bahru

Since its establishment on 1 January 1994, the city council's flag and emblem (or coat of arms, officially called a "crest" in English and "Jata" in Malay) serve as its important visual identity.

The council's flag is the only local government flag in Johor that do not display its emblem. It consists of three equal horizontal bands of red, white and blue, with a yellow crescent and star in the middle of the white band similar to flag of Labuan. The yellow crescent and star represents Islam as the city's official religion, red represents the city's prosperity and progress, blue represents the city council's role in servicing and developing the city and white represents harmony and unity of the city's populace.

The council's emblem is the first local authority emblem in Johor State to bear semblance to the state's coat of arms. It consists of a shield in the form of a blue scroll (representing urban planning) charged with two wreaths of black pepper and gambir as the state's main agricultural products at the top, while at the bottom there is a circle containing Johor state banner, buildings and gear (or cogwheel) to represent Johor Bahru as the centre of trade, industry, tourism, culture and education and capital city. The shield is supported by two Johor State arms tigers on both sides and was topped by a yellow star and crescent in the original version, later replaced by the Johor Royal Crown in the 2019 version. Below the shield is a blue ribbon written with the council's motto – Berkhidmat, Berbudaya, Berwawasan (برخدمت، بربوديا، برواوسن, meaning Service, Cultured, Visionary) in Jawi Malay and the city's name in Romanised Malay – Bandaraya Johor Bahru (City of Johor Bahru).

=== Mayors of Johor Bahru (Datuk Bandar) ===
#	Name of Mayors	Term start	Term end
1.	Dato' Hashim Yahya	1 January 1994	5 September 2000
2.	Datuk Johari Suratman	6 September 2000	21 February 2003
3.	Datuk Wahid Dahlan	22 February 2003	21 February 2006
4.	Dato' Dato' Haji Abdul Latiff Yusof	22 February 2006	31 October 2006
5.	Dato' Naim Nasir	1 November 2006	31 July 2009
6.	Haji Mohd Jaffar Awang	1 August 2009	7 August 2011
7.	Haji Burhan Amin	8 August 2011	2 June 2013
8.	Dato' Haji Ismail Karim	3 June 2013	13 April 2014
9.	Dato' Haji Abdul Rahman Mohamed Dewam	21 April 2014	15 August 2015
10.	Haji A. Rahim Bin Haji Nin	16 August 2015	22 October 2017
11.	Dato’ Haji Amran bin A Rahman	23 October 2017	14 November 2019
12.	Dato’ Haji Azhari bin Daud	17 November 2019	14 August 2021
13.	Dato’ Haji Mohd Noorazam bin Dato' Haji Osman	15 August 2021	2 January 2025
14.	Dato’ Haji Mohd Haffiz bin Haji Ahmad	3 January 2025	Present

== Organisation chart ==
=== Mayor of Johor Bahru (Datuk Bandar) ===
Dato’ Haji Mohd Haffiz bin Haji Ahmad

=== Secretary ===
Haji Mohd Farid bin Hassan

=== Deputy Secretary ===
Hajah Nazatul Shima bt Mohamad

== Departments ==
- Management Services (Khidmat Pengurusan)
- Treasury (Perbendaharaan)
- Valuation (Penilaian)
- Development Planning (Perancangan Pembangunan)
- Engineering (Kejuruteraan)
- Building (Bangunan)
- Community Development (Pembangunan Masyarakat)
- Health (Kesihatan)
- Licensing (Pelesenan)
- Urban Transportation (Pengangkutan Bandar)
- Landscape (Landskap)
- Enforcement (Penguatkuasaan)
- Property Management (Pengurusan Harta)
- Information Technology (Teknologi Maklumat)

== Units ==
- Law (Undang-undang)
- Internal Audit (Audit Dalam)
- Integrity and Administration Modernisation (Integriti dan Permodenan Pentadbiran)
- Corporate & Public Relations (Korporat & Perhubungan Awam)
- One Stop Centre (Pusat Sehenti)
- Smart City (Bandar Pintar)

== Branch ==
- Commissioner of Building (Pesuruhjaya Bangunan)

== Administration areas (zones) ==
As of 2025, Johor Bahru is divided into 24 zones represented by 24 councillors to act as mediators between residents and the city council. The councillors for the 1 April 2024 to 31 December 2025 session are as below:

Zone	Councillor	Political affiliation
Desa Cemerlang	A Aziz Ahmad	UMNO
Bandar Baru UDA	Yahya Jaafar	UMNO
Kempas	Abd Rashid Kasman	UMNO
Mount Austin	Ng Yew Aik	MCA
Taman Abad/Wadi Hana	G Jayasilan Gopal	MIC
Bakar Batu	Abu Talib Alias	UMNO
Permas Jaya/Teluk Jawa	Abdul Latiff Ismail	UMNO
Danga Bay (Teluk Danga)	Pannir Selvam	MIC
Taman Johor Jaya/Taman Rinting	Chan San San	MCA
City Centre (Bandar)	Syeikh Ahmad Nafiq AlFirdaous	UMNO
Setia Austin	Teow Chia Ling	MCA
Desa Harmoni	Mohd Khairul Azlan Sulong	UMNO
Austin Duta	You Jeat Xiong	MCA
Stulang	Bong Seng Heng	MCA
Taman Molek	Chong See Ming	MCA
Majidee Malay Village/Taman Suria	Mohamad Isamuddin Mohamad Isa	UMNO
Larkin	Abdul Gafar Sudin	UMNO
Tiram	Fauzi Faizal	UMNO
Bandar Dato' Onn/Kangkar Tebrau	Siti Khairunnisa Ruslan	UMNO
Taman Daya	Nordin Omar	UMNO
Pelangi Indah	Fadilah Suradi	UMNO
Taman Pelangi/Taman Sentosa	Ng Lied Ying	MCA
Kebun Teh	Ngoh Wei Ching	MCA
Tampoi	Ahmad Al Mubarak Mohamed Kunyi	UMNO

== Branch office ==
- Former Headquarters Jalan Dato Onn
- Larkin
- Taman Johor Jaya
- Taman Pelangi
- Stulang
- Permas Jaya
- Bandar Baru UDA
- Tampoi
- UTC Johor

== See also ==
- Iskandar Puteri City Council
- Pasir Gudang City Council
