= Bukit Indah Highway =

Road in Malaysia

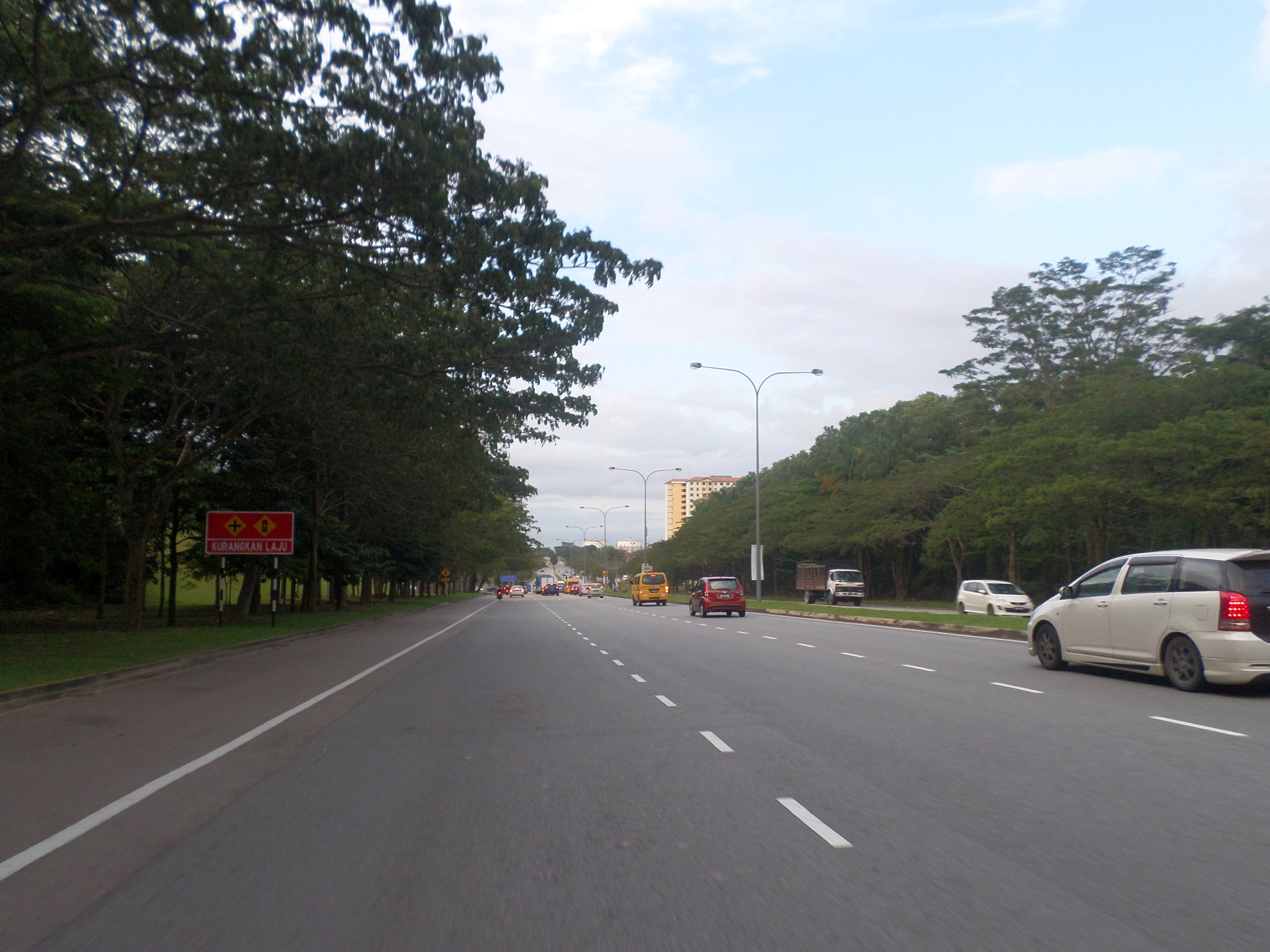

Route information
- Length: 5 km (3.1 mi)

Major junctions
- North end: Bukit Indah-LINKEDUA Interchange Second Link Expressway (Pontian–Johor Bahru Parkway) / AH143

- Second Link Expressway (Pontian–Johor Bahru Parkway) / AH143; FT 52 Iskandar Coastal Highway
- South end: Bukit Indah (South) Interchange; FT 52 Iskandar Coastal Highway

Location
- Country: Malaysia
- Primary destinations: Bukit Indah, Horizon Hills

Highway system
- Highways in Malaysia; Expressways; Federal; State

Bukit Indah Highway (Malay: Lebuhraya Bukit Indah) is a major highway in Johor Bahru District, Johor, Malaysia.

== Junction lists ==
The entire route is located in Johor Bahru District, Johor.

Legend:

- I/C - Interchange, I/S - Intersection, RSA - Rest and service area, OBR - Overhead bridge restaurant, R/R - Restaurant and rest plaza, L/B - Layby, V/P - Vista point, TN - tunnel, T/P - Toll plaza, BR - Bridge
- C - Cloverleaf, S - Stack, T-A - Trumpet-A, T-B - Trumpet-B, DT - Directional-T/Y, SDT - Semi-Directional-T/Y, P-Y - Partial-Y, D - Diamond, P-C - Partial cloverleaf, D-D - Diverging diamond, D-R - Direct ramp

Location	km	mi	Name	Destinations	Notes
Bukit Indah			Bukit Indah-Linkedua I/C	Second Link Expressway (Pontian–Johor Bahru Parkway) / AH143 – Iskandar Puteri, Senai International Airport, Gelang Patah, Pontian, Port of Tanjung Pelepas, Tuas (Singapore), Kuala Lumpur, Perling, Johor Bahru, Bandar Sri Alam, Pasir Gudang, Kota Tinggi	Trumpet interchange
Bukit Indah			Bukit Indah; Persiaran Indah	Persiaran Indah – Taman Nusa Indah, Skudai, Other Townships	Junctions
Bukit Indah			Bukit Indah 2 Persiaran Indah Utama	Persiaran Indah Utama – Taman Nusa Indah	Junctions
Bukit Indah			Jalan Persiaran Timur	Jalan Persiaran Timur – Horizon Hills	T-junctions
Bukit Indah			Horizon Hills I/C	FT 52 Iskandar Coastal Highway – Iskandar Puteri, Gelang Patah, Pontian, Port of Tanjung Pelepas, Tuas (Singapore), Kota Iskandar, Legoland Malaysia, Perling, Johor Bahru, Woodlands (Singapore), Tampoi, Skudai, Danga Bay, Riveria Garden (Under construction), Proposed International Destination Resort (Under construction)	Cloverleaf interchange
1.000 mi = 1.609 km; 1.000 km = 0.621 mi: Unopened
