= Johor Bahru City Square (town square) =

Public square in Johor Bahru, Johor, Malaysia

Coordinates: 1°27′37.3″N 103°44′31.6″E

- Dataran Bandaraya Johor Bahru
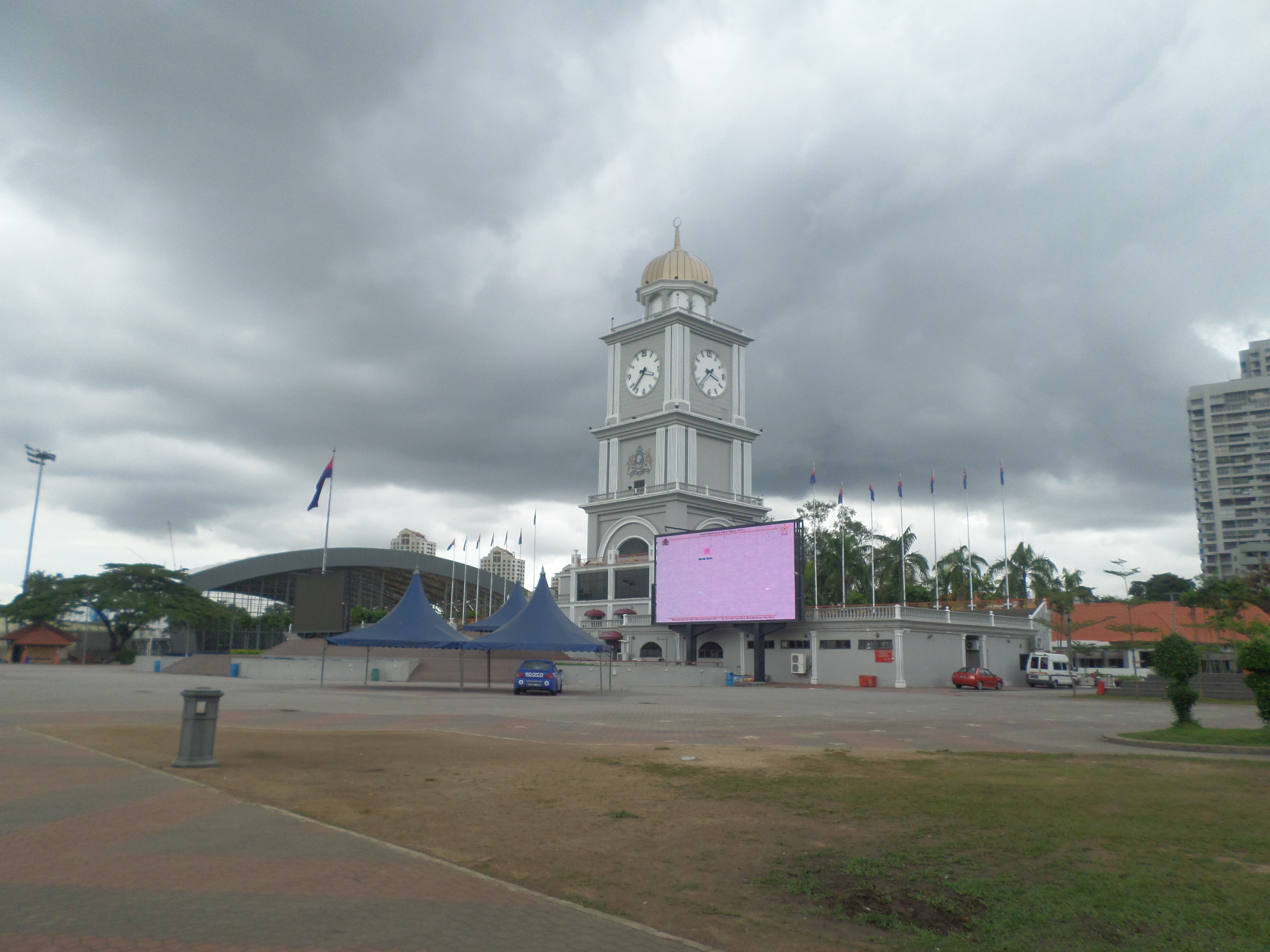
- Johor Bahru City Square clock tower with its new coat of paint in grey since 2015, previously coloured gold.
- Interactive map of the Johor Bahru City Square area

General information
- Type: Town square
- Location: Johor Bahru, Johor, Malaysia
- Completed: 1 January 1994
- Owner: Johor Bahru City Council

Johor Bahru City Square (Malay: Dataran Bandaraya Johor Bahru) is the main square of Johor Bahru, Johor, Malaysia. It was completed on 1 January 1994, the day Johor Bahru was declared as a city, costing around MYR 10 million to build.

The city square features a 51-metre-tall clock tower, a 31-metre-tall flag pole, a big field and two giant LED television screens imported from Japan and costing MYR 2.2 million to install. Its design is said to resemble a combination of Sultan Ibrahim Building (then the State Secretariat Building of Johor) and the Sultan Abu Bakar State Mosque.

== Activities ==
The square is often used for official events, as well as sport competitions. At night, the area turns into an eatery area.

== See also ==
- List of tourist attractions in Johor
