= Osman Sapian =

Malaysian politician (1951–2021)

Yang Berhormat Dato' Osman Sapian SPMJ DSNS AMN PIS
- عثمان سفيان

16th Menteri Besar of Johor
- In office 12 May 2018 – 14 April 2019
- Monarch: Ibrahim Iskandar
- Preceded by: Mohamed Khaled Nordin
- Succeeded by: Sahruddin Jamal

Faction represented in Johor State Legislative Assembly
- 1999–2013: Barisan Nasional
- 2018–2020: Pakatan Harapan
- 2020: Malaysian United Indigenous Party
- 2020–2021: Perikatan Nasional

Personal details
- Born: Osman bin Sapian; 25 December 1951 Segamat, Johor, Federation of Malaya (now Malaysia)
- Died: 21 December 2021 (aged 69) Damansara, Selangor
- Resting place: Ar-Raudhah Muslim Cemetery, Mount Austin, Johor Bahru
- Citizenship: Malaysian
- Party: United Malays National Organisation (UMNO) (–2016); Malaysian United Indigenous Party (BERSATU) (2016–2021)
- Other political affiliations: Barisan Nasional (BN) (until 2016); Pakatan Harapan (PH) (2016–2020); Perikatan Nasional (PN) (2020–2021)
- Occupation: Politician
- Website: Osman Sapian on Facebook

Osman bin Sapian (Jawi: عثمان بن سفيان; 25 December 1951 – 21 December 2021) was a Malaysian politician who served as the 16th Menteri Besar of Johor from May 2018 to his resignation in April 2019 and Member of the Johor State Legislative Assembly (MLA) for Kempas twice from November 1999 to May 2013 and from May 2018 to his death in December 2021. He was a member of the Malaysian United Indigenous Party (BERSATU), a component party of the Perikatan Nasional (PN) and formerly Pakatan Harapan (PH) coalitions. He is also the second shortest-serving Menteri Besar of Johor after Sahruddin Jamal, serving in the position for only 328 days.

== Politics ==
Osman contested the 1978 by election in the federal seat of Pontian for Parti Rakyat Malaysia. Subsequently, he joined UMNO and was elected to the Johor State Legislative Assembly in 1999.

Prior to joining BERSATU during its formation in 2016, he was a member and MLA of the United Malays National Organisation (UMNO), a component party of the ruling Barisan Nasional (BN) coalition before he was dropped as the BN candidate in the 2013 general election.

In the 2018 general election (GE14), he contested and regained the Kempas state seat but as an opposition Pakatan Harapan (PH) candidate for the first time and was appointed the new first Johor Menteri Besar from BERSATU when PH won the GE14 afterwards. In April 2019, Osman resigned from office 11 months after leading the state.

== Controversy ==
=== Education Credentials ===
Osman Sapian courted controversy when his academic qualification listed on the government portal included a bachelor's degree from Universiti Putra Malaysia. Upon investigation, it was found that he did not graduate from the university and had dropped out. Osman later clarified that it was a mistake and that he had never claimed to have graduated. His distorted academic credentials on all state government websites were taken down later.

=== Malaysia-Singapore disputed waters boat ride and visit ===
In January 2019, as the Johor Menteri Besar, Osman made a boat ride to visit a Malaysian Marine Department vessel that was anchored in Malaysia-Singapore disputed waters which had raised protest from Singapore. In response to his visit, Singapore's Minister for Foreign Affairs Dr Vivian Balakrishnan said in a ministerial statement in Parliament that both sides must act in "good faith" to overcome bilateral issues.

=== Batam visit amid Kim Kim River toxic crisis ===
Osman had visited Batam Island, Riau, Indonesia in March 2019 amid the toxic pollution crisis of Kim Kim River, Pasir Gudang, Johor. He explained that it was working visit that was preplanned for the preparations of the visit to Johor in 2020 year and had been shortened from 3 days to 1 day trip. Osman had been blamed for neglecting the urgent matter at home as a state government chief.

=== Resignation as Chief Minister of Johor ===
On 8 April 2019, Osman tendered his resignation as Menteri Besar of Johor. The Johor Sultan officially accepted Osman's resignation on 13 April 2019. The Menteri Besar role, also known as the Chief Minister, is the highest political position in the State of Johor. The position is traditionally nominated by the Prime Minister of Malaysia who commands the majority of state legislators. The nominee is then approved and officially appointed by the Sultan of Johor.

Tun Dr. Mahathir Mohamad, the Prime Minister of Malaysia, was known to be unhappy with Osman Sapian following several decisions that he had made against the federal government's direction.

His resignation came amidst a public disagreement between the royal family of Johor and Tun Dr Mahathir, the Prime Minister of Malaysia.

On 4 September, his BERSATU membership was voided with immediate effect after he was spotted stumping for Dr. Mahathir's new Homeland Fighters' Party (PEJUANG) during the 2020 Slim by-election campaign period. However at same time Bersatu Secretary-General Hamzah Zainudin said, Osman Sapian still remained a member of BERSATU as Osman would only be called to explain regardining allegations of helping the Independent candidate campaign in the by-election, and no action has yet been taken.

== Personal life and death ==
On 13 October 2021, Osman was admitted to the KPJ Johor Specialist Hospital after suffering a mild stroke. Osman died on 21 December 2021 at the age of 69 in Damansara from the complications of the stroke he suffer earlier four days before his 70th birthday. He was buried at the Ar-Raudhah Muslim Cemetery in Mount Austin, Johor Bahru.

== Election results ==
Johor State Legislative Assembly
Year	Constituency	Candidate	Votes	Pct	Opponent(s)	Votes	Pct	Ballots cast	Majority	Turnout
1999	N36 Kempas	Osman Sapian (UMNO)	21,178	73.57%	Mohidin Yahya Shamsudin (PAS)	6,890	23.94%	28,785	14,288	69.46%
2004	N47 Kempas	Osman Sapian (UMNO)	19,088	84.30%	Ibrahim Masran (PAS)	3,170	14.00%	22,644	15,918	72.24%
2008	N47 Kempas	Osman Sapian (UMNO)	15,897	65.96%	Suhaizan Kayat (PAS)	7,711	31.99%	24,102	8,186	73.13%
2018	N47 Kempas	Osman Sapian (BERSATU)	21,137	48.70%	Ramlee Bohani (UMNO)	11,959	27.60%	35,883	9,178	82.70%
2018	N47 Kempas	Osman Sapian (BERSATU)	21,137	48.70%	Dzulkifli Suleiman (PAS)	2,321	5.40%	35,883	9,178	82.70%

== Honours ==
=== Honours of Malaysia ===
- Malaysia
  - Member of the Order of the Defender of the Realm (AMN) (1998)
- Johor
  - Knight Grand Commander of the Order of the Crown of Johor (SPMJ) – Dato' (2018)
  - Silver Medal of the Sultan Ibrahim Medal (PIS II) (1999)
- Negeri Sembilan
  - Knight Companion of the Order of Loyalty to Negeri Sembilan (DSNS) – Dato' (2007)

== See also ==
- Kempas (state constituency)

Political offices
Preceded by Mohamed Khaled Nordin	16th Menteri Besar of Johor; 2018–2019	Succeeded by Sahruddin Jamal
