= Mount Austin =

Mount Austin may refer to:

- Mount Austin (Antarctica), a mountain
- Mount Austin (Hong Kong), a hill also known as Victoria Peak
- Mount Austin, Johor Bahru, a residential area in Johor Bahru, Johor, Malaysia
- Mount Austin, New South Wales, a suburb of Wagga Wagga
- SS Mount Austin, a British steamship
