= Johor State Route J106 =

Road in Malaysia

Johor Route 106
- Jalan Sungai Danga

Major junctions
- West end: Perling
- Jalan Pesisiran Perling 1 Jalan Persisiran Perling 2 FT 52 Iskandar Coastal Highway
- East end: Sungai Danga

Location
- Country: Malaysia
- Primary destinations: Kampung Sungai Danga

Highway system
- Highways in Malaysia; Expressways; Federal; State

Johor State Route J106, Jalan Sungai Danga is a major road in Johor, Malaysia.

== Features ==
=== Overlaps ===
- FT52 Iskandar Coastal Highway (Perling–Danga)

== Junction lists ==
The entire route is located in Johor Bahru District, Johor.

Legend:

- I/C - Interchange, I/S - Intersection, RSA - Rest and service area, OBR - Overhead bridge restaurant, R/R - Restaurant and rest plaza, L/B - Layby, V/P - Vista point, TN - tunnel, T/P - Toll plaza, BR - Bridge
- C - Cloverleaf, S - Stack, T-A - Trumpet-A, T-B - Trumpet-B, DT - Directional-T/Y, SDT - Semi-Directional-T/Y, P-Y - Partial-Y, D - Diamond, P-C - Partial cloverleaf, D-D - Diverging diamond, D-R - Direct ramp

Location	km	mi	Name	Destinations	Notes
Danga			Perling - Danga	see also FT 52 Iskandar Coastal Highway	
Danga			Danga Interchange	FT 52 Iskandar Coastal Highway – Tampoi, Johor Bahru, Woodlands (Singapore), Danga Bay	Interchange
Danga			Kampung Sungai Danga		
Danga			Sungai Danga	Sungai Danga – Perkampungan Orang Asli Sungai Danga, Restoran Sungai Danga Seafood	
1.000 mi = 1.609 km; 1.000 km = 0.621 mi: Concurrency terminus
