= Kempas (state constituency) =

Political subdivision in Malaysia

Coordinates: 1.528°N 103.7050°E

Kempas (N47)
Johor constituency

State constituency
- Legislature: Johor State Legislative Assembly
MLA
Ramlee Bohani
BN
- Constituency created: 1994
- First contested: 1995
- Last contested: 2026

Demographics
- Population (2020): 102,118
- Electors (2026): 64,244
- Area (km²): 21

Kempas is a state constituency in Johor, Malaysia, that is represented in the Johor State Legislative Assembly.

The state constituency was first contested in 1995 and is mandated to return a single Assemblyman to the Johor State Legislative Assembly under the first-past-the-post voting system.

== Demographics ==
As of 2020, Kempas has a population of 102,118 people.

Ethnic breakdown of Kempas's electorate as of 2026
1. Malay (56.9%)
2. Chinese (29.4%)
3. Indian (10.8%)
4. Other ethnicities (2.80%)

== History ==
=== Polling districts ===
According to the gazette issued on 2 July 2026, the Kempas constituency has a total of 14 polling districts.

State constituency	Polling districts	Code	Location
Kempas（N47）	Kempas	161/47/01	SMK Tan Sri Mohamed Rahmat
Kempas（N47）	Permatang	161/47/02	SA Kempas Baru
Kempas（N47）	Lembah Kempas	161/47/03	SK Kempas
Kempas（N47）	Jalan Tampoi	161/47/04	SK Taman Damansara Aliff
Kempas（N47）	Denai	161/47/05	SK Seri Kenanga
Kempas（N47）	Taman Siantan	161/47/06	SK Perumahan Tampoi 2
Kempas（N47）	Taman Johor	161/47/07	SMK Sri Rahmat; SA Taman Dahlia
Kempas（N47）	Taman Cempaka	161/47/08	SA Taman Cempaka; SK Taman Cempaka
Kempas（N47）	Taman Dahlia	161/47/09	SK Seri Melati
Kempas（N47）	Taman Kobena	161/47/10	SA Perumahan MARA
Kempas（N47）	Desa Rahmat	161/47/11	SMK Dato Abdul Rahman Yassin
Kempas（N47）	Pekan Tampoi	162/47/12	SJK (C) Tampoi
Kempas（N47）	Bukit Mewah	162/47/13	SK Taman Bukit Mewah; SA Taman Bukit Mewah
Kempas（N47）	Bukit Kempas	162/47/14	SK Taman Bukit Kempas; SA Taman Anggerik

=== Representation history ===
Members of the Legislative Assembly for Kempas
Assembly	No	Years	Member	Party
Constituency created from Kulai, Gelang Patah dan Tambatan
9th	N36	1995-1999	Abdul Kadir Annuar	BN (UMNO)
10th	N36	1999-2004	Osman Sapian	BN (UMNO)
11th	N47	2004-2008	Osman Sapian	BN (UMNO)
12th	N47	2008-2013	Osman Sapian	BN (UMNO)
13th	N47	2013-2018	Tengku Putra Haron Aminurrashid Tengku Hamid Jumat	BN (UMNO)
14th	N47	2018-2020	Osman Sapian	PH (BERSATU)
14th	N47	2020-2021	Osman Sapian	PN (BERSATU)
14th	N47	2021-2022	Vacant (Note: Vacant from 21 December 2021 until the 2022 state election due to the incumbent died in office. His death eventually triggered the state to held it's election much earlier due to the term supposedly end in mid-2023.)	
15th	N47	2022–2026	Ramlee Bohani	BN (UMNO)
16th	N47	2026–present	Ramlee Bohani	BN (UMNO)

== Election results ==
Johor state election, 2026
Party	Candidate	Votes	%	∆%
BN	Ramlee Bohani	28,146	65.22	▲26.30
PH	Mohd Faezuddin Puad	13,193	30.57	▲3.13
BERSAMA	Salamahafifi Yusnaieny	1,817	4.21	▲4.21
Total valid votes		43,156	100.00	
Total rejected ballots		504		
Unreturned ballots		35		
Turnout		43,695	68.01	▲17.61
Registered electors		64,244		
Majority		14,953	34.65	▲23.18
BN hold		Swing		?

Johor state election, 2022
Party	Candidate	Votes	%	∆%
BN	Ramlee Bohani	11,919	38.92	▲5.15
PH	Napsiah Khamis	8,405	27.44	▲27.44
PN	Nur Faizal Abdullah	8,036	26.24	▲26.24
PEJUANG	Nornekman Osman	1,358	4.33	▲4.33
Independent	Tok Hambali	480	1.57	▲1.57
Independent	Azwan Abd Rahman	271	0.88	▲0.88
Independent	Mohd Suhaimi A Rahman	158	0.52	▲0.52
Total valid votes		30,627	100.00	
Total rejected ballots		392		
Unreturned ballots		235		
Turnout		31,254	50.40	▼32.33
Registered electors		62,011		
Majority		3,514	11.47	▼14.44
BN gain from PKR		Swing		?

Johor state election, 2018
Party	Candidate	Votes	%	∆%
PKR	Osman Sapian	21,137	59.68	▲59.68
BN	Ramlee Bohani	11,959	33.77	▼22.17
PAS	Dzulkifli Suleiman	2,321	6.55	▼37.51
Total valid votes		35,417	100.00	
Total rejected ballots		350		
Unreturned ballots		116		
Turnout		35,883	82.73	▼3.62
Registered electors		43,373		
Majority		9,178	25.91	▲14.04
PKR gain from BN		Swing		-

Johor state election, 2013
Party	Candidate	Votes	%	∆%
BN	Tengku Putra Haron Aminurrashid Tengku Hamid Jumat	18,595	55.94	▼11.40
PAS	Suhaizan Kaiat	14,648	44.06	▲11.40
Total valid votes		33,243	100.00	
Total rejected ballots		594		
Unreturned ballots		74		
Turnout		33,911	86.35	▲13.22
Registered electors		39,273		
Majority		3,947	11.87	▼22.80
BN hold		Swing		

Johor state election, 2008
Party	Candidate	Votes	%	∆%
BN	Osman Sapian	15,897	67.34	▼18.42
PAS	Suhaizan Kaiat	7,711	32.66	▲18.42
Total valid votes		23,608	100.00	
Total rejected ballots		439		
Unreturned ballots		55		
Turnout		24,102	73.13	▲0.89
Registered electors		32,958		
Majority		8,186	34.67	▼36.84
BN hold		Swing		

Johor state election, 2004
Party	Candidate	Votes	%	∆%
BN	Osman Sapian	19,088	85.76	▲10.31
PAS	Ibrahim Masan	3,170	14.24	▼10.31
Total valid votes		22,258	100.00	
Total rejected ballots		370		
Unreturned ballots		16		
Turnout		22,644	72.24	▲2.78
Registered electors		31,347		
Majority		15,918	71.52	▲20.61
BN hold		Swing		

Johor state election, 1999
Party	Candidate	Votes	%	∆%
BN	Osman Sapian	21,178	75.45	▼9.75
PAS	Mohidin Yahya Shamsudin	6,890	24.55	▲24.55
Total valid votes		28,068	100.00	
Total rejected ballots		630		
Unreturned ballots		87		
Turnout		28,785	69.46	▼4.24
Registered electors		41,441		
Majority		14,288	50.90	▼19.51
BN hold		Swing		

Johor state election, 1995
Party	Candidate	Votes	%
BN	Abdul Kadir Annuar	23,247	85.21
S46	Ishak Talib	4,036	14.79
Total valid votes		27,283	100.00
Total rejected ballots		613	
Unreturned ballots		137	
Turnout		28,033	73.70
Registered electors		38,037	
Majority		19,211	70.41
This was a new constituency created.
