= 2019 Kim Kim River toxic pollution =

Water contamination event in Malaysia

- 2019 Kim Kim River toxic pollution (Malaysia)
- Date: 7 March 2019; 7 years ago
- Location: Kim Kim River, Pasir Gudang, Johor, Malaysia; 1.464548°N 103.939289°E
- Cause: Discharge of 2.43 tonnes of chemical substances from an oil tanker
- Injuries: 6,000 people affected; 2,775 victims received immediate treatment, 8 were treated in Intensive Care Unit (ICU)
- Suspects: Two factory owners and one worker aged around 40 to 50 years old

The 2019 Kim Kim River toxic pollution was a water pollution incident that occurred on 7 March 2019 as a result of illegal chemical waste dumping into the Kim Kim River in Pasir Gudang, Johor, Malaysia. The illegal dumping released toxic fumes, affecting 6,000 people and hospitalising 2,775. Most of the victims were school students—110 schools located near the river were subsequently closed.

== Background of pollution ==
The incident started on 7 March 2019 after several students and canteen workers from two schools near the river began to fall ill and complaining of breathing difficulties. Both schools were ordered to shut down and all the victims were sent to Sultan Ismail Hospital while investigations were being carried out by state health authorities over the cause. Twenty-one people were warded at the hospital with some being admitted into the emergency unit and intensive care unit (ICU). Some of the students brought to the hospital were already fainted and with symptoms such as vomiting. Those who were not seriously affected were given outpatient treatment and allowed to return home. During recovery, some of the seriously affected victims shared their experience of suddenly being ill after inhaling unpleasant odour in their school compound. The number of victims hospitalised over the toxic fumes rose to 76 on the following day and on 9 March 2019, five police reports have been made on the issue with police began investigating the case.

=== Further spread of toxic fumes and water pollution ===
On 11 March, the second wave of air poisoning took effect with further 106–207 victims hospitalised before escalating into more than 1,000 victims with eight admitted into the ICU. The spread of the toxic fumes was aided by hot weather combined with strong winds, which made more people sick. The Malaysian Fire and Rescue Department director-general Mohammad Hamdan Wahid explained that the further spread of toxic fumes could have been prevented if the illegally dumped chemicals found earlier were immediately removed. However, the authorities did not dispose the chemicals after concluding it was no longer reactive, allegedly due to the costs involved. Until 19 March, further 76 police reports have been made. On 20 June, about 3 months since the pollution first discovered, a number of students from schools in the Pasir Gudang area began complaining of nausea, dizziness and experienced vomiting which eventually led to the temporary closure of the schools in the area. The authorities later confirmed it as the third wave of air poisoning resulted from the river pollution, which were not fully cleared.

In August 2019, residents in Acheh's Well Village near the Daing and Kopok rivers (tributaries to the Kim Kim River) complained that the water in both rivers have turned black and oily with unbearable foul stench which were believed to have spread from the chemical pollution of the Kim Kim River. A resident interviewed on the issue said the rivers were once homes to various crabs, freshwater fish and shrimps with children used to swim in, but everything has been damaged since the pollution turned worse in April.

== Investigation, clearance works and arrestment of perpetrators ==
Through investigations, it was believed that the chemical wastes were dumped from a lorry tanker into the Kim Kim River in the early morning hours, on the same day before the victims fell ill. Agencies dispatched for the cleaning-up operation of the polluted river collected 2.43 tonnes of chemical waste on the day the incident was reported. The cleaning works, however, worsened the chemical reaction, as the contractor engaged was not experienced in dealing with chemical wastes. A chemical, biological, radiological and nuclear (CBRN) team from the 12th Squadron of the Royal Army Engineers Regiment of Malaysian Armed Forces was later dispatched to assist in the chemical cleaning efforts together with a Hazmat team.

The Johor Department of Environment (DOE) arrested an owner of a chemical factory in Kulai on 10 March followed by another arrest involving shredded waste factory owner and one of its workers in Taman Pasir Puteh on the following day after a series of investigations. With the arrests, the DOE completed its investigation papers and were sent to the public prosecutor for further action, with the investigators also have identified the illegally dumped chemical as marine oil that emitted flammable methane and benzene fumes. The oil is categorised as a scheduled waste and needs proper disposal due to its hazardous nature. On 17 March, nine more people were arrested by the police in connection to the case; two arrested in Johor Bahru while seven were arrested outside the Johor Bahru area. Two key suspects, believed to be instrumental in arranging for the transportation of the toxic substances, were arrested on 19 March, bringing the total arrests to 11 with one suspect later released under bail after he is proven to be unrelated to the case. The cleaning operation of the 1.5 kilometre stretch of the affected river was completed in the same day, where a total of 900 tonnes of soil and 1,500 tonnes of polluted water were cleaned.

Several other identified toxic gases emitted (following the interaction of the chemicals concerned with water and air) include acrolein, acrylonitrile, ethylbenzene, hydrogen chloride, D-limonene, toluene and xylene, which if inhaled, can cause headache, nausea, fainting and breathing difficulty. Two main suspects (a Singaporean and a Malaysian) were charged at the Sessions Court in Johor on 25 March for illegal disposal of chemicals into the river and their company, P Tech Resources was slapped with 15 charges to which they pleaded not guilty. Both have been charged earlier in the same court for conspiring with a lorry driver to dispose the scheduled wastes into the river.

== Government and health authorities response ==
Johor's Sultan Ibrahim Ismail urged for an immediate action against the perpetrators involved in this pollution that endangered public lives while expressing his appreciation for the medical teams which had been working tirelessly to treat the victims in hospital. The Sultan has pledged a total of RM1 million (around US$250,000) towards helping rescue agencies and authorities to gather the necessary means and equipment to resolve the matter, meanwhile expressing his view that the incident shows the need for a government hospital to be built in Pasir Gudang. Prime Minister Mahathir Mohamad and Deputy Prime Minister Wan Azizah Wan Ismail visited victims of the pollution at the hospital in Johor Bahru on 14 March, and said that the situation was "under control" where residents are not necessary to be evacuated from the area and also that there is a need to review the country's Environmental Quality Act 1974 in light of the serious pollution. The federal government has approved an allocation of RM8 million for river purification works and has ordered various agencies including the police, military and Hazmat teams to support the situation in the affected area. They explained that there was no request for a state of emergency received from the state government of Johor.

Johor's Menteri Besar Osman Sapian were in the opinion that the situation is under control without the need to declare a state of emergency in the area, with the state government having approved an emergency allocation of RM6.4 million for cleaning up the affected river. Malaysia's Environment Minister Yeo Bee Yin stressed that investigation will be carried out to bring those responsible to justice and explained that the RM6.4 million is mainly used to clear the 1.5 kilometre stretch of the affected river with further cost expected to balloon to over RM10 million. The state government also dismissed claims that its agencies were slow to react over the incident. The State Health Department had also warned the public not to circulate fake news, with an ongoing one saying deaths had been resulted from the pollution. On 1 June, Malaysia's Health Ministry formed a medical team, which consists of officers from the Institute for Medical Research and Johor Health Department, to examine a total of 6,000 victims affected by the pollution . Malaysia's Water, Land and Natural Resources Minister Xavier Jayakumar Arulanandam urged every state governments to take serious measures to overcome river pollution as climate change could cause the country to experience long periods of drought in the future. The ministry also drafted a Water Resources Bill to clamp down on water pollution.

Neighbouring authorities in Singapore continue to monitor the situation following the reports of more illegal waste dumping sites found in Pasir Gudang. Various Singapore agencies have been conducting regular checks with a minister explained that they were taking the matter very seriously as what happened in Malaysia can affect Singapore significantly.

=== Criticism of government response and lawsuits ===
Johor's Crown Prince Tunku Ismail Idris took the matter to Twitter to express his opinion that the government should have instead declared a state of emergency on the day it first occurred and relocated residents to a temporary place until there was a guarantee that the area was safe. Malaysian Chinese Association (MCA) Deputy President Mah Hang Soon said that the incompetent preventive measures escalated the hazard levels in the involved area. In July 2019, a boy was reported to have developed Parkinson's-like disease of myokymia after being exposed to the pollution, although this was denied by Malaysia's Deputy Health Minister Lee Boon Chye who said that the boy was born premature and had a history of fits since he was four. A group of 160 victims of the pollution then began to file a suit and taking the Johor Menteri Besar along with the state government to court to seek monetary compensation for the boy and other damages caused by the illegal dumping of toxic chemicals.

=== Other responses ===
A chemical company Lotte Chemical Titan Holdings Bhd had denied rumours that they are involved in the pollution of Kim Kim River. In a statement to Bursa Malaysia, Lotte Chemical Titan stated in detail: "The company hereby denies rumours and wishes to announce that it has no involvement with the incident". Malaysian singer Indah Ruhaila expressed concern over the incident as her parents live in the affected area where she also persuaded her parents to leave their homes, worrying of the reoccurrence of the incident.

== See also ==
- Water pollution
- Chernobyl disaster
- Bhopal disaster
