= Ramlee Bohani =

Malaysian politician

Yang Berhormat Datuk Haji Ramlee Bohani MLA DPSM AMN JMN
- رملي بوهاني

Member of the Johor State Legislative Assembly for Kempas
- Incumbent
- Assumed office 2022
- Preceded by: Osman Sapian

Personal details
- Born: Ramlee bin Bohani
- Citizenship: Malaysian
- Party: UMNO
- Other political affiliations: Barisan Nasional
- Occupation: Politician

Ramlee bin Bohani is a Malaysian politician from UMNO. He has served as the Member of the Johor State Legislative Assembly for Kempas since 2022.

== Politics ==
Ramlee is the Political Secretary for Onn Hafiz Ghazi, Menteri Besar of Johor.

== Election results ==
Johor State Legislative Assembly
Year	Constituency	Candidate	Votes	Pct.	Opponent(s)	Votes	Pct.	Ballots cast	Majority	Turnout
2018	N47 Kempas	Ramlee Bohani (UMNO)	11,959	33.77%	Osman Sapian (BERSATU)	21,137	59.68%	35,883	9,178	82.73%
2018	N47 Kempas	Ramlee Bohani (UMNO)	11,959	33.77%	Dzulkifli Suleiman (PAS)	2,321	6.55%	35,883	9,178	82.73%
2022	N47 Kempas	Ramlee Bohani (UMNO)	11,919	38.92%	Napsiah Khamis (PKR)	8,405	27.44%	31,254	3,514	50.40%
2022	N47 Kempas	Ramlee Bohani (UMNO)	11,919	38.92%	Nur Faizal Abdullah (BERSATU)	8,036	26.24%	31,254	3,514	50.40%
2022	N47 Kempas	Ramlee Bohani (UMNO)	11,919	38.92%	Nornekman Osman (PEJUANG)	1,358	4.33%	31,254	3,514	50.40%
2022	N47 Kempas	Ramlee Bohani (UMNO)	11,919	38.92%	Mohd Hambali Munadi (IND)	480	1.57%	31,254	3,514	50.40%
2022	N47 Kempas	Ramlee Bohani (UMNO)	11,919	38.92%	Azwan Abd Rahman (IND)	271	0.88%	31,254	3,514	50.40%
2022	N47 Kempas	Ramlee Bohani (UMNO)	11,919	38.92%	Mohd Suhaimi A Rahman (IND)	158	0.52%	31,254	3,514	50.40%

== Honours ==
- Malaysia
  - Member of the Order of the Defender of the Realm (AMN) (2007)
  - Companion of the Order of the Defender of the Realm (JMN) (2009)
- Malacca
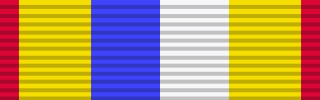
  - Companion Class II of the Order of Malacca (DPSM) - Datuk (2015)
