= Johor Bahru (disambiguation) =

Johor Bahru is the capital city of the state of Johor in Malaysia.

Johor Bahru may also refer to:

- Johor Bahru's downtown, otherwise known as Johor Bahru Central Business District.
- Johor Bahru District, an administrative district within the state of Johor, which has no jurisdiction over the city but simply administers land rights.
- SS Johore Bahru, the former British cargo ship
- Johor Bahru (federal constituency), the federal constituency represented in the Dewan Rakyat
