= Sultan Abu Bakar State Mosque =

Mosque in Johor Bahru, Johor, Malaysia

- Masjid Negeri Sultan Abu Bakar مسجد نڬري سلطان ابو بكر
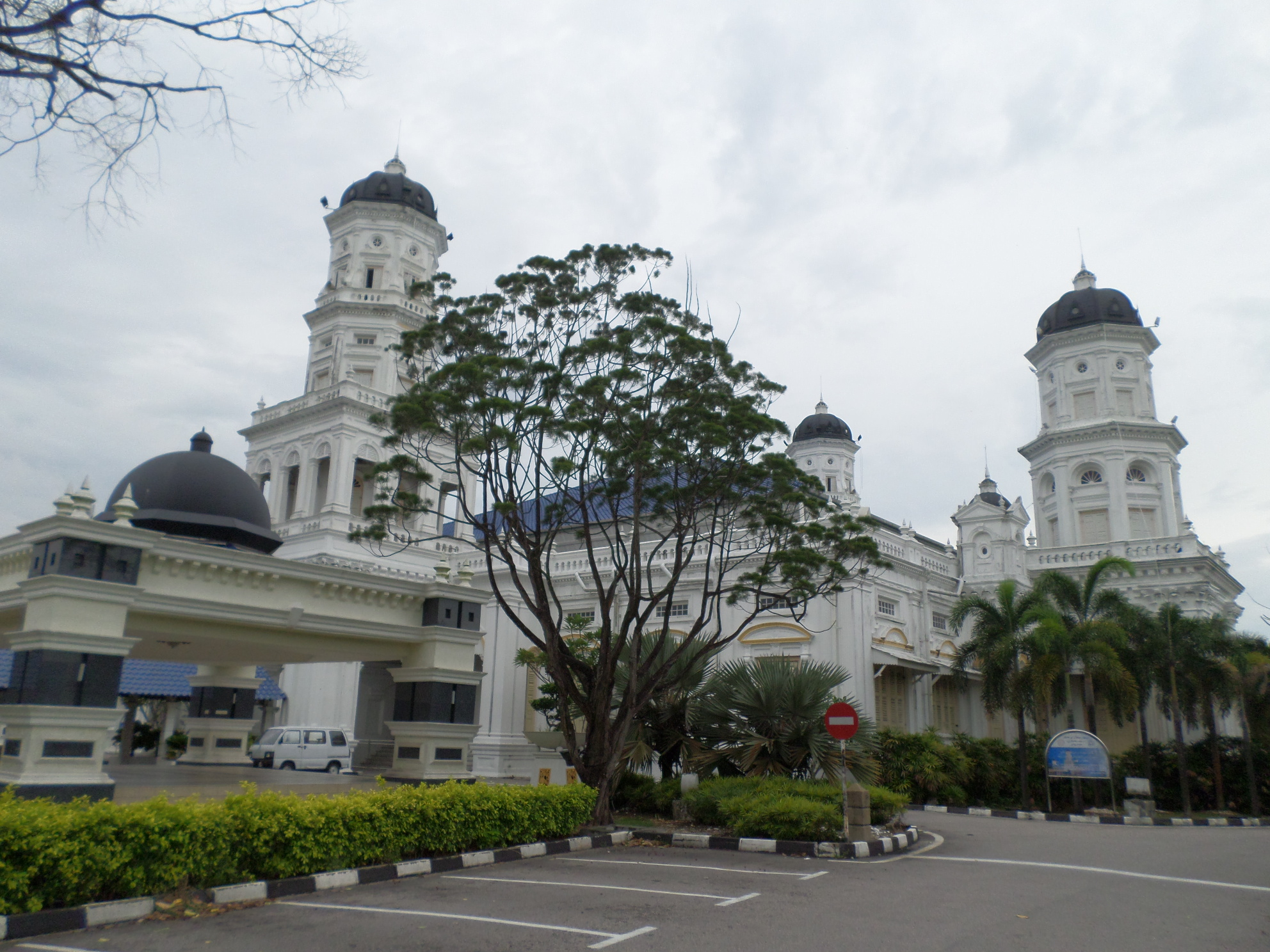

- Location within Johor

Religion
- Affiliation: Islam
- Branch/tradition: Sunni

Location
- Location: Johor Bahru, Johor, Malaysia
- Coordinates: 1°27′25.04″N 103°45′3.79″E

Architecture
- Type: mosque
- Style: Victorian architecture
- Minaret: 4

Sultan Abu Bakar State Mosque (Malay: Masjid Negeri Sultan Abu Bakar) is the state mosque of Johor, Malaysia. Located along Jalan Skudai, Johor Bahru, the mosque was constructed between 1892 and 1900, under the direction of Sultan Abu Bakar.

== Construction ==
As the mosque's architect, Tuan Haji Mohamed Arif bin Punak set out to recreate colonial English Victorian architecture as noted by the minarets that take the form of British 19th century clocktowers. The mosque also features some Moorish architecture elements, along with some minor Malay influence. Tuan Haji Mohamed Arif bin Punak was supervised by the Johor government engineer Dato' Yahya bin Awalluddin who communicated the Anglophile sentiments of Sultan Ibrahim ibni Sultan Abu Bakar, the Sultan of Johor at that time. This Anglophile influence can further be seen in the British architectural influences not only on the Sultan Abu Bakar State Mosque but also in several others government and palace buildings in Johor constructed during the same period.

The mosque sits on top of a prominent hill, overlooking the Straits of Johor and was named for Sultan Abu Bakar, the father of Sultan Ibrahim who ordered its construction. It can accommodate 2,000 worshippers at any one time.

== Transportation ==
The mosque is accessible by Muafakat Bus route P-101.

== See also ==
- Islam in Malaysia
