= Iskandar Malaysia =

Special economic zone in Johor, Malaysia

- Special economic zone
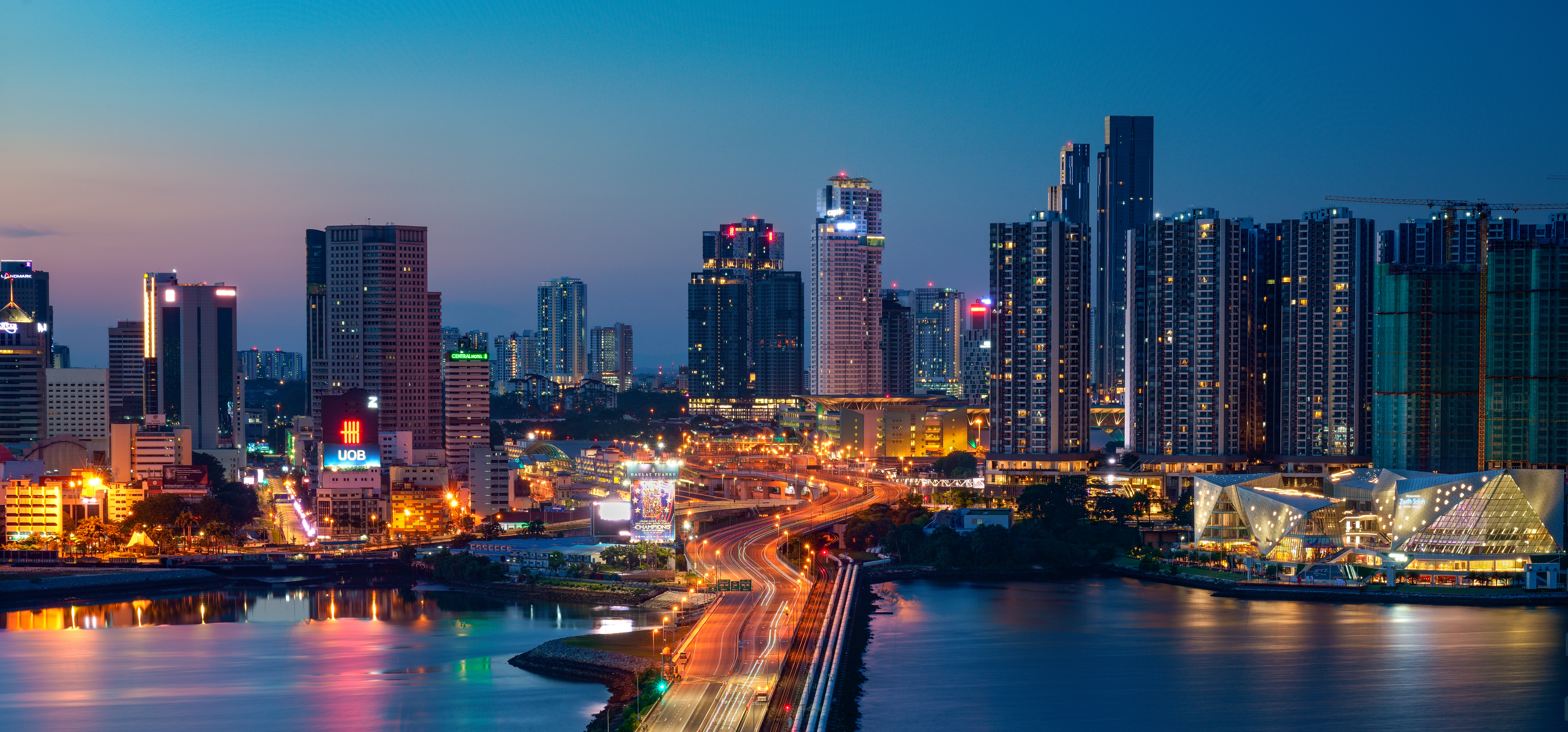
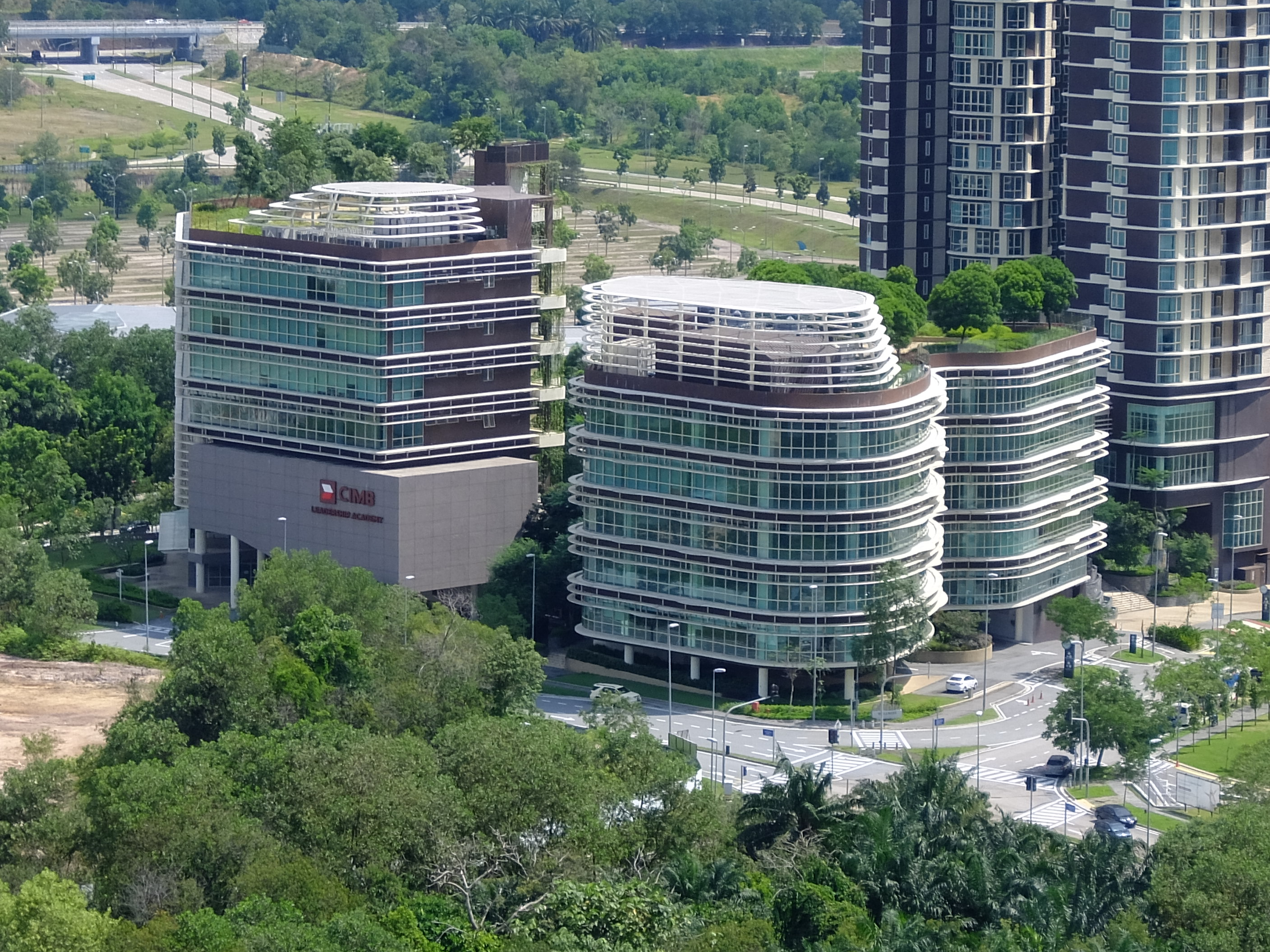
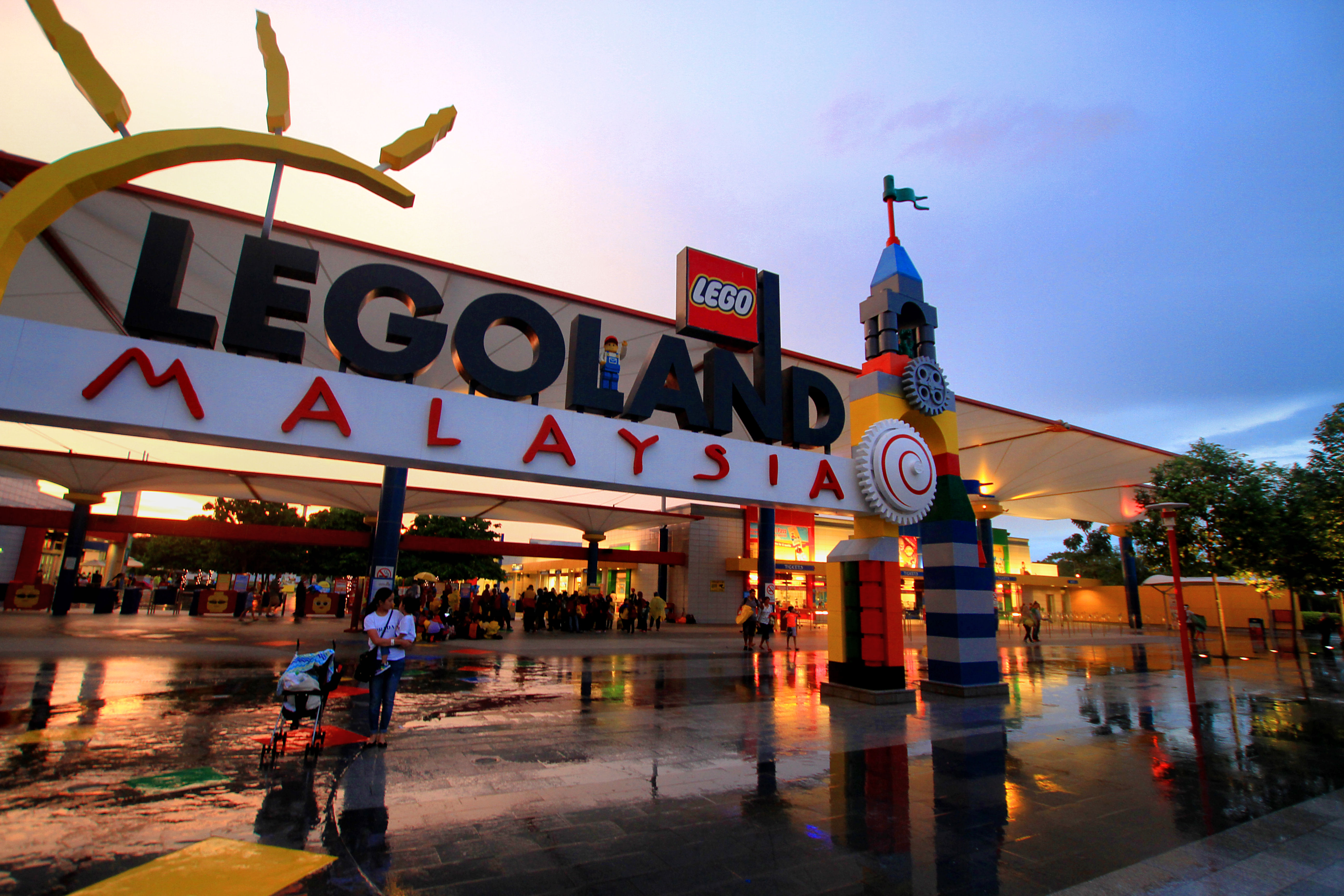
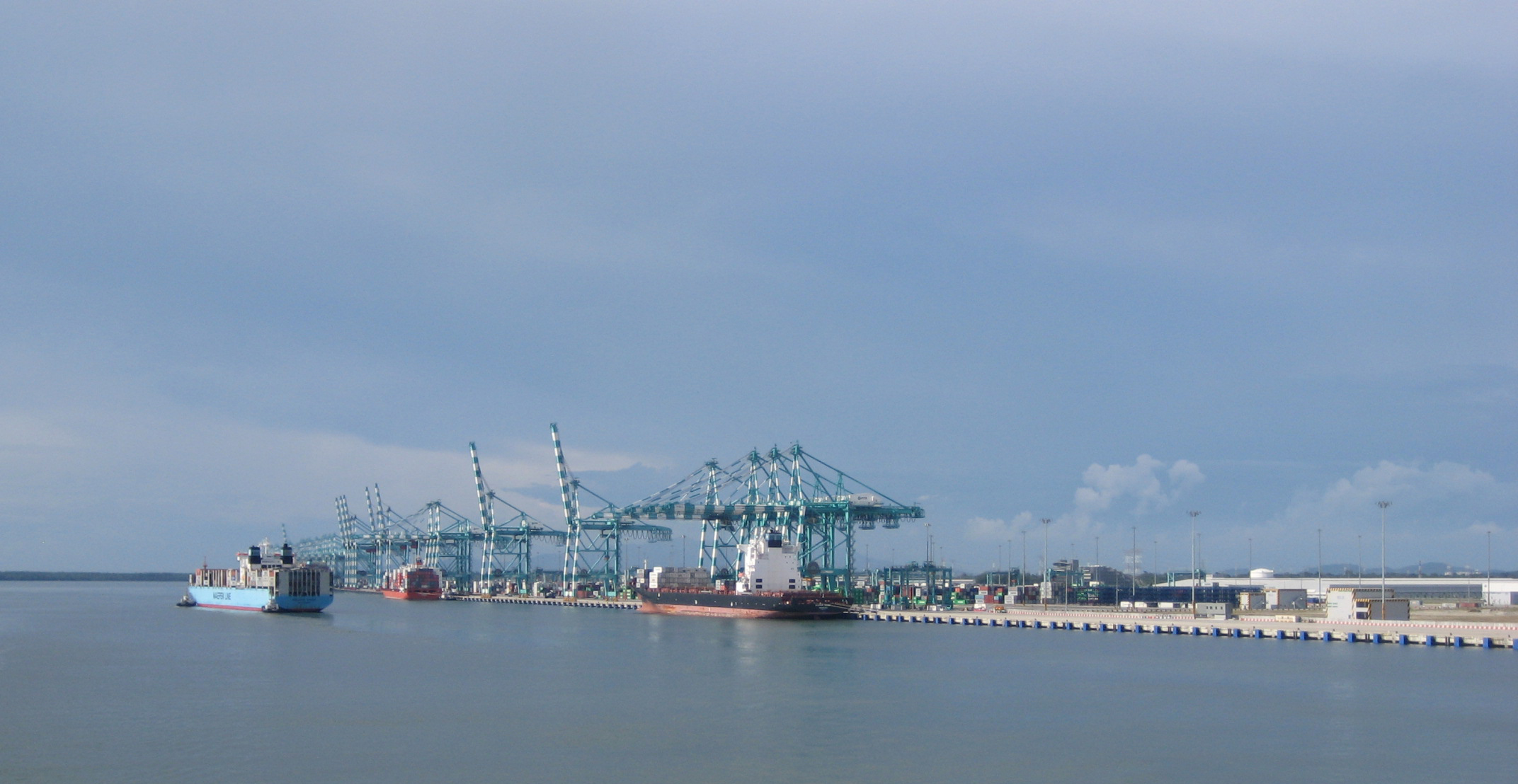
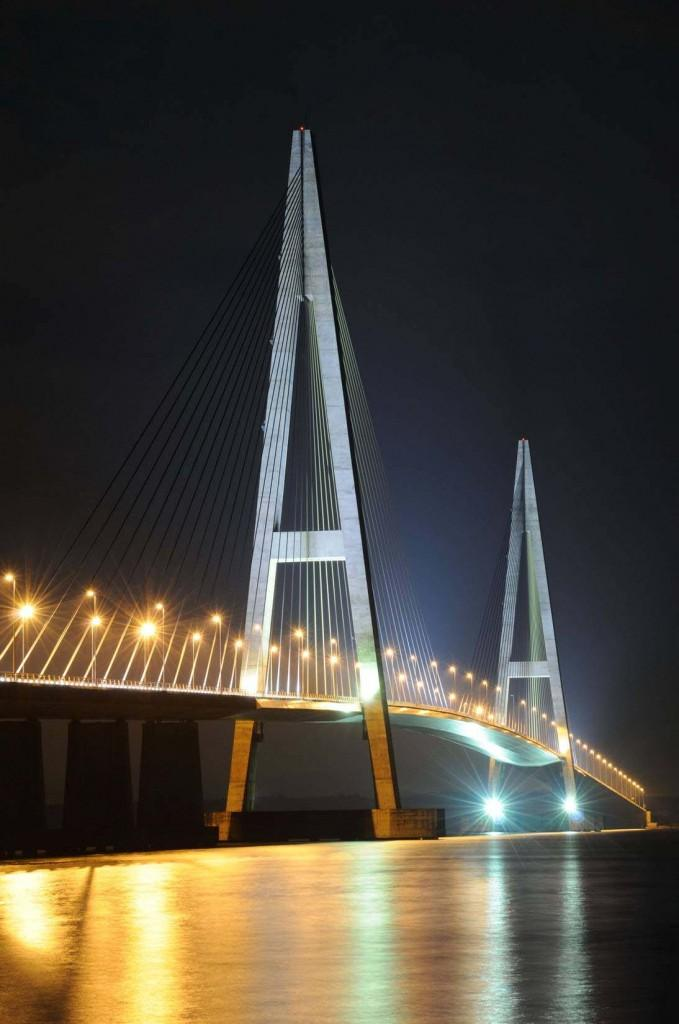
- From top, clockwise: Johor Bahru CBD skyline, Legoland Malaysia Resort, Sungai Johor Bridge, Port of Tanjung Pelepas, Iskandar Puteri
- Country: Malaysia
- State: Johor
- Districts: Johor Bahru; Kulai; Pontian

Government
  - Statutory body: Iskandar Regional Development Authority (IRDA)
  - Chairman: Anwar Ibrahim
  - Chief Executive Officer: Mohd Noorazam Osman

Population (2020)
  - Total: 2,085,546
- Time zone: UTC+8 (Malaysian Standard Time)
- Postcode: 79xxx-82xxx, 86xxx
- Area codes: +607 (07-2, 07-3, 07-5, 07-6, 07-7 and 07-8)
- Website: iskandarmalaysia.com.my

Iskandar Malaysia (formerly known as Iskandar Development Region and South Johor Economic Region), is the main southern development corridor in Johor, Malaysia. It was established on 8 November 2006. Iskandar Malaysia is currently the largest special economic zone in Malaysia by investment value, having a total amount of over RM413.1 billion.

== History ==
The investment corridor of Iskandar Malaysia (IM) grew out of a 2005 government requested feasibility study by the Khazanah Nasional which found that the development of such a zone would be economically, socially and developmentally beneficial. The National SJER Planning Committee (NSPC), hearing Khazanah's findings, put it in charge of developing a sustainable, holistic approach to development in the region. IM was singled out as among the high-impact developments of the Ninth Malaysia Plan, put into action by the then Prime Minister of Malaysia (Abdullah Ahmad Badawi) in March 2006 to cover the period of 2006 to 2010. In November 2006, the Prime Minister, Chief Minister of Johor, Abdul Ghani Othman and Khazanah revealed the Comprehensive Development Plan (CDP).

In 2007, the Malaysia-Singapore Joint Ministerial Committee for Iskandar Malaysia (JMCIM) was established to meet annually and review cooperation and developments in IM. During the 16th meeting of the JMCIM on 14 July 2023, it was announced that a task force, led by the Ministry of Trade & Industry from Singapore and Ministry of Economy from Malaysia, would be formed to study the feasibility of setting up a Special Economic Zone (SEZ). Representatives of the two countries signed a Memorandum Of Understanding (MOU) on the SEZ on 11 January 2024.

== Area ==
Local government areas within Iskandar Malaysia

The development region encompasses an area of 2,300 km^{2} covering Johor Bahru District, Kulai District and part of Pontian District. 5 local government authorities have jurisdiction over the covered area, including Johor Bahru City Council, Iskandar Puteri City Council, Pasir Gudang City Council, Kulai Municipal Council, Pontian Municipal Council.

The population of Iskandar Malaysia was slightly over 2 million in 2020.

== Population by local government area ==
The population table is based on the official census of 2020 for the local government areas within Iskandar Malaysia.

Local government area	Local government body	Population
Johor Bahru	Johor Bahru City Council	858,118
Iskandar Puteri	Iskandar Puteri City Council	575,977
Pasir Gudang	Pasir Gudang City Council	312,437
Kulai	Kulai Municipal Council	294,156
Pontian	Pontian Municipal Council (Note: Only Mukim Serkat, Sungai Karang, Jeram Patu and Bandar Pekan Nanas are within the Iskandar Malaysia boundary.)	44,858
Iskandar Malaysia		2,085,546

== Major projects 2006-2025 ==
- Iskandar Coastal Highway
- Johor Bahru East Coast Highway
- Johor Bahru Eastern Dispersal Link Expressway
- Johor Premium Outlets
- Kota Iskandar
- Larkin Sentral
- Legoland Malaysia Resort
- Senai–Desaru Expressway
- Iskandar Puteri HSR (shelved)
- Johor Bahru–Singapore Rapid Transit System
- Forest City
- Gerbang Nusajaya
- Nusajaya Tech Park
- Ibrahim Technopolis (IBTEC)

== Transportation ==
=== Air ===
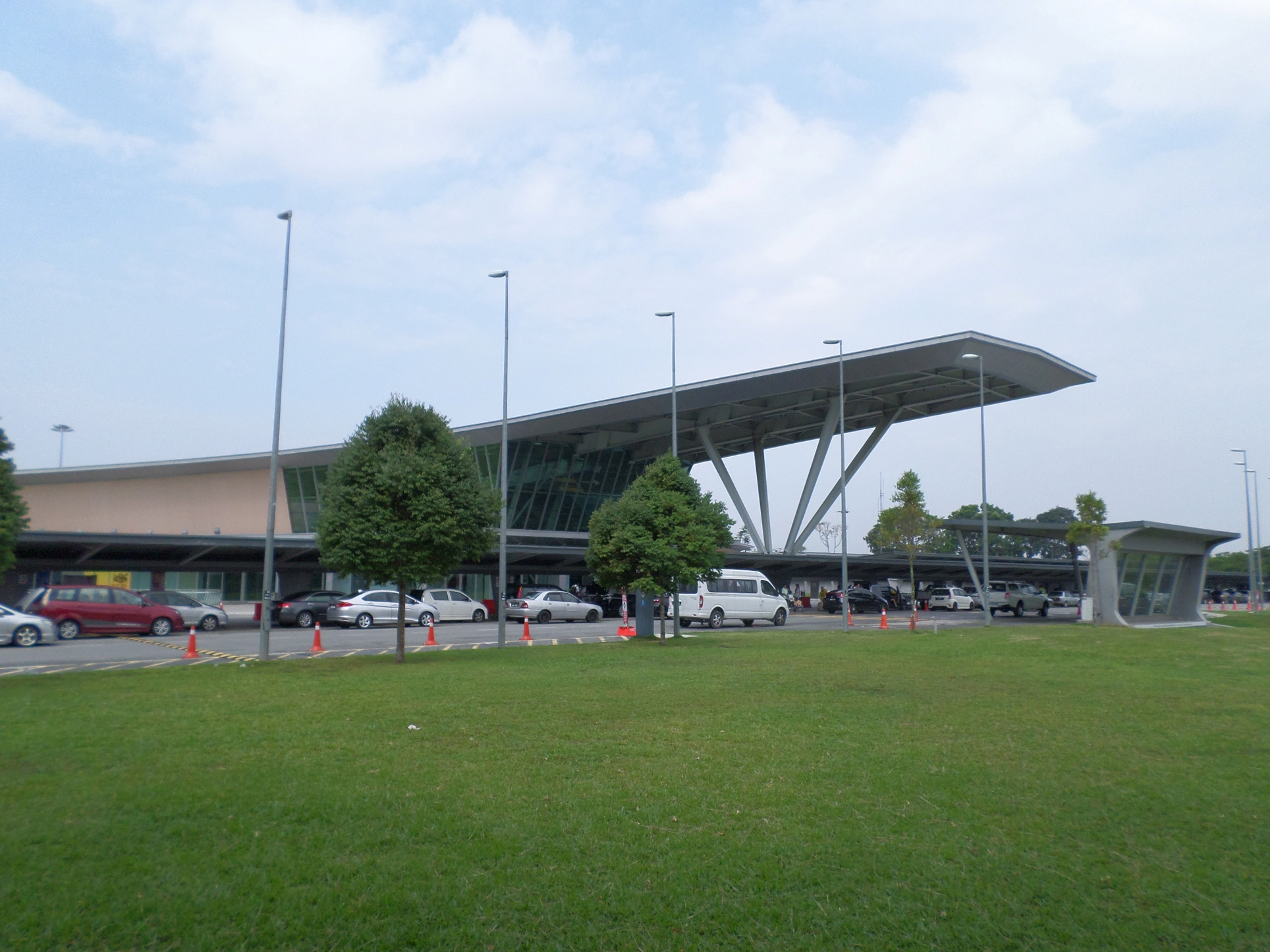
Senai International Airport in Senai, Kulai District.

The region is served by Senai International Airport which is located in Senai. Six airlines, AirAsia, Firefly, Malaysia Airlines, Malindo Air, Jin Air and Xpress Air, provide flights internationally and domestically.

=== Train ===
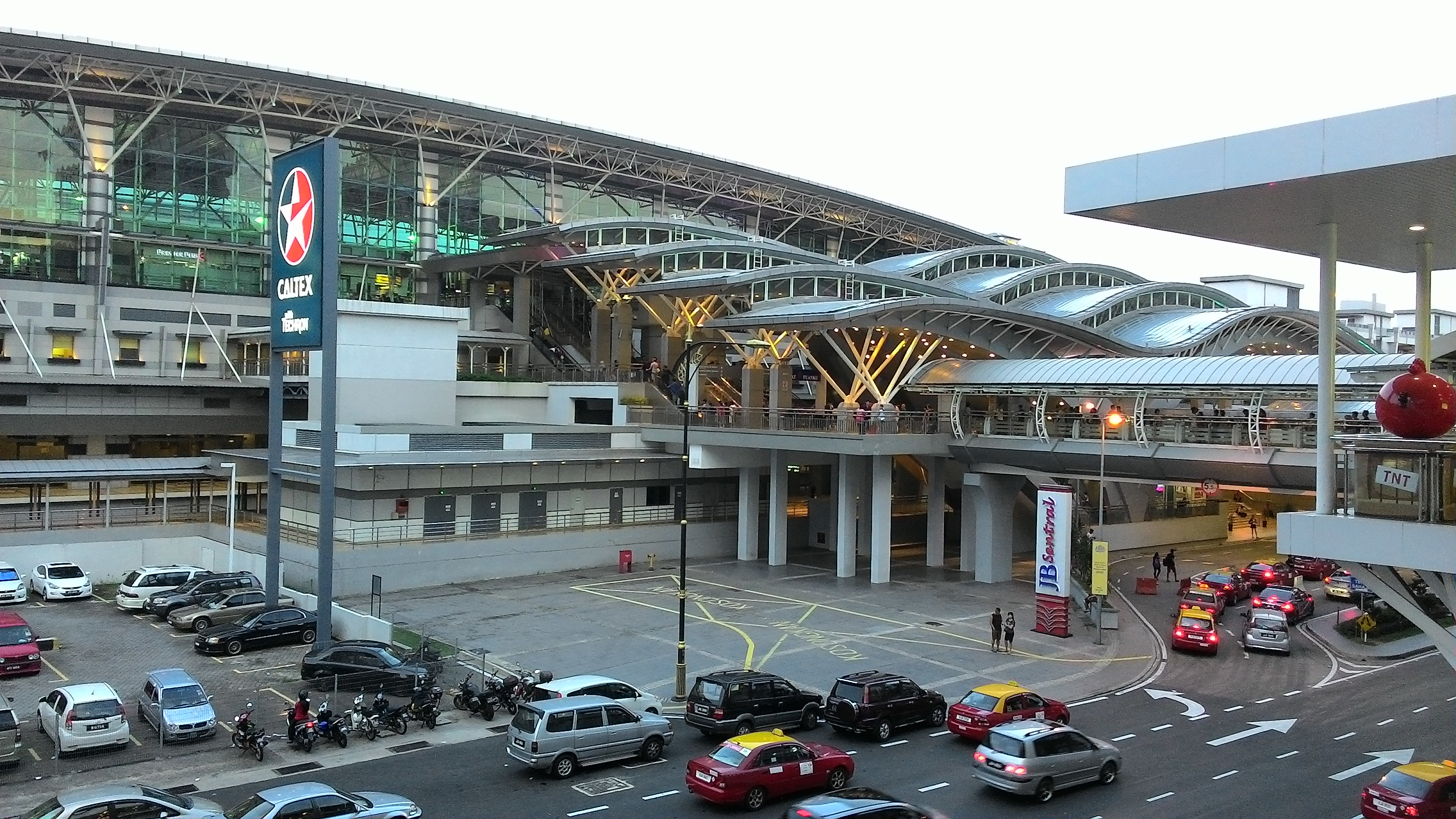
Johor Bahru Sentral Station in Johor Bahru.

The region consists of Johor Bahru Sentral, Kempas Baru and Kulai Station. The under-construction Johor Bahru–Singapore Rapid Transit System in Johor Bahru city centre, is the first LRT system in Malaysia outside Klang Valley.

=== Sea ===
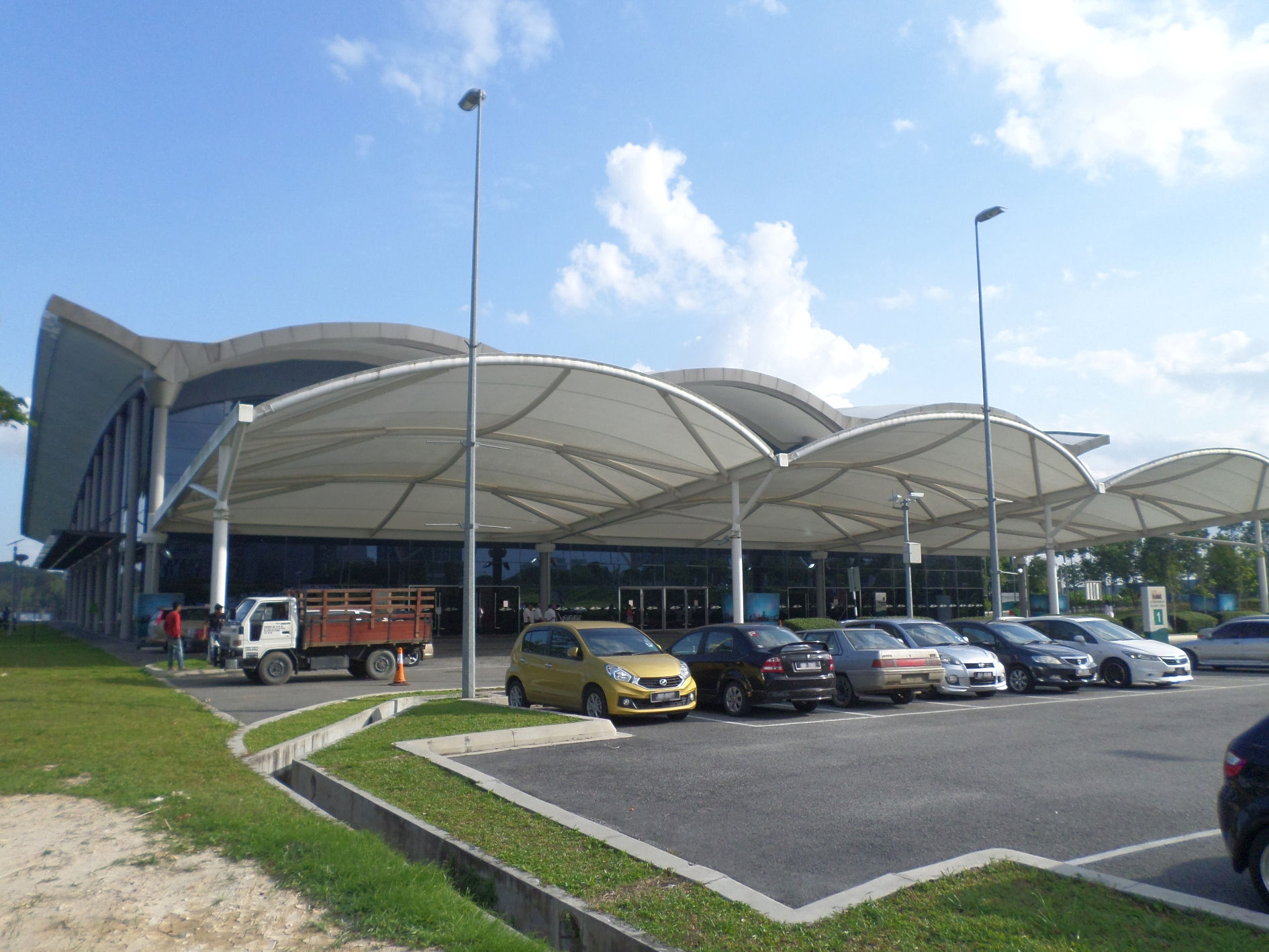
Puteri Harbour International Ferry Terminal in Kota Iskandar, Iskandar Puteri.

For cargo ports, the region consists of Johor Port in Pasir Gudang, Port of Tanjung Pelepas (PTP) in Iskandar Puteri and Port of Tanjung Langsat in Pasir Gudang. PTP is currently the 15th busiest port in the world.

For passenger service boats, the region consists of Johor Bahru International Ferry Terminal in Stulang, Johor Bahru, Kukup International Ferry Terminal in Kukup, Pontian District, Pasir Gudang Ferry Terminal in Pasir Gudang and Puteri Harbour International Ferry Terminal in Kota Iskandar, Iskandar Puteri.

=== Road ===
Larkin Sentral Bus Terminal in Larkin, Johor Bahru.

Iskandar Puteri houses Gelang Patah, GP Sentral, Kota Iskandar, Taman U, Taman Ungku Tun Aminah terminals. Johor Bahru houses JB Sentral, Larkin Sentral, Taman Johor Jaya and Ulu Tiram terminals. Kulai houses Kulai Terminal. Pasir Gudang houses Masai and Pasir Gudang terminal. Pontian houses Pontian Public Transportation Terminal. Grab operates in the city.

The internal roads linking different parts of the region are mostly federal roads constructed and maintained by Malaysian Public Works Department. The five major highways linking the Johor Bahru Central Business District to outlying suburbs are Tebrau Highway and Johor Bahru Eastern Dispersal Link Expressway in the northeast, Skudai Highway in the northwest, Iskandar Coastal Highway in the west, and Johor Bahru East Coast Highway in the east. Pasir Gudang Highway and the connecting Johor Bahru Parkway cross Tebrau Highway and Skudai Highway, which serve as the middle ring road of the metropolitan area. The Johor Bahru Inner Ring Road aids in controlling traffic around the city center of Johor Bahru. Access to the national expressway is provided through the North–South Expressway and the Senai–Desaru Expressway. The Johor–Singapore Causeway links the city to Woodlands, Singapore with a six-lane road and a railway line terminating at the Southern Integrated Gateway. The Malaysia–Singapore Second Link, located west of the metropolitan area, was constructed in 1997 to alleviate congestion on the Causeway. It is linked directly to the Second Link Expressway, Johor Bahru Parkway, the railway station, and the North–South Expressway. Further expansion of other major highways in the city were currently in process.

Iskandar Malaysia Bus Service (BIM) was a joint venture between the Johor State Government and the Iskandar Malaysia Public Transport Corporation (PAIM), under the supervision of the Iskandar Regional Development Authority (IRDA) that operated 16 routes in 2014.

Route	Destination	Via	Operator
IM01	Larkin - Giant Jalan Suria Utama		Maju
IM02	Giant Tampoi - Plaza Angsana - Giant Tampoi		Causeway Link
IM03	Taman Ungku Tun Aminah - Bandar Uda	Tampoi	Causeway Link
IM04	AEON Tebrau - Desa Cemerlang	Johor Jaya	Causeway Link
IM05	Gelang Patah - Pendas	CIQ, Tanjung Kupang	Causeway Link
IM06	Bukit Indah - Lima Kedai - Kota Iskandar		Maju
IM07	Gelang Patah - Kota Iskandar	Medini	Causeway Link
IM08	Taman Flora Heights - Today's Market		Causeway Link
IM09	Today's Market - Megah Ria - Today's Market		Causeway Link
IM10	Taman Sri Skudai - Taman Ungku Tun Aminah		S&S
IM11	Taman Senai Utama - Johor Jaya	Ulu Tebrau, Ulu Tiram, AEON Tebrau	S&S
IM12	Masai - Taman Desa Rakyat	Kota Masai	Maju
IM13	Kampung Pasir Putih - Masai	Pasir Gudang	Maju
IM14	Masai - Nusa Damai	Bukit Dahlia	Maju
IM15	Pasir Gudang - Kota Masai	Taman Pasir Putih	Maju
IM16	Taman Ungku Tun Aminah - Taman Tampoi Utama	Taman Impian Emas, Kempas	S&S

== See also ==
- Economy of Johor
- Economy of Malaysia
- East Coast Economic Region
- Malaysia Vision Valley
- Malaysian National Projects
- Ninth Malaysia Plan
- Northern Corridor Economic Region
- Cahaya Jauhar
- Sabah Development Corridor
- Sarawak Corridor of Renewable Energy
- The Greater Kedah 2050
