= Iskandar Regional Development Authority =

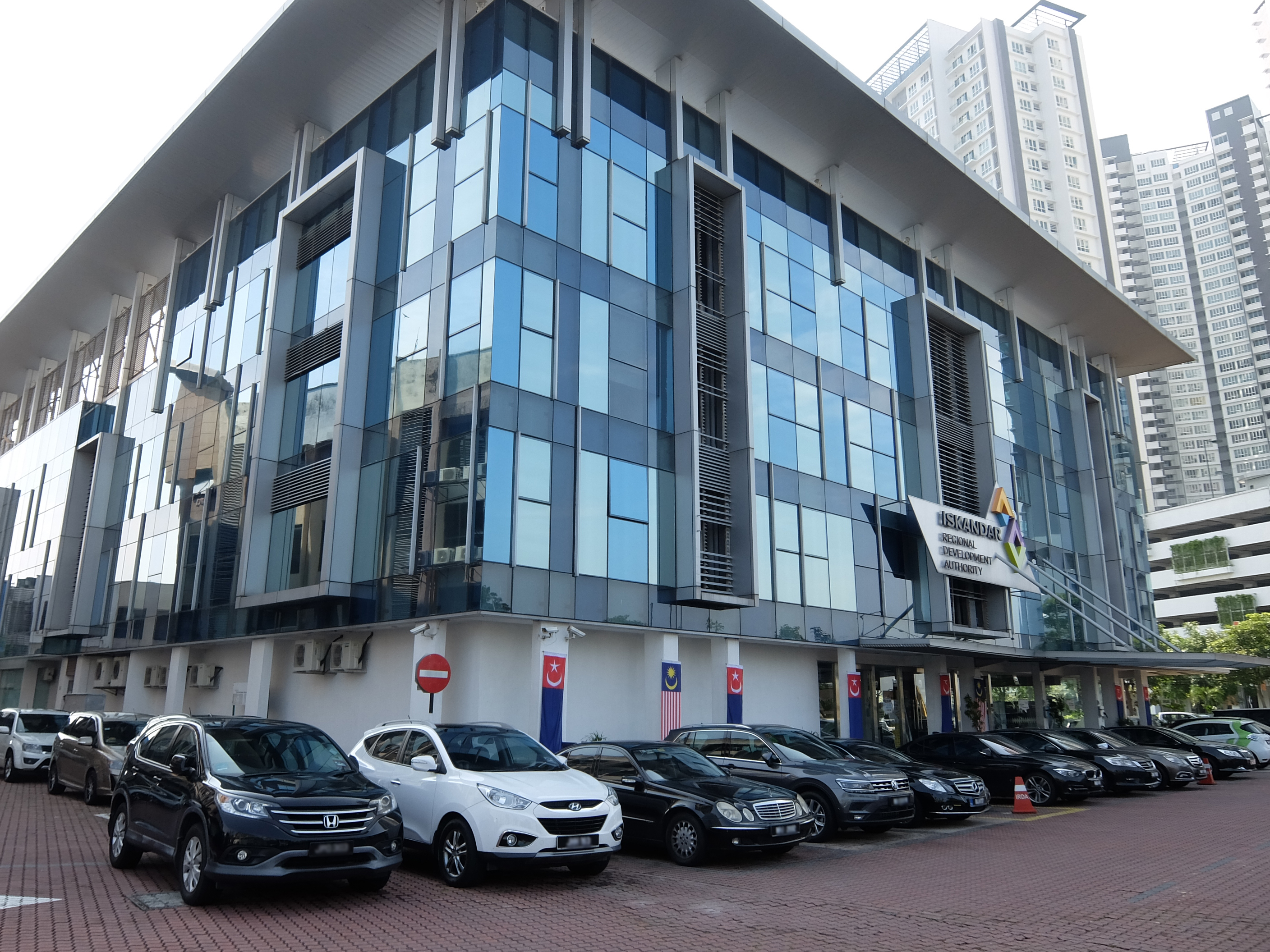
Iskandar Regional Development Authority

Iskandar Regional Development Authority (IRDA; Malay: Pihak Berkuasa Wilayah Pembangunan Iskandar; Jawi: ڤيهق برکواس ولايه ڤمباڠونن إسکندر) is the body responsible for the direction, policies and strategies in relation to development within the Iskandar Malaysia, having regard to the general framework of national and Johor State policies. Pursuant to this responsibility, IRDA will assist the State Planning Committee (SPC) and relevant local planning authorities to co-ordinate development, and for this purpose IRDA will adopt a Comprehensive Development Plan (CDP) for use by such local planning authorities.

A Bill to incorporate the IRDA was tabled in and approved by the Dewan Rakyat and Dewan Negara on 13 December 2006 and 21 December 2006 respectively. The Bill received royal assent on 12 February 2007. The IRDA Act 2007 (Act 664) was gazetted the next day (13 February 2007), and came into effect on 17 February 2007.

An Approvals and Implementation Committee (AIC) will also be established by IRDA, which will have the responsibility to identify, monitor, and co-ordinate the roles and activities of all relevant Government entities to expedite the implementation of major or strategic development and investments.

== See also ==
- Iskandar Malaysia
