= Horizon Hills =

Coordinates: 1°27′15.5″N 103°38′31.5″E

- Gated Community in Iskandar Puteri
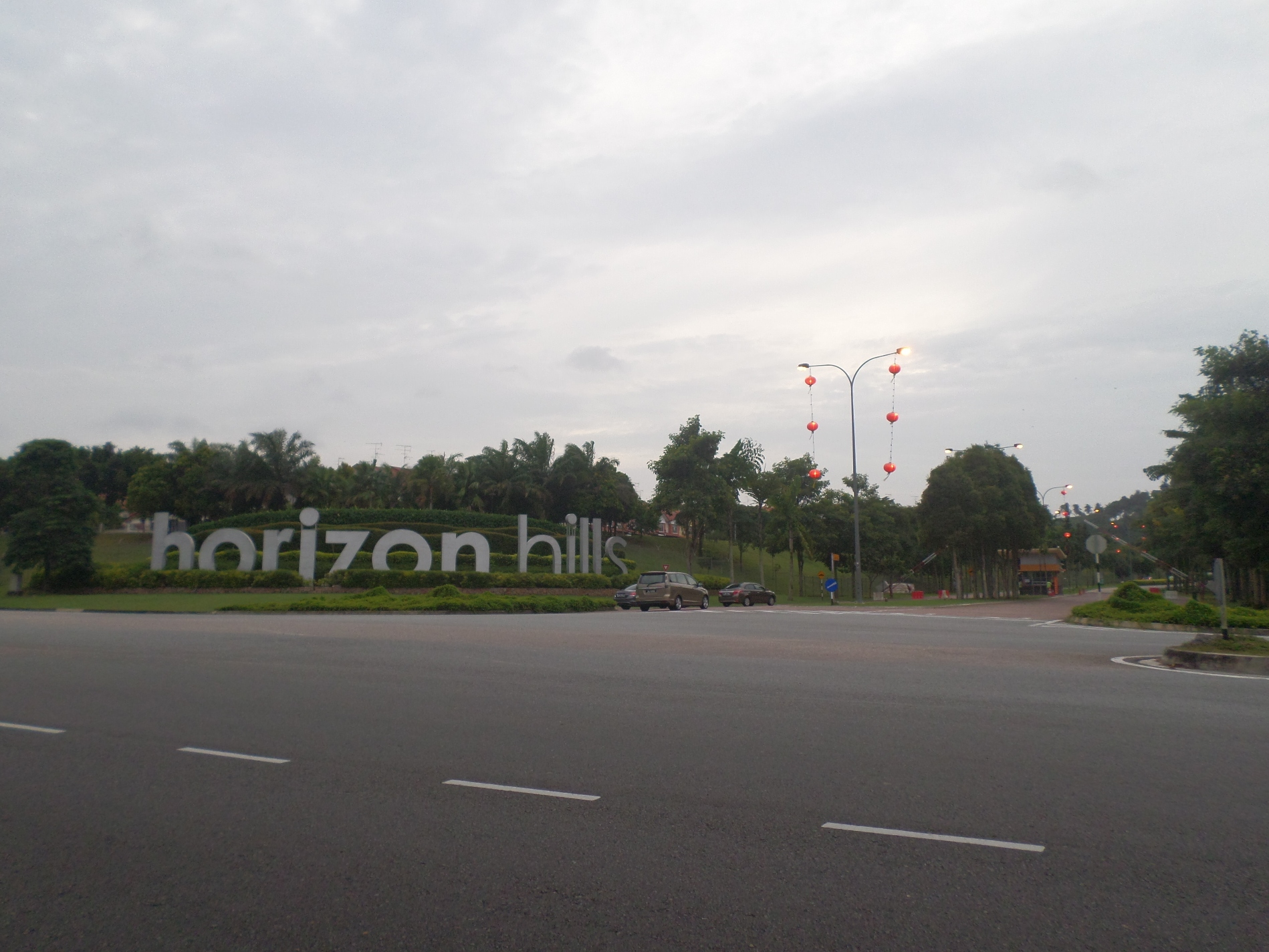
- Interactive map of Horizon Hills
- Location within Iskandar Malaysia
- Country: Malaysia
- State: Johor
- District: Johor Bahru
- Mukim: Pulai
- City: Iskandar Puteri

Horizon Hills (Malay: Bukit Horizon, Chinese: 浩然山庄) is a township situated in Iskandar Puteri, Johor Bahru District, Johor, Malaysia. It is Gamuda Land’s first township out of the Klang Valley. Jointly developed with UEM Land, the township spans over 1,200 acres (490 ha). The township opened in 2006.

As of 2008, over 60% of buyers in Horizon Hills were foreigners; half of them were Singaporeans.

== Type of development ==
Horizon Hills is a gated and guarded development ranging across 1,200 acres (490 ha) of freehold land. The township consists of 13 residential precincts.

Horizon Hills’ homes are built in small clusters to encourage community interaction. Parks, lakes and regional open spaces such as gardens, parks, wetlands and cycling path networks are integrated into the development. Horizon Hills Golf and Country Club has an 18-hole par-72 golf course spreading over 200 acres (0.81 km^{2}) with a 12 km golf front exposure as well as a resort clubhouse. and the first Horizon Hills neighbourhood which is “The Gateway” started its construction in mid 2006 to late 2008 and officially opened in 2009.

== Transportation ==
Horizon Hills is accessible via the North-South Expressway, Skudai Expressway and Perling Expressway.

It has four entrances (two of which will only be open in future), and the first two entrances can be accessed directly from a highway, making it fast, easy and convenient.
