= Skudai River =

River of Johor, Malaysia

The Skudai River (Malay: Sungai Skudai) is located in Johor, Malaysia. Its main tributary originated from a small creek within an oil palm plantation in Kg. Sedenak, Kulai, then flowing south-ward towards the Johor Bahru city. Its river mouth is located in Danga Bay, Tampoi discharging its water to the narrow Tebrau Straits. The length of its main tributary is about 43 km, whilst the overall tributaries length is approximately 308 km. The Skudai River Basin (SRB) comprises 270 km^{2} of land, divided into 22 sub-catchments. It is within the jurisdiction area of Kulai Municipal Council (MPKu), Iskandar Puteri CIty Council (MBIP), and Johor Bahru CIty Council (MBJB). Among its main tributaries and sub-catchments are the Danga River (15.3 km), Melana River (15.9 km), Senai River (10.4 km), Anak Sungai Melana (5.8 km), UTM River (5.3 km), Kempas River (4.8 km), and Sri Sengkang River (8.4 km). This network of streams flows through several towns (e.g. Kulai, Senai, Skudai, and Tampoi), huge residential establishments (e.g. Taman Tun Aminah, Taman Universiti, Taman Impian Emas, Taman Perling, and Bukit Indah) and several industrial parks, making them susceptible to pollution. The Danga River and Kempas River have been identified as the most polluted tributaries within SRB.

== Threat of urbanisation ==
This river has been largely modified due to urbanisation. Since year 2007 (in conjunction to the establishment of Iskandar Malaysia), its river mouth area had been extensively reclaimed and developed for exclusive property projects, most notably the high-density Country Garden and Tropicana mixed development complex. Worse than that, due to economic demand, in many sub-catchment, green land cover and oil-palm plantation were converted to property (built-ups). SRB was enlisted as one of the earliest pioneer for the Malaysia's Integrated River Basin Management (IRBM) project under Department of Irrigation and Drainage (DID) through 1 State 1 River project. The project aimed to enhance the water quality of the Skudai River. The outcome of the project was mixed, with majority of people and experts claimed it as a partial failure as the water quality of the river remained in between poor and satisfactory level.

== See also ==
- List of rivers of Malaysia
