= Bukit Indah =

- Suburb
- Interactive map of Bukit Indah
- Coordinates: 1.479995°N 103.659586°E
- Country: Malaysia
- State: Johor
- District: Johor Bahru District
- City: Iskandar Puteri
- Established: 1997

Population
  - Total: 60,000

Bukit Indah (Jawi: بوكيت اينده) is a suburb in Iskandar Puteri, Johor Bahru District, Johor, Malaysia. The township has a population of over 60,000 and over 10,000 houses. As Western Johor's most populated town, its connectivity and shopping district has made Bukit Indah the center of the Western Johor commercial district.

The town draws large crowds from Singapore as well as neighbouring Johor townships such as Horizon Hills, Medini, Taman Sutera, Tampoi Utama, Eco Botanic and Forest City.

== History ==
Bukit Indah was launched in 1997 by developer as one of the few master-planned towns in Johor. Bukit Indah was built using an Australian "Green-Street" Concept emphasizing landscaped linear gardens.

Bukit Indah's design won the Johor State Landscape Award 2001, the National Landscape Competition 2001 and the Best of the Best National Landscape Award 2005. Bukit Indah was the first town to introduce the town park concept in Johor Bahru.

== Transportation ==
Bukit Indah's public bus services connects to Singapore, Johor and other parts of Malaysia. In 2025, the new Nusajaya Coastal Highway and Interchange was inaugurated, greatly reducing the travel duration from the Causeway Checkpoint and the Second Link Checkpoint. From either checkpoints, Bukit Indah can be reached within 15 to 20 minutes via a private vehicle or taxi.

In line with both governments to ensure faster immigration clearance, MACS (Malaysia Automated Clearance System) has been implemented. This facility allows fast-track immigration clearance for foreigners from 63 countries and territories including Singapore. This has greatly reduced passport processing time to 5–15 seconds.

Alongside Larkin Bus Terminal and Skudai Terminal Tun Aminah (TUTA) are the two main bus terminal hubs in Johor Bahru, connecting Bukit Indah to other cities in Malaysia, including Malacca, Kuala Lumpur, Ipoh, Butterworth, and Georgetown, as well as Changi Airport, Singapore.

== Parks ==
Sireh Park is a 343-acre green recreational space in Iskandar Puteri, Johor, Malaysia. Recognized as the largest urban community green recreational park by the Malaysia Book of Records, it transforms a former coconut plantation into a thriving biodiversity and eco-park. Its name stands for Sustainable, Initiatives, Recreation, and Education Haven.

Bukit Indah Recreational Park is a 20-acre town park in the heart of Bukit Indah JB.
