= Danga Bay =

Coordinates: 1°28′30.0″N 103°43′26.4″E

Danga Bay Teluk Danga
- Suburb
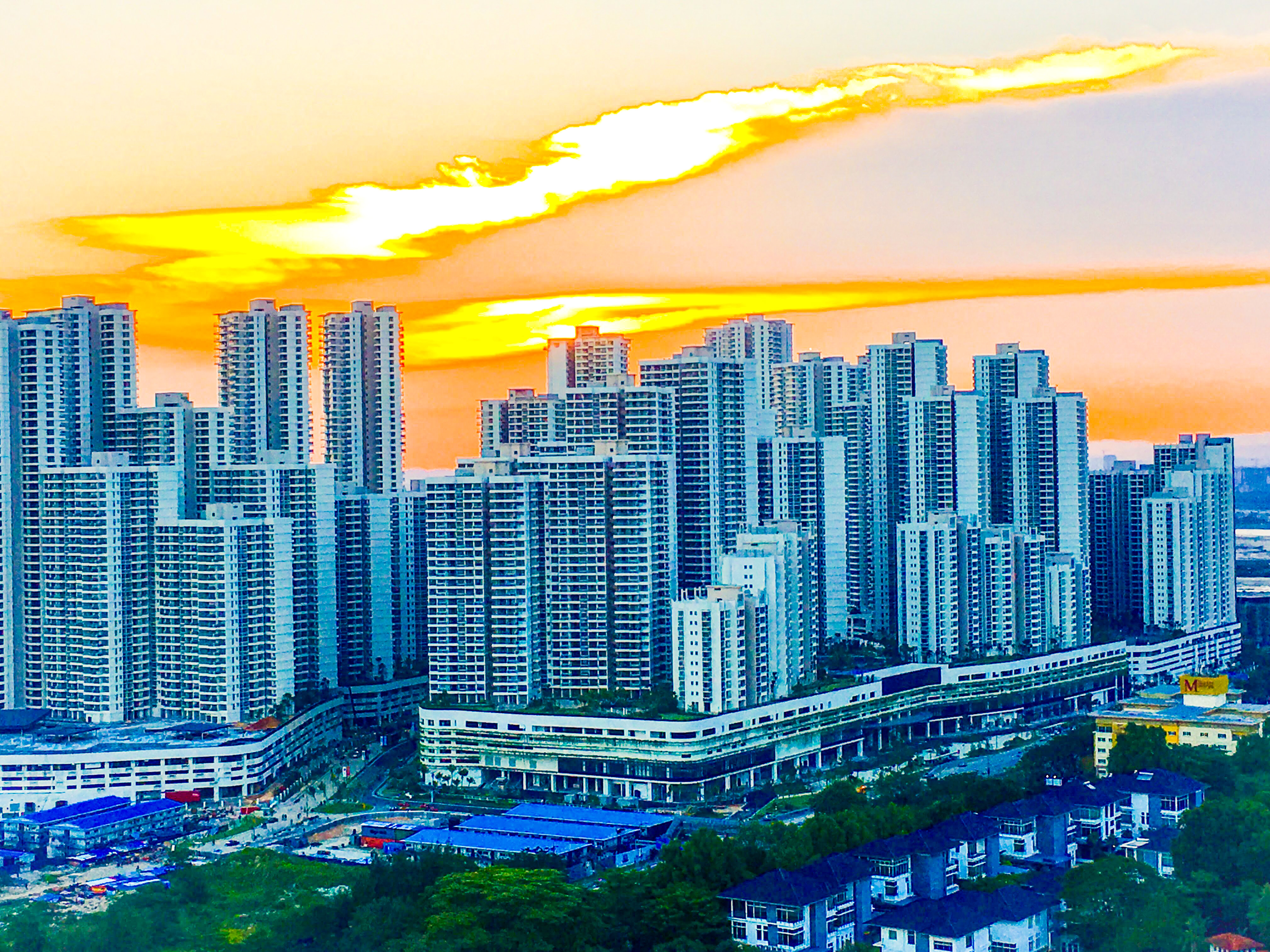
- Country Garden Danga Bay, one of Danga Bay's prominent residential neighbourhoods.
- Interactive map of Danga Bay
- Country: Malaysia
- State: Johor
- District: Johor Bahru
- City: Johor Bahru

Area
  - Total: 1.8 km^{2} (0.69 sq mi)

Danga Bay (Malay: Teluk Danga) is the largest recreational park in the city of Johor Bahru, Johor, Malaysia. It was developed by Tan Sri Datuk Lim Kang Hoo via Ekovest Berhad and is located near Istana Bukit Serene, about 7 km from Johor Bahru's city centre.

Large projects have been earmarked for this area, including a new financial and commercial hub, hotels, exhibition and convention centre, marina and upmarket residential properties.

== Location ==
Nestled in the south-central part of Iskandar Malaysia, Danga Bay is Johor Bahru's first and largest mixed residential-commercial development. It stretches along a 25km scenic waterfront facing the Straits of Johor and covers an area of approximately 450-acre (1.8 km^{2}).

== Residential neighbourhoods ==
- Tropicana Danga Bay
- Country Garden Danga Bay

== Transportation ==
Danga Bay can be accessed from Skudai Highway (Federal Route 1) via the Danga Bay interchange which becomes Jalan Skudai Route, which is located near Istana Bukit Serene. Those coming from Johor Bahru city centre can access Danga Bay via Jalan Skudai. It is also accessible by Causeway Link (J30, J31, J32, J33) from Johor Bahru Sentral Bus Terminal.

== See also ==
- List of tourist attractions in Johor
