= Mount Austin, Johor Bahru =

Residential area in Johor Bahru, Johor, Malaysia

Taman Mount Austin
- Suburb of Johor Bahru
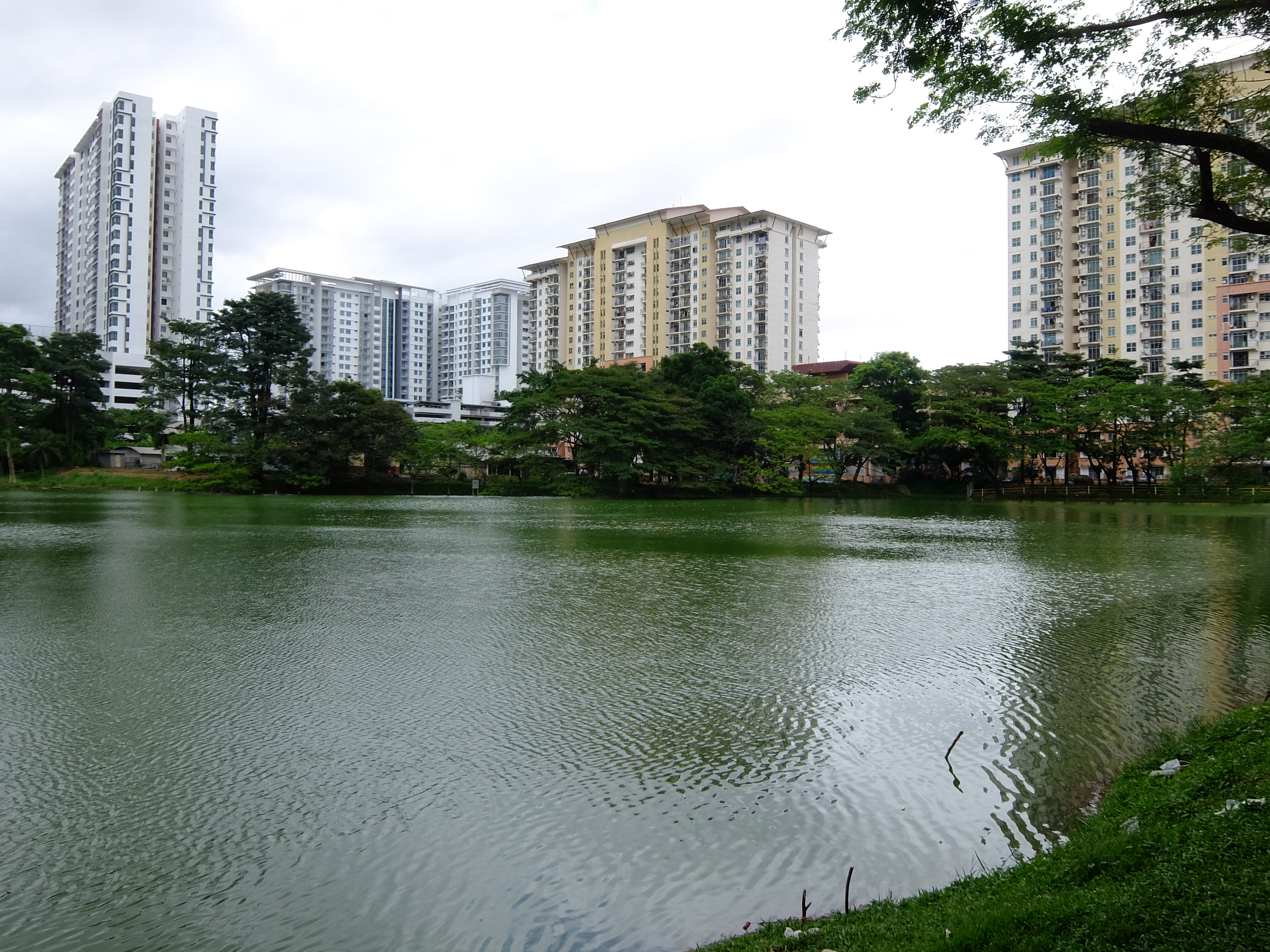
- Mount Austin Lake
- Interactive map of Taman Mount Austin
- Coordinates: 1°32′52.0″N 103°46′45.9″E
- Country: Malaysia
- State: Johor
- District: Johor Bahru
- City: Johor Bahru
- Built: 2015

Taman Mount Austin, is an area in Johor Bahru, Johor, Malaysia. The neighborhood has a mix of residential terrace and semi-detached homes, service apartments, industrial buildings to shop-office lots. It is an area of Johor Bahru known as bustling for having many cafes, restaurants, karaoke and bubble tea shops.

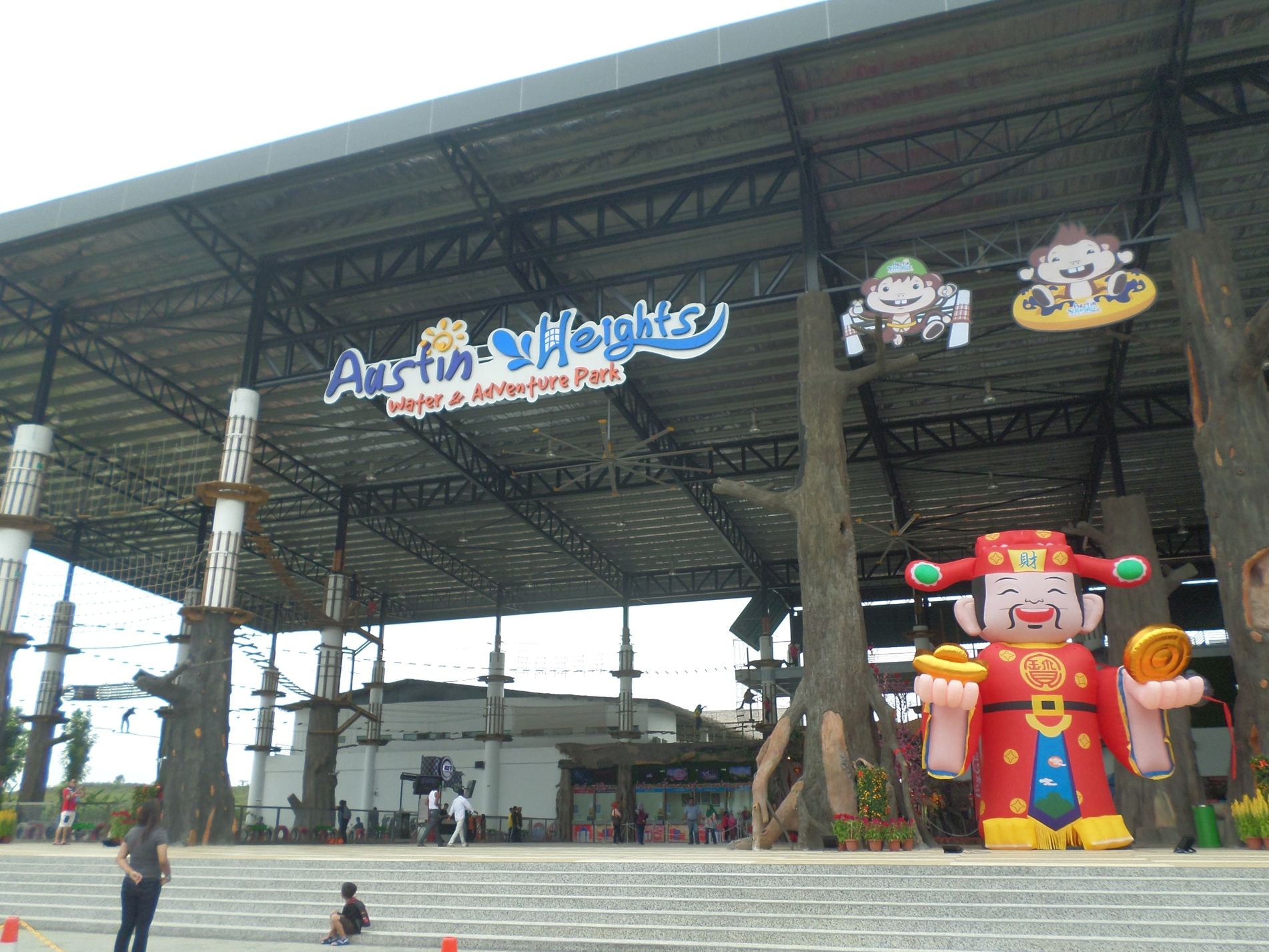
Austin Heights Water & Adventure Park

== Location ==
It is located 18km away from Johor Immigration Centre. Mount Austin is located in between Taman Setia Indah and Taman Daya. Mount Austin's neighbors are: Tebrau, Ulu Tiram, and indirect neighbors could be Skudai, Johor Bahru, and others.

== Transportation ==
Taman Mount Austin can be reached via the Pasir Gudang Highway or the Jalan Pandan federal route. These road networks are also connected to the North–South Expressway (Malaysia)(NSE). Note that there is a new roundabout added in the area, which may have heavy jams during peak hours.

== Tourism ==
Mount Austin is an area with an entertainment scene. Locals as well as visitors from nearby Singapore are attracted by the wide variety of cafes, restaurants, Karaoke TV & bubble shops.

- Typhoon Texas
- Mount Austin Sports Stadium

== Residential Estates ==
- Austin Heights (和麗園)
- Austin Residences
- Taman Mount Austin Perdana
- Taman Mount Austin Boulevard

== Education ==
- Austin Heights School
- Sunway College JB
- SJK (C) Foon Yew 5
- SJK (T) Ladang Mount Austin
- SMK Taman Mount Austin
