= Malaysia Federal Route 92 =

Road in Malaysia

Federal Route 92
- Pengerang Highway

Route information
- Length: 66.8 km (41.5 mi)
- Existed: 1972–present
- History: Completed in 1974

Major junctions
- North end: Kota Tinggi
- FT 3 / AH18 Federal Route 3 FT 3 / AH18 Kota Tinggi Bypass; FT 99 Jalan Sedili; FT 90 Jalan Desaru; Senai–Desaru Expressway; FT 89 Jalan Tanjung Belungkor; FT 90 Jalan Teluk Ramunia; J52 Jalan Tanjung Pengelih
- South end: Sungai Rengit

Location
- Country: Malaysia
- Primary destinations: Desaru, Bandar Penawar, Pengerang, Tanjung Pengelih

Highway system
- Highways in Malaysia; Expressways; Federal; State

Federal Route 92, also known as Pengerang Highway (Jalan Raya Pengerang), is a federal highway that runs from Kota Tinggi to Sungai Rengit in Johor, Malaysia. The 66.8 km (41.5 mi) highway is also a main route to Desaru beach. Federal Route 92 became the backbone of the road system linking the southeastern Johor before being surpassed by the Senai–Desaru Expressway E22.

== Route background ==
The Kilometre Zero of the Federal Route 92 is located at Sungai Rengit near Pengerang.

== History ==
Federal Route 92 was built under KEJORA (Southeast Johor Development Authority; or Lembaga Kemajuan Johor Tenggara in Malay) program to develop the poorly developed areas in southeastern Johor. It was constructed in the 1970s. By the 2000s, the highway was bogged down with severe congestion, and the Senai–Desaru Expressway was built to replace it.

== Features ==
- Road with 132kv of Tenaga Nasional Berhad, TNB's transmission line (Grid Nasional).
- Roads along oil palm mill and FELDA settlements.
- Traffic signs are both Malay and English.

At most sections, the Federal Route 92 was built under the JKR R5 road standard, allowing maximum speed limit of up to 90 km/h.

== Junction lists ==
The entire route is located in Kota Tinggi District, Johor.

Legend:

- I/C - Interchange, I/S - Intersection, RSA - Rest and service area, OBR - Overhead bridge restaurant, R/R - Restaurant and rest plaza, L/B - Layby, V/P - Vista point, TN - tunnel, T/P - Toll plaza, BR - Bridge

Subdistrict	Km	Exit	Name	Destinations	Notes
Kota Tinggi	66.8	9201	Kota Tinggi; Kampung Makam I/S	FT 3 / AH18 Malaysia Federal Route 3 (Original Route) – Kota Tinggi town centre, Bandar Tenggara, Kluang, Jemaluang, Mersing, Kuantan, Kota Tinggi waterfall, Kampung Makam, Sultan Mahmud Mangkat Di Julang Mausoleum	T-Junctions
Kota Tinggi	66.8		Mosque	Mosque	
Kota Tinggi	66.7		Kota Tinggi Museum	Kota Tinggi Museum –	T-junctions
Kota Tinggi	66.6	9202	Kota Tinggi Bypass I/S	FT 3 / AH18 Kota Tinggi Bypass – Kuantan, Mersing, Jemaluang, Kulai, Ulu Tiram, Pasir Gudang, Johor Bahru, Singapore	Junctions
Kota Tinggi	66.4		Estate		
Kota Tinggi	65.5		Estate		
Kota Tinggi		9203	Pasak (West) I/S	Jalan Pasak – FELDA Pasak, Kota Seluyut	T-Junctions
Kota Tinggi		I/S	Kampung Pasak	Kampung Pasak	T-Junctions
Kota Tinggi		BR	Sungai Seluyut bridge		
Kota Tinggi			Kampung Baru Seluyut	Kampung Baru Seluyut	
Kota Tinggi		9204	FELDA Ayer Tawar 3 I/S	Jalan FELDA Ayer Tawar 3 – FELDA Ayer Tawar 3	T-Junctions
Kota Tinggi		9205	FELDA Ayer Tawar 2 I/S	FT 1402 Jalan FELDA Ayer Tawar 2 – FELDA Ayer Tawar 2	T-Junctions
Kota Tinggi		9206	FELDA Ayer Tawar 1 I/S	FT 1401 Jalan FELDA Ayer Tawar 1 – FELDA Ayer Tawar 1 BH Petrol	T-Junctions
Kota Tinggi		9207	Panchor I/S	Jalan Panchor – Kampung Panchor, Kota Panchor	T-junctions
Kota Tinggi		9208	FELDA Ayer Tawar 4 I/S	FT 1401 Jalan FELDA Ayer Tawar 4 – FELDA Ayer Tawar 4	T-junctions
Kota Tinggi		9209	Jalan Teluk Sengat I/S	J222 Jalan Teluk Sengat – Teluk Sengat, Johor Lama, Kota Johor Lama	T-Junctions
Kota Tinggi		9210	FELDA Ayer Tawar 4 & 5 I/S	FT 1405 Jalan FELDA Ayer Tawar 5 – FELDA Ayer Tawar 5 Jalan FELDA Ayer Tawar 4 – FELDA Ayer Tawar 4 Petron	T-Junctions
Kota Tinggi		BR	Sungai Papan bridge		
Pengerang		9211	FELDA Sungai Mas I/S	J-- Jalan FELDA Sungai Mas – FELDA Sungai Mas	T-junctions
Pengerang		L/B	Bandar Mas L/B	Bandar Mas L/B –	
Pengerang		9212	Bandar Mas I/S	Jalan Bandar Utama – Bandar Mas	T-junctions
Pengerang		9213	Jalan Sedili I/S	FT 99 Jalan Sedili – Sedili, Waha, Lok Heng, Teluk Mahkota	T-Junctions
Pengerang		BR	Lebam River bridge		
Pengerang		BR	Sungai Chemperai bridge		
Pengerang		RSA	Penawar RSA	Penawar RSA –	
Pengerang		L/B	Desaru Fruit Farm	Desaru Fruit Farm	T-junctions
Pengerang	28.0	9214	Pengerang–SDE I/C	Senai–Desaru Expressway – Johor Bahru, Senai, Senai International Airport, Kulai, Singapore, Pasir Gudang, Kuala Lumpur; Jalan Tanjung Balau – Tanjung Balau, Kampung Nelayan, Fisherman's Museum	Intersections
Pengerang		L/B	Petronas L/B	Petronas L/B – Petronas	
Pengerang		9215	Jalan Desaru I/S	FT 90 Jalan Desaru – Desaru, Tanjung Balau	T-Junctions
Pengerang		BR	Sungai Chemangar bridge		
Pengerang		9216	Bandar Penawar I/S	Jalan Dato' Onn – Bandar Penawar, Town Centre; Lembaga Bandaran Johor Tenggara (LBJT) main headquarters, Masjid Al-Syifa, Bandar Penawar, Darul Takzim Science and Technology Institute (INSTEDT)	T-Junctions
Pengerang		BR	Sungai Lebam bridge		
Pengerang		9217	Jalan Tanjung Belungkor I/S	FT 89 Jalan Tanjung Belungkor – Sebana, Pasir Gogok, Tanjung Belungkor, Changi (Singapore) (Ferry)	T-Junctions
Pengerang		9218	FELDA Adela Tunggal Sening & Keleda I/S	FELDA Adela Tunggal Sening & Keleda	T-junctions
Pengerang		9219	Sebana Cove I/S	Sebana Cove – Sebana Cove Golf and Country Club, Sebana Waterfront, Sebana Cove Marina	T-Junctions
Pengerang	2.0	9219A	Jalan PULAREK I/S	FT 408 Jalan PULAREK – Pengerang, Tanjung Pengelih, Royal Malaysian Naval Academy (PULAREK), Pengerang Integrated Petroleum Complex (RAPID) Gate 2	T-junctions
Pengerang	0.0	9220	Sungai Rengit; Sungai Rengit I/S	J52 Jalan Tanjung Pengelih – Sungai Rengit, Pengerang Integrated Petroleum Complex (RAPID) Gate 1 FT 90 Jalan Teluk Ramunia – Teluk Ramunia, Pengerang New Settlement	T-Junctions
