= Malaysia Federal Route 213 =

Road in Malaysia

Federal Route 213
- Jalan Sedili Kechil

Route information
- Length: 12.45 km (7.74 mi)

Major junctions
- North end: Tanjung Sedili
- Jalan Sedili–Tenggaroh; FT 212 Jalan Tanjung Sedili; FT 90 Jalan Desaru; FT 90 Jalan Teluk Ramunia
- South end: Desaru

Location
- Country: Malaysia
- Primary destinations: Teluk Mahkota; Kampung Sedili Kechil; Tanjung Balau

Highway system
- Highways in Malaysia; Expressways; Federal; State

Jalan Sedili Kechil, Federal Route (formerly Johor state route J173), is a federal road in Johor, Malaysia. It is also a main route to Teluk Mahkota and Tanjung Balau. The Kilometre Zero of the Federal Route 213 starts at Tanjung Sedili.

== Features ==
At most sections, the Federal Route 213 was built under the JKR R5 road standard, with a speed limit of 90 km/h.

== List of junctions ==
Km	Exit	Junctions	To	Remarks
FT 213; 0		Tanjung Sedili	North; Jalan Sedili Tenggaroh; Haji Mohd Lazim Bridge; Tenggaroh; Tanjung Leman FT 212 Jalan Tanjung Sedili West; FT 99 Kampung Mawai Baharu; FT 99 Kampung Haji Mohd Jambi; FT 3 AH18 Mersing; FT 3 AH18 Kota Tinggi; FT 3 AH18 Johor Bahru East; FT 212 Tanjung Sedili; Pangkalan LKIM Tanjung Sedili; Malaysian Maritime Enforcement Agency (MMEA) Tanjung Sedili Maritime District	T-junctions
		Kampung Tanjung Lembu		
		Kampung Sungai Gading		
		Teluk Mahkota		
		Kampung Tuanseh		
FT 213; 12				
12.4		Kampung Sedili Kechil		
		Sungai Sedili Kechil bridge		
		Tanjung Balau	West; Jalan Tanjung Balau; FT 92 Kota Tinggi; Senai–Desaru Expressway Senai–Desaru Expressway; FT 3 AH18 Johor Bahru; FT 16 Senai; FT 16 Senai International Airport; FT 1 Kulai; FT 3 AH18 Second Link Expressway AH143 Singapore; FT 17 Pasir Gudang; North–South Expressway Southern Route AH2 Kuala Lumpur East; Tanjung Balau Fisherman's Museum	Junctions
		Desaru; Bulatan Desaru	FT 90 Jalan Desaru West; FT 90 Bandar Penawar; FT 92 Pengerang; FT 92 Kota Tinggi; Senai–Desaru Expressway Senai–Desaru Expressway; FT 3 AH18 Johor Bahru; FT 16 Senai; FT 16 Senai International Airport; FT 1 Kulai; FT 3 AH18 Second Link Expressway AH143 Singapore; FT 17 Pasir Gudang; North–South Expressway Southern Route AH2 Kuala Lumpur East; Desaru South; FT 90 Jalan Teluk Ramunia; Teluk Ramunia	Roundabout
