= Malaysia Federal Route 99 =

Road in Malaysia

Federal Route 99
- Jalan Sedili

Route information
- Maintained by Malaysian Public Works Department
- Length: 39.63 km (24.62 mi)

Major junctions
- North end: Kampung Haji Mohd Jambi
- FT 3 / AH18 Federal Route 3 FT 212 Federal Route 212; FT 1409 Federal Route 1409; FT 92 Federal Route 92
- South end: Bandar Mas

Location
- Country: Malaysia
- Primary destinations: Sedili, Teluk Mahkota, Waha, Lok Heng, Tanjung Balau, Bandar Penawar

Highway system
- Highways in Malaysia; Expressways; Federal; State

Federal Route 99, or Jalan Sedili, is a federal road in Johor, Malaysia. The 39.6 km (24.6 mi) roads connects Kampung Haji Mohd Jambi in Sedili to Bandar Mas. The Kilometre Zero of the Federal Route 99 starts at Bandar Mas, at its interchange with the Pengerang Highway (Federal Route 92).

== Features ==
At most sections, the Federal Route 99 was built under the JKR R5 road standard, allowing maximum speed limit of up to 90 km/h.

== Junction lists ==
The entire route is located in Kota Tinggi District, Johor.

Legend:

- I/C - Interchange, I/S - Intersection, RSA - Rest and service area, OBR - Overhead bridge restaurant, R/R - Restaurant and rest plaza, L/B - Layby, V/P - Vista point, TN - tunnel, T/P - Toll plaza, BR - Bridge
- C - Cloverleaf, S - Stack, T-A - Trumpet-A, T-B - Trumpet-B, DT - Directional-T/Y, SDT - Semi-Directional-T/Y, P-Y - Partial-Y, D - Diamond, P-C - Partial cloverleaf, D-D - Diverging diamond, D-R - Direct ramp

Location	km	mi	Name	Destinations	Notes
Sedili	39.6	24.6	Kampung Haji Mohd Jambi	FT 3 / AH18 Malaysia Federal Route 3 – Kuantan, Mersing, Jemaluang, Kluang, Kota Tinggi, Johor Bahru	T-junctions
Sedili	39.3	24.4	Kampung Mawai Baharu		
Sedili	38.8	24.1	Jalan Tanjung Sedili	FT 212 Malaysia Federal Route 212 – Sedili, Teluk Mahkota	T-junctions
Sedili			Jalan Perani	J179 Jalan Perani – Perani, Kota Tinggi, Johor Bahru	T-junctions
Waha			Waha	FT 1409 Malaysia Federal Route 1409 – FELDA Waha, FELDA Bukit Waha, FELDA Simpang Waha, FELDA Bukit Easter	T-junctions
Lok Heng			Lok Heng	Jalan Lok Heng – FELDA Lok Heng, FELDA Loke Heng Utara, FELDA Loke Heng Barat, FELDA Loke Heng Selatan	T-junctions
Bandar Mas			Sungai Papan Bridge		
Bandar Mas			Bandar Mas		
Bandar Mas	0.0	0.0	Pengerang Highway	FT 92 Malaysia Federal Route 92 – Kota Tinggi, Johor Bahru, Bandar Penawar, Desaru, Sungai Rengit, Pengerang, Tanjung Pengelih; Senai–Desaru Expressway – Johor Bahru, Senai, Senai International Airport, Kulai, Singapore, Pasir Gudang, Kuala Lumpur	T-junctions
1.000 mi = 1.609 km; 1.000 km = 0.621 mi
