= Malaysia Federal Route 90 =

Road in Malaysia

Federal Route 90
- Jalan Desaru; Jalan Teluk Ramunia

Route information
- Maintained by Malaysian Public Works Department
- Length: 9.2 km (5.7 mi)

Major junctions
- West end: FT 92 Pengerang Highway
- FT 92 Federal Route 92; FT 213 Federal Route 213; J52 State Route J52
- South end: Desaru

Location
- Country: Malaysia
- Primary destinations: Bandar Penawar, Tanjung Balau, Teluk Ramunia

Highway system
- Highways in Malaysia; Expressways; Federal; State

Federal Route 90, or Jalan Desaru and Jalan Teluk Ramunia, is a federal road in Johor, Malaysia. It connects Pengerang Highway, route 92 to Desaru. 4.9 km of this route is for Jalan Desaru

== Route background ==
The Kilometre Zero of the Federal Route 90 starts at Bulatan Desaru roundabout near Desaru.

== Features ==
- RAPID Pengerang Petrochemical Complex, the largest petrochemical plant in southern Peninsular Malaysia

At most sections, the Federal Route 90 was built under the JKR R5 road standard, allowing maximum speed limit of up to 90 km/h.

== Junction lists ==
The entire route is located in Kota Tinggi District, Johor.

Legend:

- I/C - Interchange, I/S - Intersection, RSA - Rest and service area, OBR - Overhead bridge restaurant, R/R - Restaurant and rest plaza, L/B - Layby, V/P - Vista point, TN - tunnel, T/P - Toll plaza, BR - Bridge
- C - Cloverleaf, S - Stack, T-A - Trumpet-A, T-B - Trumpet-B, DT - Directional-T/Y, SDT - Semi-Directional-T/Y, P-Y - Partial-Y, D - Diamond, P-C - Partial cloverleaf, D-D - Diverging diamond, D-R - Direct ramp

=== Jalan Desaru ===
Location	km	mi	Name	Destinations	Notes
Bandar Penawar			Pengerang Highway	FT 92 Malaysia Federal Route 92 – Kota Tinggi, Mersing, Sungai Rengit, Pengerang, Tanjung Pengelih; Senai–Desaru Expressway – Johor Bahru, Senai, Senai International Airport, Kulai, Singapore, Pasir Gudang, Kuala Lumpur	T-junctions
Bandar Penawar			Petronas Layby		
Bandar Penawar			SMT Bandar Penawar	Sekolah Menengah Teknik Bandar Penawar	
Bandar Penawar			Bandar Penawar	Jalan Dato' ABbdul Hamid – Bandar Penawar Town Centre, Lembaga Bandaran Johor Tenggara (LBJT) main headquarters, Al-Syifa Mosque, Bandar Penawar, Institut Sains Dan Teknologi Darul Takzim (INSTEDT)	T-junctions
Bandar Penawar			SMS Kota Tinggi	Sekolah Menengah Sains Kota Tinggi	
Bandar Penawar			SMKA Bandar Penawar	Sekolah Menengah Kebangsaan Agama Bandar Penawar	
Bandar Penawar			SMK Bandar Penawar	Sekolah Menengah Kebangsaan Bandar Penawar	
Desaru	0.0	0.0	Bulatan Desaru Roundabout	FT 213 Malaysia Federal Route 213 – Sedili, Tanjung Balau, Fisherman's Museum; FT 90 Jalan Teluk Ramunia – Teluk Ramunia	Roundabout
Desaru			Desaru guardpost		
Desaru			Desaru	Desaru – >Desaru Impian, Pulai Desaru Beach Resort and Spa	
1.000 mi = 1.609 km; 1.000 km = 0.621 mi

=== Jalan Teluk Ramunia ===
Location	km	mi	Name	Destinations	Notes
Bandar Penawar	0.0	0.0	Bulatan Desaru Roundabout	FT 213 Malaysia Federal Route 213 – Sedili, Tanjung Balau, Fisherman's Museum; FT 90 Jalan Desaru – Bandar Penawar, Pengerang, Kota Tinggi, Johor Bahru, Desaru	Roundabout
Bandar Penawar			Bandar Penawar	Jalan Dato' Onn – Bandar Penawar Town Centre, Lembaga Bandaran Johor Tenggara (LBJT) main headquarters, Al-Syifa Mosque, Bandar Penawar, Institut Sains Dan Teknologi Darul Takzim (INSTEDT)	T-junctions
Bandar Penawar			Kampung Baharu	Kampung Setajam, Kampung Punggal	
Bandar Penawar			Kampung Gambu		
Bandar Penawar			Kampung Baharu		
Bandar Penawar			Kampung Wakaf		
Bandar Penawar			Kampung Tanjung Che Lahom		
Bandar Penawar			Kampung Masjid		
Bandar Penawar			Batu Laut	Batu Laut Beach	
Bandar Penawar			Tanjung Sepang	Tanjung Sepang Beach	
Bandar Penawar			Teluk Ramunia		
Bandar Penawar			Kampung Changi		
Sungai Rengit			Rapid Pengerang Petrochemical Complex	Rapid Pengerang Petrochemical Complex	
Sungai Rengit			Sungai Rengit	FT 92 Malaysia Federal Route 92 – Kota Tinggi, Mersing, Bandar Penawar, Desaru; Senai–Desaru Expressway – Senai, Senai International Airport, Kulai, Singapore, Johor Bahru, Pasir Gudang, Kuala Lumpur; J52 Johor State Route J52 – Pengerang, Tanjung Pengelih	T-junctions
1.000 mi = 1.609 km; 1.000 km = 0.621 mi
