= Pengerang =

Municipality in Johor, Malaysia

- Municipality
- Coat of arms
- Interactive map of Pengerang
- Coordinates: 1°22′N 104°07′E
- Country: Malaysia
- State: Johor
- District: Kota Tinggi
- Special local authority area: 16 January 2017
- Municipality: 1 January 2020

Government
  - Type: Local government
  - Body: Pengerang Municipal Council
  - President: Norazmi Amir Hamzah (since 19 May 2025)

Area
  - Total: 1,288.3 km^{2} (497.4 sq mi)
- Website: www.mppengerang.gov.my

Pengerang is a municipality in Kota Tinggi District, in the Malaysian state of Johor. It was established in 2017. It is home to the Pengerang Integrated Petroleum Complex (PIPC), the largest petrochemical complex in Malaysia, and one of the major petrochemical hubs in the world.

== History ==
Pengerang as a place name was first mentioned in Hikayat Abdullah, a 19th-century traditional Malay literature.

Pengerang was initially a cluster of villages on the southeastern coast of Johor. In the 1860s the villages were overseen by a Datuk Penggawa Timur, a government officer appointed by the Johor Sultan to administer the state's eastern territory. In 1957, Pengerang was upgraded to a subdistrict (daerah kecil) under Kota Tinggi District.

== Government and politics ==
Pengerang Municipal Council Majlis Perbandaran Pengerang
- Emblem

Type
- Type: Local authority of Pengerang

History
- Founded: 1 January 2020
- Preceded by: Pengerang Local Authority

Leadership
- President: Norazmi Amir Hamzah (since 19 May 2025)
- Secretary: Zairul Adilla Zani

Structure
- Seats: 24
- Political groups: Councillors: BN (24): UMNO (14); MCA (8); MIC (2)
- Length of term: 1 April 2024–31 December 2025

Meeting place
- No. 7 Jalan Kempas 1, Taman Desaru Utama, 81930 Bandar Penawar, Johor Darul Takzim

Website
- www.mppengerang.gov.my

Pengerang was established as a special local authority area on 16 January 2017, after its separation from the Kota Tinggi District Council administration area. Its local government was initially named Pengerang Local Authority (Pihak Berkuasa Tempatan Pengerang, PBT Pengerang). It was the 16th (as well as the latest) local authority to be established in Johor at the time, then under the management of Johor Corporation, the state's economic development corporation. On 1 January 2020, the local authority was upgraded and renamed Pengerang Municipal Council (Majlis Perbandaran Pengerang, MPP), and subsequently the authority of Johor Corporation over the municipality was transferred to the state government.

The municipal area covers 128,830 hectares (318,300 acres) and encompasses five of the administrative mukims within Kota Tinggi District, namely Johor Lama, Pantai Timur, Pengerang, Sedili Kecil and Tanjung Surat. The main towns and villages encompassed by the municipality include:

- Bandar Penawar
- Pasir Gogok
- Sungai Rengit
- Tanjung Pengelih
- Teluk Ramunia
- Teluk Sengat

The municipal council's headquarters is currently located at a commercial shophouse in Taman Desaru Utama, Bandar Penawar. It would be replaced by an 8-storey tall new building located 1 kilometre from the present location under construction since 6 June 2024. The building was designed to resemble a traditional Malay sail boat called Jong.

=== Emblem history ===
The emblem of Pengerang Local Authority consisted of a shield with the map of Johor displaying the flag of Johor State and the highlighted location of Pengerang subdistrict between the Jawi Malay name of the local authority and three images of tree (stands for environment), ship (stands for development) and Integrated Chip circuit board (stands for technology). Since 2018, it was topped by the Johor Royal Crown and supported by two State arms tigers on both sides. Below the shield is a blue ribbon written with the romanised Malay name of the Local Authority.

A revised emblem was adopted on 6 March 2020 in conjunction with the launching ceremony of the Pengerang Municipal Council at the Bandar Penawar Lake Garden Square. Minor changes made on the shield including replacing the map of Johor with the map of Pengerang displaying the Kota Tinggi District Flag and the images of tree, ship and circuit board with coconut trees, sailboat, oil refinery platform and buildings. The blue ribbon below the shield was also stylised and decorated with golden black pepper wreaths.

Emblem of Pengerang Local Authority (16 January–31 December 2017)

Emblem of Pengerang Local Authority (1 January 2018–31 December 2019)

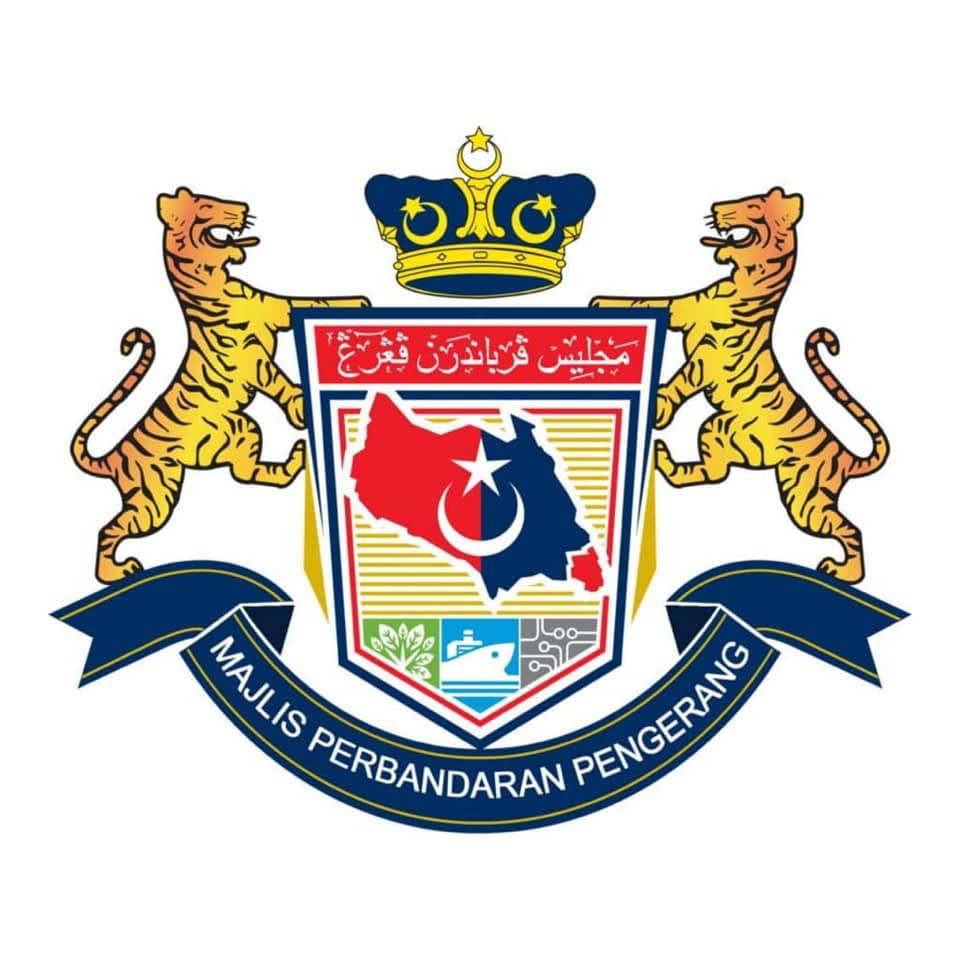
Emblem of Pengerang Municipal Council (1 January–5 March 2020), also known as the interim emblem

Emblem of Pengerang Municipal Council (6 March 2020–present)

=== Presidents of Pengerang ===
To date, seven people had serve as presidents of Pengerang Local Authority and Municipal Council, two of which (Hazlina Jalil and Zihan Ismail) are women.

| No | Name | Term start | Term end |
|---|---|---|---|
| 1 | Bukhari Abdul Rahman | 16 January 2017 | 16 March 2019 |
| 2 | Hazlina Jalil | 17 March 2019 | 31 January 2021 |
| 3 | Fizwan Mohd Rashidi | 1 February 2021 | 14 February 2023 |
| 4 | Zihan Ismail | 15 February 2023 | 30 September 2024 |
| 5 | Mohd Johari Tarmidi | 1 October 2024 | 26 January 2025 |
| 6 | Mohammad Nazrul Abd Rahim | 3 February 2025 | 18 May 2025 |
| 7 | Norazmi Amir Hamzah | 19 May 2025 | Present |

=== Departments ===
- Management Services (Khidmat Pengurusan)
- Finance (Kewangan)
- Valuation & Property Management (Penilaian & Pengurusan Harta)
- Engineering (Kejuruteraan)
- Public Health & Licensing (Kesihatan Awam & Pelesenan)
- Urban Planning & Landscape (Perancang Bandar & Landskap)
- Building Control (Kawalan Bangunan)
- Community Development (Pembangunan Masyarakat)
- Enforcement (Penguatkuasaan)

=== Units ===
- Internal Audit (Audit Dalam)
- Law (Undang-undang)
- Corporate Communications & Public Relations (Komunikasi Korporat & Perhubungan Awam)
- One Stop Centre (Pusat Sehenti)
- Integrity (Integriti)

=== Administration areas (zones) ===
As of 2025, Pengerang is divided into 24 zones represented by 24 councillors to act as mediators between residents and the municipal council. The councillors for the 1 April 2024 to 31 December 2025 session are as below:

| Zone | Councillor | Political affiliation |
|---|---|---|
| Bandar Penawar | Mohd Halipi Ma'asip | UMNO |
| Taman Penawar Utama | Lokeman Mohamad | UMNO |
| Taman Permata Penawar | Nurul Insyirah Abdul Hamid | UMNO |
| Taman Mutiara Desaru | Jarizan Ismail | UMNO |
| Taman Penawar Harmoni | Mohd Azmirshah Abd Rahman | UMNO |
| Taman Desaru Utama | Nor Shamsul Mohamed | UMNO |
| Taman Sri Penawar | M Ghazalli Edin | UMNO |
| Bandar Mas | Roain Kodin | UMNO |
| Punggai | Aminudin Doll | UMNO |
| Bayu Damai 1 | Murni Abdullah | UMNO |
| Bayu Damai 2 | Yo Chin Xue | MCA |
| Teluk Sengat | Mohd Fauzan Sahri | UMNO |
| Desaru 1 | Lee Mui Chin | MCA |
| Desaru 2 | Pasupathy Mariappan | MIC |
| Tanjung Balau | Nor Asri Paimon | UMNO |
| Teluk Ramunia 1 | Tan Ding Chao | MCA |
| Teluk Ramunia 2 | Ong Poh Long | MCA |
| Sungai Rengit 1 | Ong Kooi Jin | MCA |
| Sungai Rengit 2 | Haris Yunos | UMNO |
| Tanjung Pengelih | Chua Sheng Yu | MCA |
| Bukit Pelali | Koo Yap Soon | MCA |
| Pasir Gogok | Arman Sahar | UMNO |
| Kampung Lepau | Saravana Kumar Murugeh@Murugaiah | MIC |
| Sebana | Lim Yong Ichi | MCA |

== Economy ==
The Johor State Government has picked Pengerang for a catalyst project for rural transformation program. Johor’s Chief Minister Datuk Mohamed Khaled Nordin said the area has seen steady development over the last few years as investments poured in because of the Pengerang Integrated Petroleum Complex (PIPC). “When Pengerang was chosen as the location for an oil and gas hub it was not only to give a positive impact to the country but to also transform rural areas where the people will reap the rewards of development,” he said at a press conference after presenting 100 agriculture land grants at Taman Bayu Damai, Pengerang on 23 February 2015.

Pengerang is well known for Malaysia's mega project named PIPC which is sited in the area. The project was announced in 2011 and Pengerang was chosen for Malaysia's national project due to its strategic location in the region. The PIPC is one big step in creating value to the downstream oil and gas value chain in Johor and Malaysia. Sited in Pengerang, it is a national mega project located on a single plot measuring of 20,000 acres. Upon completion, the project will house oil refineries, naphtha crackers, petrochemical plants as well as a liquefied natural gas (LNG) import terminals and a regasification plant.

The component of this mammoth project was first initiated with the development of the Pengerang Deepwater Terminal or PDT, a joint-venture between Dialog Group, Royal Vopak of The Netherlands and the State of Johor. Serving as a centralised storage facilities for trading, refining and petrochemical industry, the Deepwater Terminal is envisioned to have a storage capacity of 5 million cubic meters. The USD 3 Billion facility includes an independent terminal for trading, a dedicated industrial terminal for consumption of investors within PIPC and a Liquefied Natural Gas Terminal. The construction of a deepwater jetty facility with natural water depth would enable the berthing of both ultra large crude carriers and very large crude carriers. PDT received its first shipment of oil in the first quarter of 2014 and continues to cater to the growing demand for its services.

The other component of PIPC is the Petronas’ PIPC which is PETRONAS’ largest downstream investment in a single location to date, the development includes the USD 16 billion Refinery and Petrochemical Integrated Development Project or RAPID. This also involves the USD 11 billion associated facilities consisting of Air Separation Unit, Raw Water Supply, Cogeneration Plant, Regasification Terminal, Deepwater Terminal and Utilities and Facilities. Upon its completion in 2019, PIC will have a refining capacity of 300,000 barrels per day with petrochemical plants yielding an estimated production capacity of 3.6 million tonnes per annum of petrochemical products. The development of PIPC which received full support from both state government and federal governments will also benefit the local community by creating more access to economic opportunities other than the provision of public infrastructure and a complete infrastructure in Pengerang, Johor, PIPC also will create a total of 8,600 jobs in the operational phase by year 2020.

== Tourist attractions ==
Pengerang coastal batteries (a fort), located nearby Tanjung Pengelih, are a heritage trail of World War II. The battery was constructed at the mouth of Sungai Santi, overlooking Straits of Johor and was abandoned after the war. The battery is said to be the biggest defence fort outside the United Kingdom. It sits on a 610 hectares plot of land and once had barracks and a hospital. Pengerang battery is a lost fortress located in Johor. Overlooking Straits of Johor, it is located close to a Malaysian military camp, standing on the top of a little hill covered by jungle.

== Transportation ==
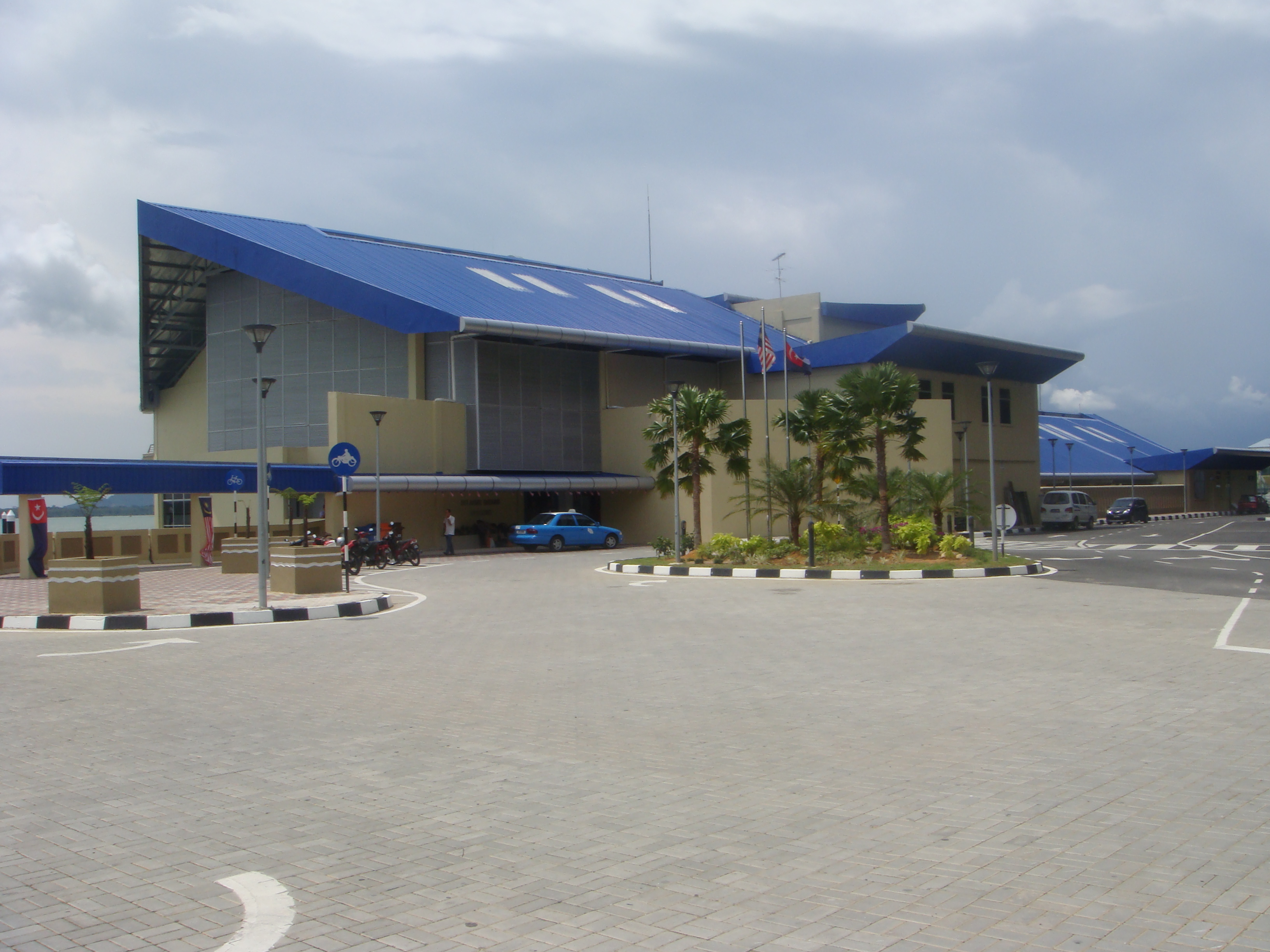
Tanjung Pengelih Jetty Terminal

The main road is provided by Route 92, from Kota Tinggi to the main settlement of Sungai Rengit.

Pengerang has two public ferry terminals at Tanjung Belungkor and Tanjung Pengelih. The port at Tanjung Belungkor hosts ferries to Changi Point, Singapore, as well as Sekupang on the island of Batam, Indonesia. The port at Tanjung Pengelih also hosts ferries to Changi Point, as well as Tanah Merah. There is also an exclusive port for customers to the Sebana Cove Resort travelling from HarbourFront and Tanah Merah.
