= Malaysia Federal Route 1409 =

Road in Malaysia

Federal Route 1409
- Jalan FELDA Waha

Route information
- Length: 4.7 km (2.9 mi)

Major junctions
- West end: FT 99 Jalan Sedili
- FT 99 Jalan Sedili
- East end: FELDA Waha; Bukit Easter

Location
- Country: Malaysia
- Primary destinations: FELDA WAHA * FELDA Bukit Waha * FELDA Simpang Waha * FELDA Bukit Easter

Highway system
- Highways in Malaysia; Expressways; Federal; State

Federal Route 1409, or Jalan FELDA Waha, is a Federal Land Development Authority (FELDA) federal road in Johor, Malaysia.

Kilometre Zero is located at the Jalan Sedili (Federal Route 99) junction.

At most sections, Federal Route 1409 was built under the JKR R5 road standard, allowing maximum speed limit of up to 90 km/h (56 mph).

== List of junctions ==
Km	Exit	Junctions	To	Remarks
FT 1409 (1409); 0		Jalan Sedili	FT 99 Jalan Sedili North; FT 212 Sedili; FT 99 Lok Heng; FT 3 AH18 Kota Tinggi; FT 3 AH18 Mersing South; FT 92 Bandar Penawar; FT 92 Pengerang; FT 3 AH18 Johor Bahru; FT 90 Desaru	T-junctions
		Petronas	Petronas	
FELDA Waha; FELDA Waha border arch
		FELDA Waha; FELDA Bukit Waha	FELDA Bukit Waha; Sekolah Kebangsaan Bukit Waha	T-junctions
		FELDA Waha; FELDA Simpang Waha	FELDA Simpang Waha; Sekolah Kebangsaan Bukit Easter; Masjid Jamek FELDA Gugusan Waha; Sekolah Menengah Kebangsaan Bukit Easter	T-junctions
		FELDA Waha; FELDA Bukit Easter	FELDA Bukit Easter	T-junctions
