= Malaysia Federal Route 212 =

Road in Malaysia

Federal Route 212
- Jalan Tanjung Sedili

Route information
- Length: 18.30 km (11.37 mi)

Major junctions
- West end: Kampung Mawai Baharu
- FT 99 Federal Route 99; Jalan Sedili-Tenggaroh; FT 213 Jalan Sedili Kechil
- East end: Tanjung Sedili

Location
- Country: Malaysia
- Primary destinations: Sedili; Teluk Mahkota; Tanjung Balau; Bandar Penawar

Highway system
- Highways in Malaysia; Expressways; Federal; State

Jalan Tanjung Sedili, Federal Route (formerly Johor state route J172), is a federal road in Johor, Malaysia. It is also a main route to Teluk Mahkota. The Kilometre Zero of the Federal Route 212 starts at Tanjung Sedili.

== Features ==
At most sections, the Federal Route 212 was built under the JKR R5 road standard, with a speed limit of 90 km/h.

== List of junctions ==
Km	Exit	Junctions	To	Remarks
18.3		Kampung Mawai Baharu	West; FT 99 Kampung Haji Mohd Jambi; FT 3 AH18 Mersing; FT 3 AH18 Kota Tinggi; FT 3 AH18 Johor Bahru Southeast; FT 99 Bandar Penawar; FT 99 Bandar Mas; FT 99 Lok Heng	T-junctions
FT 212; 18				
		Orang Asli Village		
		Kampung Batu Tiga		
		Kangkar Lama		
		Kampung Sayang		
		Sungai Gembut bridge		
		Kampung Gembut		
		FELCRA Kampung Sungai Gembut		
		FELCRA Kampung Padang		
		Kampung Singapura		
		Kampung Segundal		
		Jalan Sedili Kechil	North; Jalan Sedili Tenggaroh; Haji Mohd Lazim Bridge; Tenggaroh; Tanjung Leman South; FT 213 Jalan Sedili Kechil; Sedili Kechil; Teluk Mahkota; Tanjung Balau; Bandar Penawar	T-junctions
FT 212; 0		Tanjung Sedili	Pangkalan LKIM Tanjung Sedili; Malaysian Maritime Enforcement Agency (MMEA) Tanjung Sedili Maritime District	
