= Johor State Route J222 =

Road in Malaysia

Johor Route 222

Major junctions
- Northeast end: FT 92 Pengerang Highway
- FT 92 Pengerang Highway
- Southwest end: Teluk Sengat

Location
- Country: Malaysia
- Primary destinations: Johor Lama

Highway system
- Highways in Malaysia; Expressways; Federal; State

State Route J222, Jalan Teluk Sengat is a major road in Johor, Malaysia. It is a main route to Kota Johor Lama.

== Junction lists ==
The entire route is located in Kota Tinggi District, Johor.

Legend:

- I/C - Interchange, I/S - Intersection, RSA - Rest and service area, OBR - Overhead bridge restaurant, R/R - Restaurant and rest plaza, L/B - Layby, V/P - Vista point, TN - tunnel, T/P - Toll plaza, BR - Bridge
- C - Cloverleaf, S - Stack, T-A - Trumpet-A, T-B - Trumpet-B, DT - Directional-T/Y, SDT - Semi-Directional-T/Y, P-Y - Partial-Y, D - Diamond, P-C - Partial cloverleaf, D-D - Diverging diamond, D-R - Direct ramp

| Location | km | mi | Name | Destinations | Notes |
|---|---|---|---|---|---|
| Teluk Sengat | | | Pengerang Highway | FT 92 Pengerang Highway – Kota Tinggi, Johor Bahru, Bandar Penawar, Desaru, Sungai Rengit, Pengerang, Tanjung Pengelih; Senai–Desaru Expressway – Johor Bahru, Senai, Senai International Airport, Kulai, Singapore, Pasir Gudang, Kuala Lumpur | T-junctions |
| Teluk Sengat | | | Teluk Sengat Estate | | |
| Teluk Sengat | | | Teluk Sengat Palm Oil Mill | | |
| Teluk Sengat | | | Teluk Sengat | Jalan Perhubungan – Johor Lama, Kota Johor Lama; Jalan Tanjung Buai – Tanjung Buai | Junctions |
| Teluk Sengat | | | Teluk Sengat | | |
1.000 mi = 1.609 km; 1.000 km = 0.621 mi
