= Sungai Johor Bridge =

Sungai Johor Bridge Jambatan Sungai Johor 柔佛河大桥 جمبتن سوڠاي جوهر
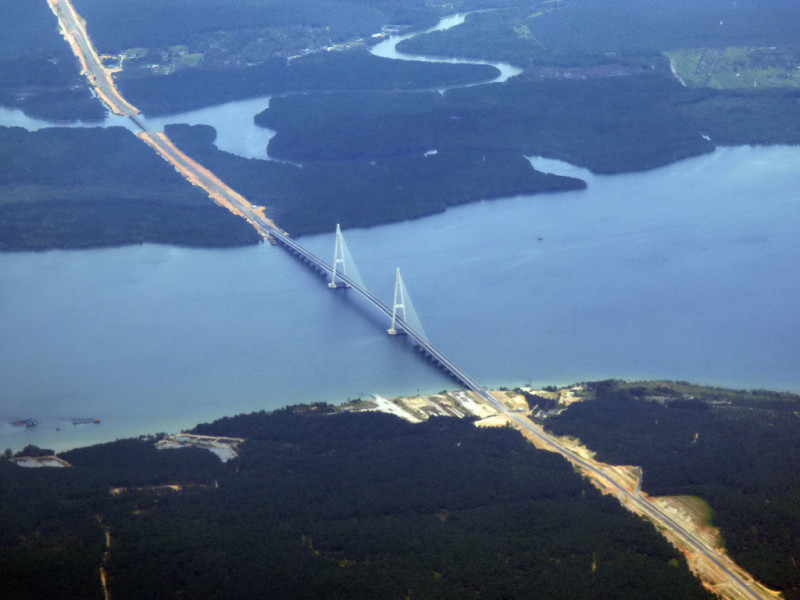
- Coordinates: 1°31′56″N 104°01′19″E
- Carries: Motor vehicles
- Crosses: Johor River
- Locale: Senai–Desaru Expressway
- Official name: Sungai Johor Bridge
- Maintained by: Senai-Desaru Expressway Berhad

Characteristics
- Design: single plane cable stayed bridge
- Total length: 1,708 m (5,604 ft)
- Width: 740 m (2,430 ft)
- Longest span: 500 m (1,600 ft)

History
- Designer: Government of Malaysia; Malaysian Highway Authority (LLM); Ranhill Engineers & Constructors Sdn Bhd
- Constructed by: Ranhill Engineers & Constructors Sdn Bhd
- Construction start: 2005; 21 years ago
- Opened: 10 June 2011; 14 years ago

Location
- Interactive map of Sungai Johor Bridge

The Sungai Johor Bridge (Malay: Jambatan Sungai Johor; Chinese: 柔佛河大桥; Jawi: جمبتن سوڠاي جوهر) is an expressway bridge across Johor River on Senai–Desaru Expressway in Johor, Malaysia. The 1.7 km (1,708 m) single plane cable stayed bridge connects Pulau Juling in Johor Bahru District in the west to Tanjung Penyabong in Kota Tinggi District in the east. Opened on 10 June 2011, it has the longest central span of any river bridge in Malaysia, followed by Batang Sadong Bridge in Sarawak. The bridge is also the longest single plane cable-stayed bridge in Malaysia.

== History ==
Construction officially began in 2005. Construction was led by Senai Desaru Expressway Berhad with a main contractor Ranhill Engineers & Constructors Sdn Bhd. The bridge was to have been completed by December 2008, but opening of the bridge was repeatedly delayed, opening together with the 2nd phase of the expressway on 10 June 2011.

== Specifications ==
The bridge is 1,708 metres (1.7 km) long, with a 500-metre (0.5 km) main span across the Johor River. The two main pylons of the bridge rise to a height of 143 meters.

The expressway on the bridge has two lanes on each direction, without any shoulder.

== Gallery ==
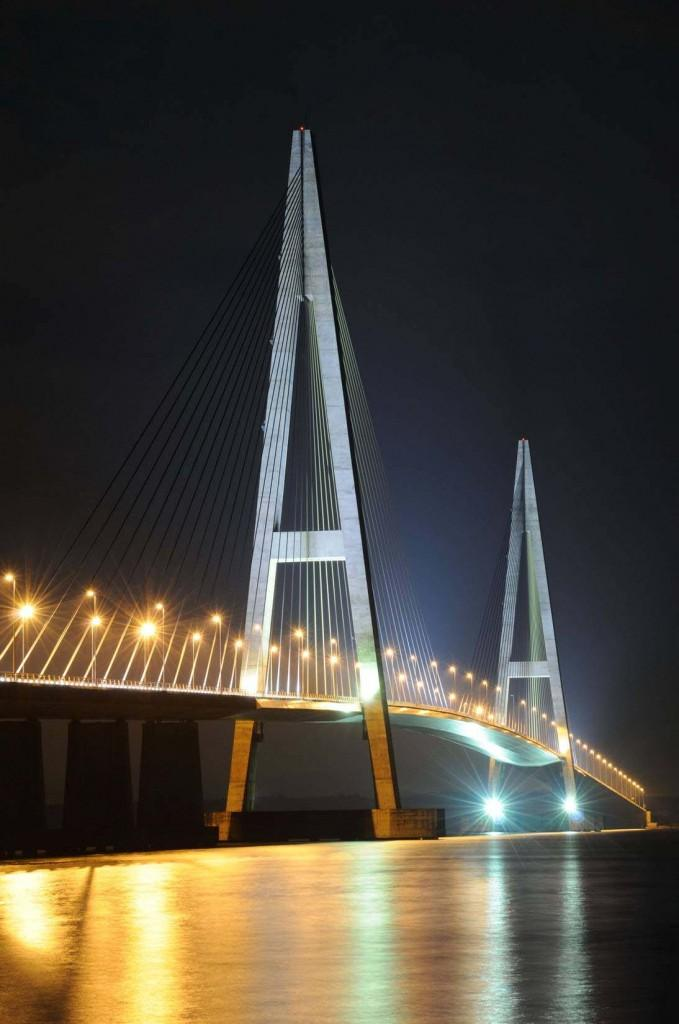
Sungai Johor Bridge at night

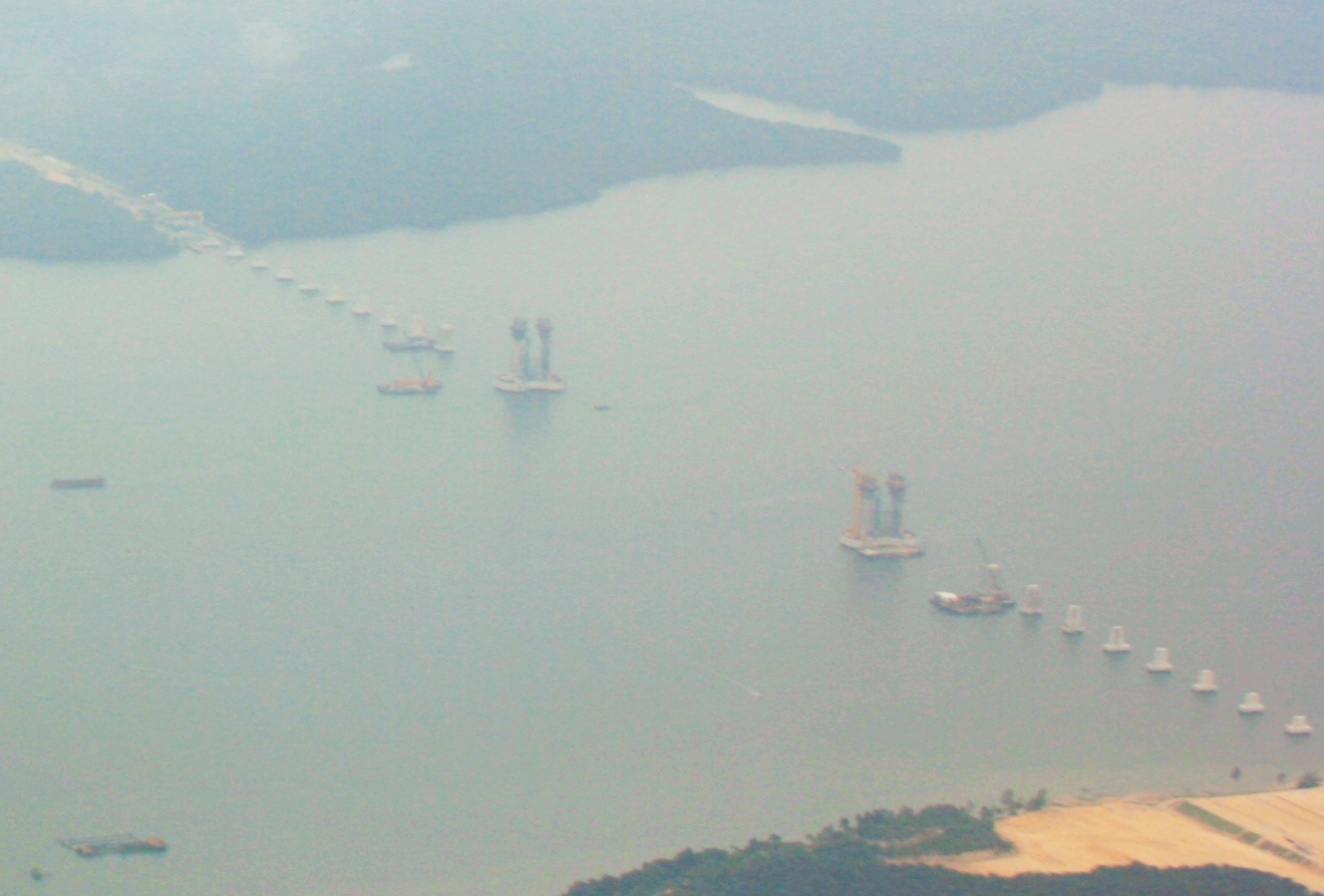
The Sungai Johor Bridge under construction in October 2007

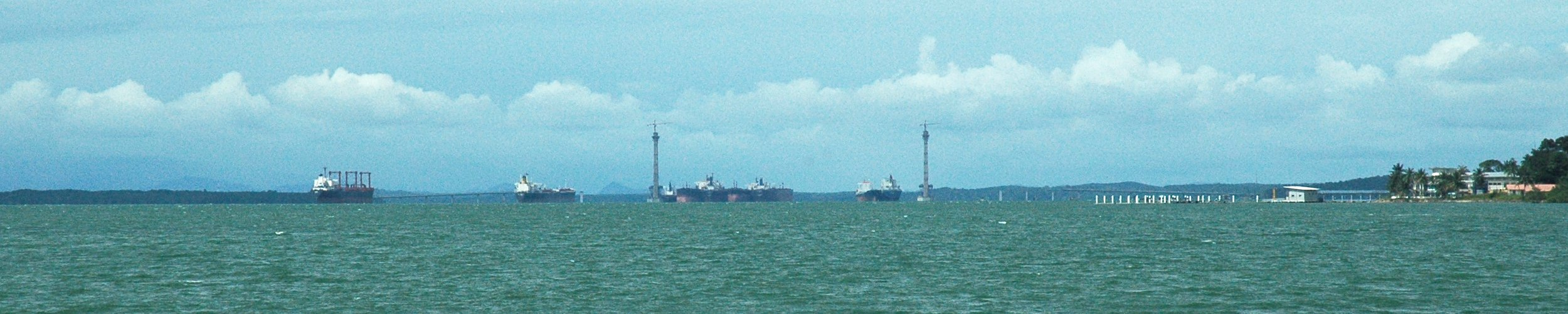
The Sungai Johor Bridge under construction in January 2009

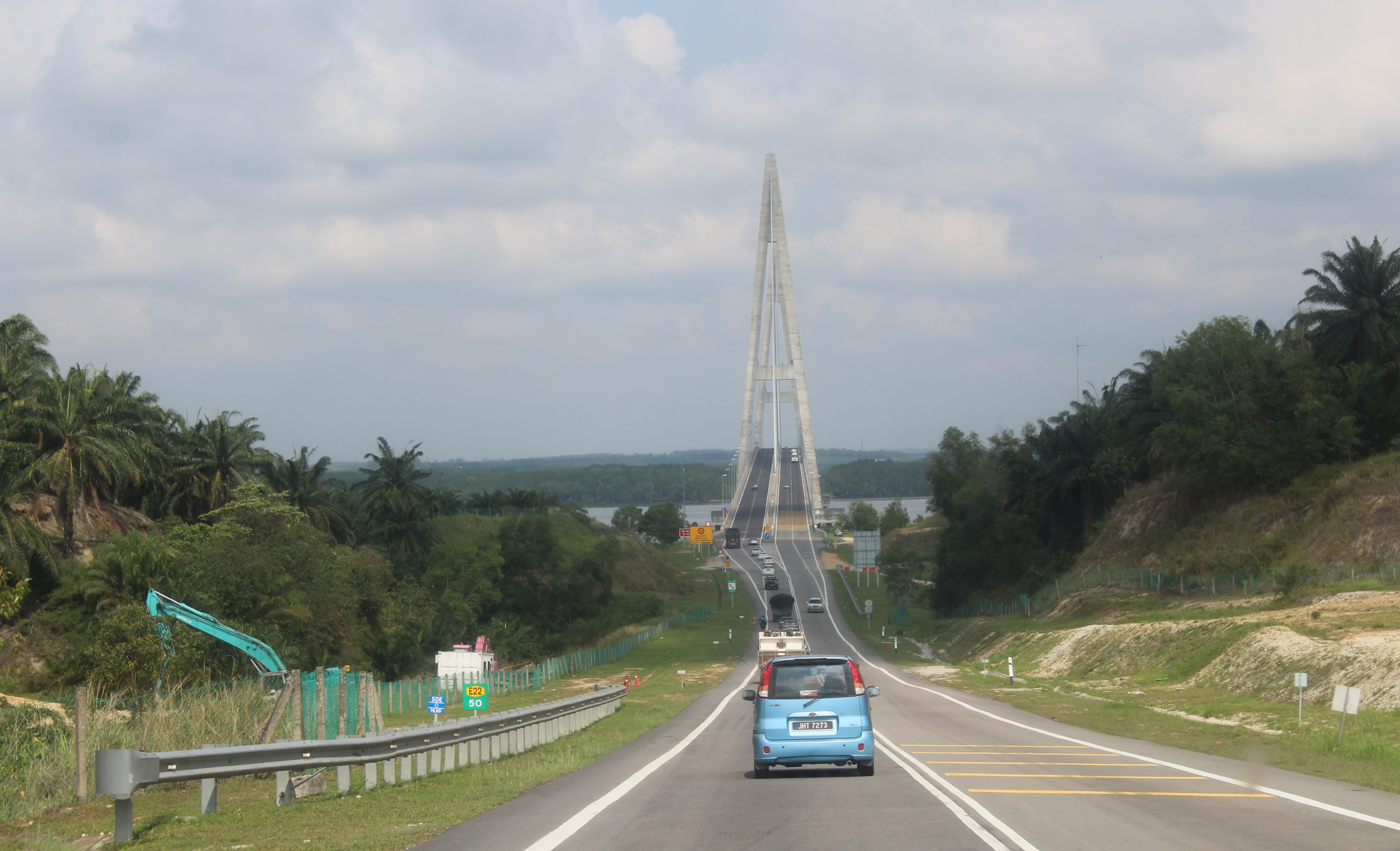
The Sungai Johor Bridge as seen from the westbound of Senai–Desaru Expressway in May 2016

== See also ==
- List of longest cable-stayed bridge spans
