= Senai–Desaru Expressway =

Turnpike in Johore, Malaysia

Expressway 22
- Senai–Desaru Expressway; Lebuhraya Senai–Desaru 士乃–迪沙鲁大道
- SDE in red

Route information
- Maintained by Senai-Desaru Expressway Berhad (SDEB)
- Length: 77 km (48 mi)
- Existed: 2005–present
- History: Completed on 10 June 2011

Major junctions
- West end: Senai
- Second Link Expressway / AH143; FT 16 Senai Airport Highway FT 3 (Johor Bahru–Kota Tinggi Highway) / AH18; FT 17 Tanjung Langsat Highway; FT 92 Pengerang Highway
- East end: Desaru

Location
- Country: Malaysia
- Primary destinations: Senai, Ulu Tiram, Pasir Gudang, Bandar Penawar, Sungai Rengit, Pengerang, Desaru

Highway system
- Highways in Malaysia; Expressways; Federal; State

E22 Senai–Desaru Expressway (SDE; Malay: Lebuhraya Senai–Desaru; Chinese: 士乃–迪沙鲁大道), is an expressway in Johor, Malaysia. It connects Senai in central Johor to Desaru in eastern Johor. Measuring a total length of 77 km (48 mi), it is the third east–west-oriented expressway in the Iskandar Malaysia area after the Pasir Gudang Highway and the Pontian–Johor Bahru Parkway of the Second Link Expressway. With a new crossing over the Johor River, when opened on 10 June 2011, the expressway shortened travel time from Senai to Desaru from 2.5 hours to one hour.

The Kilometre Zero of the expressway is located at Senai Main Interchange at Senai.

== History ==
The Johor Bahru–Kota Tinggi Highway (Federal Route 3) and Pengerang Highway (Federal Route 92) used to be the only gateway to Desaru, with a typical journey of 2.5 hours. Construction of the expressway began in 2005. The construction was led by Senai–Desaru Expressway Berhad with a main contractor, Ranhill Engineers & Constructors Sdn Bhd. Phase 1 of the expressway linking Senai to Pasir Gudang was opened to traffic on 10 September 2009, and the remaining stretch from Pasir Gudang to Desaru, including the bridge, opened on 10 June 2011.

On 12 December 2017, former Works Minister Fadillah Yusof had announced that the government approved to allocate RM390 million to upgrade and expand the 26 km stretch from Cahaya Baru to the Bandar Penawar intersection into dual carriageway. However, a session was held on 17 July 2018 between the Finance Ministry, the Works Ministry and the Economic Planning Unit to identify the list of Works Ministry projects that had not been issued acceptance letters, as well as the project savings. Following this session, Johor's State Public Works, Infrastructure and Transportation Committee chairman Mazlan Bujang said the federal government had postponed this project on 9 December 2018. However on 1 November 2024, the SDE's upgrade was proceeded after Kimlun Berhad was awarded the contract to complete this upgrade by 2027.

== Features ==
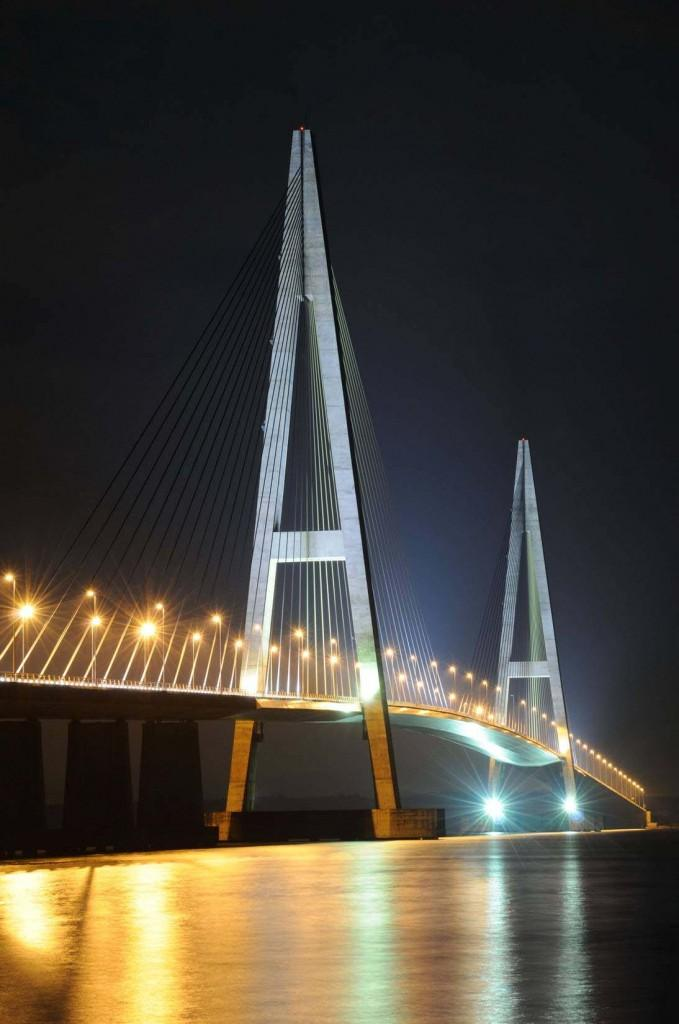
The Sungai Johor Bridge on the Senai-Desaru Expressway, Johor, the longest river bridge in Malaysia as well as the longest single plane cable-stayed bridge in Malaysia.

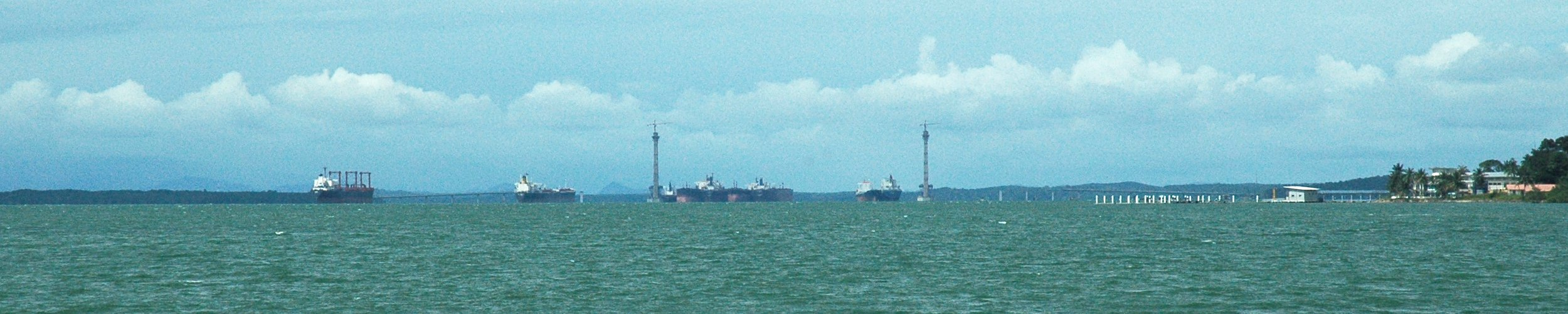
The Sungai Johor Bridge under construction in January 2009

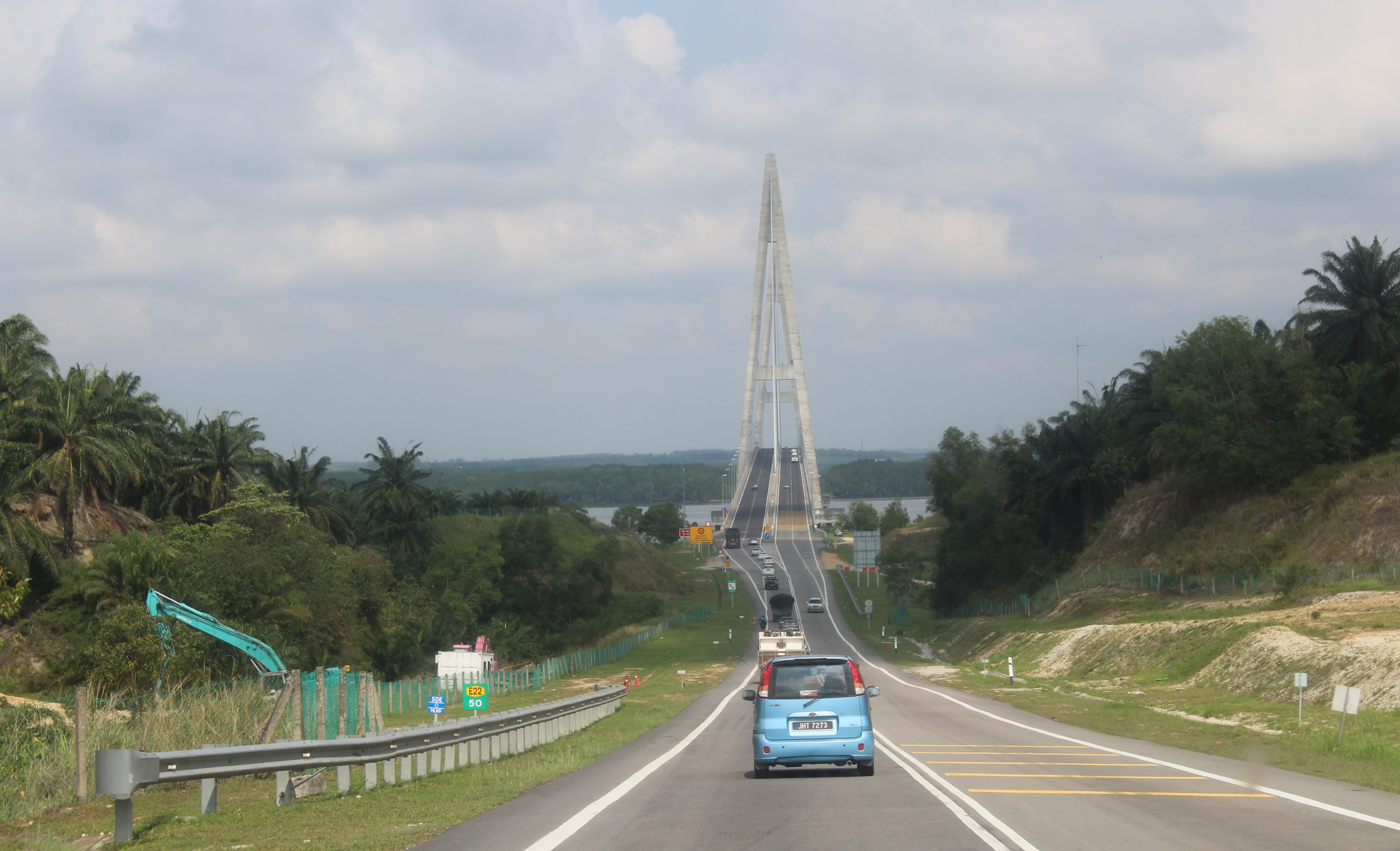
Sungai Johor Bridge at Senai–Desaru Expressway seen from westbound

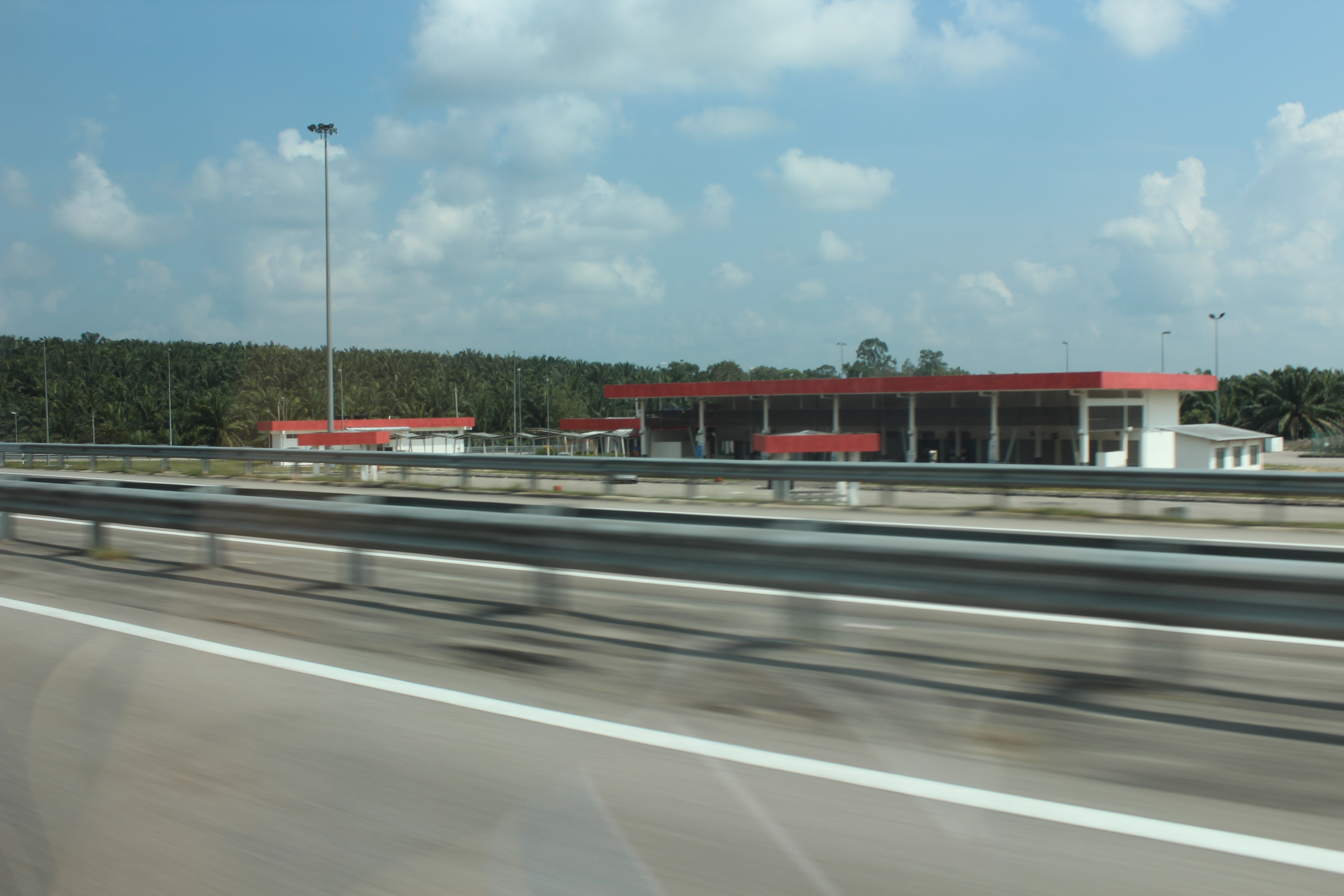
Layang R&R Eastbound at Senai–Desaru Expressway seen from westbound

The tolled expressway is a combination of a four-lane dual carriageway (Senai–Cahaya Baru section) and a two-lane single carriageway (Cahaya Baru–Penawar section), which improves road connection between western and eastern Johor. It features a closed toll system like the North–South Expressway. It is also an alternative route to Desaru Beach, instead of Federal Route 3 and Federal Route 92 from Johor Bahru and Singapore. The highway has become the main access road to Desaru from North–South Expressway Southern Route E2 and a major road link to Senai International Airport from Kota Tinggi and eastern parts of Johor. Construction of the road included the 1.7 kilometre Sungai Johor Bridge, the longest single plane cable stayed bridge in Malaysia across Johor River, which became the longest river bridge in Malaysia after Batang Sadong Bridge in Sarawak.

The section between Cahaya Baru and Penawar is built as a two-lane expressway (except the Sungai Johor-SDE bridge) while retaining the full access control, making the section as the first true two-lane expressway with full access control in Malaysia.

There is a water catchment area located along Sungai Layang sections near the Sultan Iskandar Reservoir. Senai–Desaru Expressway traverses through the environmentally sensitive water catchment area of Sultan Iskandar Reservoir. Senai–Desaru Expressway is the only expressway in Malaysia which features the Pollutant Removal System (PRS). The expressway took one step higher by introducing the PRS to monitor and control any potential impact to the water quality in Sultan Iskandar Reservoir in the event of a spillage of dangerous and hazardous chemicals from any vehicle travelling on the expressway.

The Senai–Desaru Expressway's default speed limit on the expressway is 110 km/h (68 mph), but there are some exceptions in some places for several reasons, including:-

- Cahaya Baru interchange–Penawar: 90 km/h (56 mph) (two-lane sections)
- Senai Main Interchange–Senai Town interchange: 80 km/h (50 mph) (due to high traffic capacity)
- 1 km before every toll plaza: 60 km/h (37 mph) or 50 km/h (31 mph) (to help the traffic to slow down)
- Penawar intersections: 60 km/h (37 mph) (at-grade junctions)

== Toll systems ==
The Senai–Desaru Expressway uses the closed toll system. Beginning 9 November 2016, all electronic toll transactions have been conducting using Touch 'n Go and SmartTAGs.

=== Toll rates ===
Class	Type of vehicles	Rate (in Malaysian Ringgit (RM)) up to
0	Motorcycles (Vehicles with two axles and two wheels)	Free
1	Private Cars (Vehicles with two axles and three or four wheels (excluding taxis and buses))	9.20
2	Vans and other small goods vehicles (Vehicles with two axles and six wheels (excluding buses))	13.80
3	Large Trucks (Vehicles with three or more axles (excluding buses))	18.40
4	Taxis	4.60
5	Buses	5.70

== Interchange lists ==
The entire route is located in Johor.

Legend:

- I/C - Interchange, I/S - Intersection, RSA - Rest and service area, OBR - Overhead bridge restaurant, R/R - Restaurant and rest plaza, L/B - Layby, V/P - Vista point, TN - tunnel, T/P - Toll plaza, BR - Bridge
- C - Cloverleaf, S - Stack, T-A - Trumpet-A, T-B - Trumpet-B, DT - Directional-T/Y, SDT - Semi-Directional-T/Y, P-Y - Partial-Y, D - Diamond, P-C - Partial cloverleaf, D-D - Diverging diamond, D-R - Direct ramp

=== Main Link ===
District	Location	km	mi	Exit	Name	Destinations	Notes
Kulai	Senai	0.0	0.0	2201	Senai Main I/C	Second Link Expressway / AH143 – Tuas (Singapore), Gelang Patah, Kuala Lumpur, Malacca, Senai International Airport, Senai Industrial Area	Trumpet interchange
Kulai	Senai			Sungai Skudai bridge			
Kulai	Senai			2202	Senai Town I/C	FT 16 Senai Airport Highway – Senai, Kulai, Johor Bahru	
Kulai	Senai			Senai Toll Plaza			
Johor Bahru	Johor Bahru			Sungai Skudai bridge			
Johor Bahru	Johor Bahru	19.0	11.8	Pipeline crossing bridge			
Johor Bahru	Johor Bahru			2204	Ulu Tiram I/C	FT 3 / AH18 Johor Bahru–Kota Tinggi Highway – Ulu Tiram, Johor Bahru, Woodlands (Singapore), Kota Tinggi, Mersing; SDEB operation office	Trumpet interchange
Johor Bahru	Johor Bahru	29.5– 30.5	18.3– 19.0	Layang RSA, Shell (both bounds; separated)			
Johor Bahru	Johor Bahru			Sungai Layang viaduct Water catchment area			
Johor Bahru	Pasir Gudang			2205	Cahaya Baru I/C	Senai–Desaru Expressway (Pasir Gudang Link) – Cahaya Baru, Kong Kong, Masai, Pasir Gudang, Tanjung Langsat, Johor Port	Trumpet interchange
Johor Bahru	Pasir Gudang			Selat Mendana bridge			
Johor Bahru	Pasir Gudang	47.0	29.2		Pulau Juling		
Johor Bahru–Kota Tinggi district border		48.0	29.8	Sungai Johor Bridge; Length: 1.7 km (1.1 mi)			
Kota Tinggi	Pengerang				Tanjung Penyabong		
Kota Tinggi	Pengerang			Sungai Layau bridge			
Kota Tinggi	Pengerang			Sungai Semenchu bridge			
Kota Tinggi	Pengerang			Sungai Papan bridge			
Kota Tinggi	Pengerang			Penawar Toll Plaza			
Kota Tinggi	Pengerang	69.4	43.1	2212	Penawar I/S	FT 92 Pengerang Highway – Kota Tinggi, Desaru, Bandar Penawar, Sungai Rengit, Pengerang, Tanjung Pengelih	Signalised at-grade intersection
1.000 mi = 1.609 km; 1.000 km = 0.621 mi: Electronic toll collection

=== Pasir Gudang Link ===
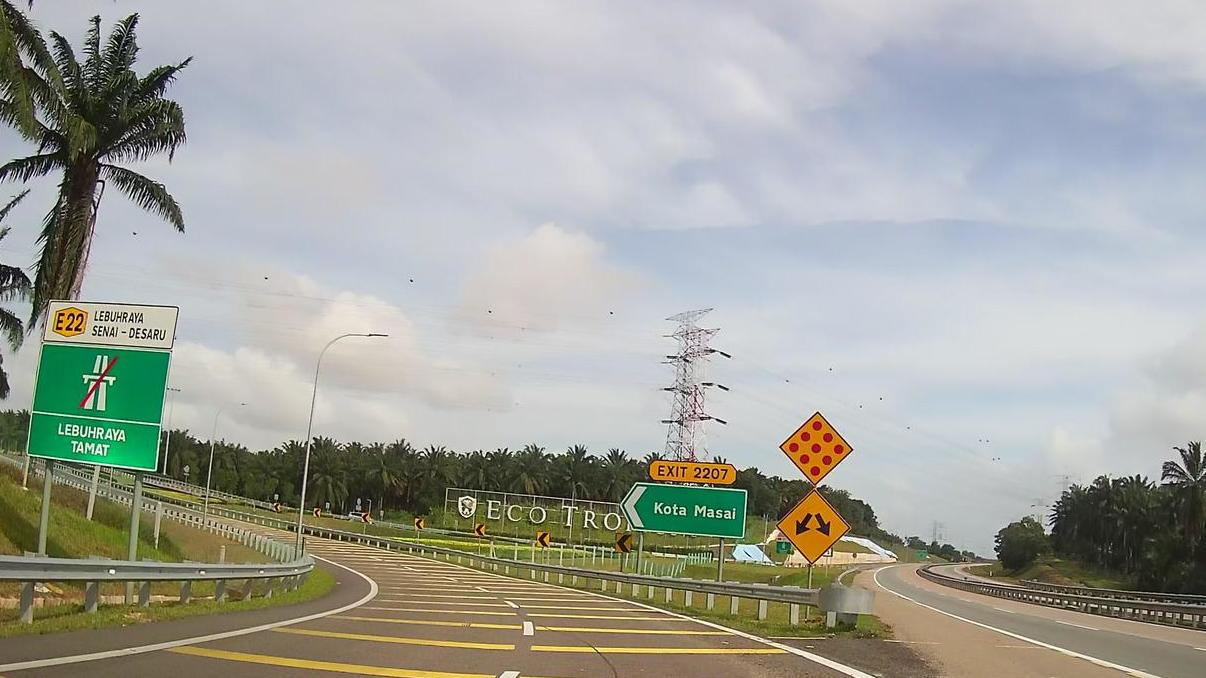
New 2207 Kota Masai exit developed by Eco Tropics

The entire route is in Pasir Gudang subdistrict, Johor Bahru District, Johor.

Location	km	mi	Exit	Name	Destinations	Notes
Cahaya Baru			2205	Cahaya Baru I/C	Senai–Desaru Expressway (Main Link) – Johor Bahru, Senai, Senai International Airport, Kuala Lumpur, Desaru, Bandar Penawar	Trumpet interchange
Cahaya Baru			Cahaya Baru Toll Plaza			
Cahaya Baru			2205A	Masai I/C	J10 Johor State Route J10 – Masai, Kong Kong, Cahaya Baru	
Kota Masai			2207	Kota Masai I/C	Jalan Kota Masai – Jalan Kota Masai	Left-in/left-out
Tanjung Langsat			2210	Pasir Gudang I/C	FT 17 Tanjung Langsat Highway – Pasir Gudang, Johor Bahru, Plentong, Tanjung Langsat, Johor Port	Trumpet interchange
1.000 mi = 1.609 km; 1.000 km = 0.621 mi: Electronic toll collection; Incomplete access
