= Bandar Mas =

Coordinates: 1°36′45.5″N 104°08′25.0″E

- Settlement Town
- Location in Malaysia
- Country: Malaysia
- State: Johor
- District: Kota Tinggi

Bandar Mas is a settlement town in Kota Tinggi District, Johor, Malaysia. This town is located between Pengerang Highway (Federal Route 92) and Federal Route 99.
