= FELDA Lok Heng =

Human settlement in Malaysia

Coordinates: 1°41′51.5″N 104°06′48.5″E

FELDA Lok Heng is a settlement town in Kota Tinggi District, Johor, Malaysia.

== List of settlements ==
- FELDA Lok Heng Barat
- FELDA Lok Heng Selatan
- FELDA Lok Heng Timur
- FELDA Lok Heng Utara (tiada penduduk dan kawasan tersebut dijadikan kawasan pertanian setempat)
