= Tanjung Balau Fishermen Museum =

Museum in Kota Tinggi, Johor, Malaysia

- Muzium Nelayan Tanjung Balau
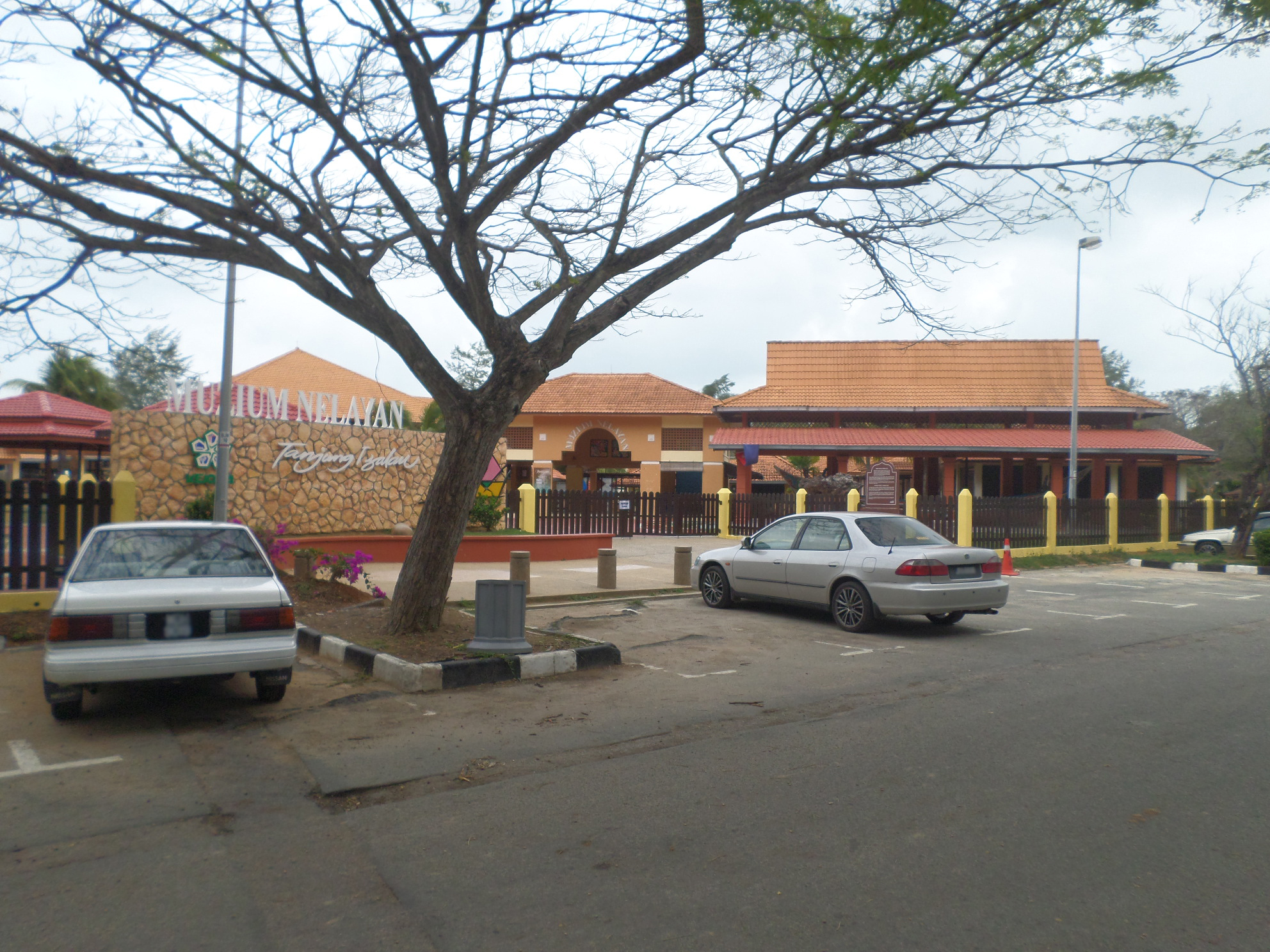
- Established: 1992
- Location: Kota Tinggi, Johor, Malaysia
- Coordinates: 1°36′52.1″N 104°15′26.3″E
- Type: museum

The Tanjung Balau Fishermen Museum (Malay: Muzium Nelayan Tanjung Balau) is a museum in Tanjung Balau, Kota Tinggi District, Johor, Malaysia about fishermen.

== History ==
The construction of the museum began on 20 August 1990 and completed on 8 July 1992 with a total cost of MYR1.48 million which consisted of one main building. In 1997, a souvenir shop was built to be part of the museum. In 2005, the museum was upgraded to include three new galleries.

== Architecture ==
The museum consists of four galleries, which are geology, sea safety, Desaru shipwreck and special exhibition.

== Exhibitions ==
The museum exhibits around 250 artifacts of fishermen equipment. It also displays more than 50 fishermen ships.

== See also ==
- List of museums in Malaysia
