= Lok Heng =

Coordinates: 1.6986326°N 104.1021568°E

Lok Heng is a small town in Kota Tinggi District, Johor, Malaysia. It is located between Bandar Mas and Waha.
