= Pasir Gogok =

- Town in Malaysia
- Pasir Gogok in Johor, Malay Peninsular and Malaysia Pasir Gogok (Peninsular Malaysia) Pasir Gogok (Malaysia)
- Coordinates: 1°25′N 104°06′E
- Country: Malaysia
- State: Johor
- District: Kota Tinggi
- Elevation: 10 m (33 ft)
- Time zone: UTC+8 (MYT)
- Postal code: 81630

Pasir Gogok is a small village in Kota Tinggi District, Johor, Malaysia.
