= Senai Airport Highway =

Road in Malaysia

Federal Route 16
- Senai Airport Highway (Jalan Lapangan Terbang Senai)

Route information
- Maintained by Malaysian Public Works Department
- Length: 4.82 km (3.00 mi)
- Existed: 1970–present
- History: Completed in 1973

Major junctions
- North end: Senai International Airport
- Second Link Expressway; Senai–Desaru Expressway; J8 State Route J8; FT 1 Skudai Highway
- South end: Senai

Location
- Country: Malaysia
- Primary destinations: Kampung Maju Jaya

Highway system
- Highways in Malaysia; Expressways; Federal; State

Senai Airport Highway or Jalan Lapangan Terbang Senai, Federal Route 16 is a major highway in Kulai District, Johor, Malaysia that connects Senai International Airport to Senai, which from there connected to Johor Bahru via Federal Route 1 Skudai Highway.

== Route background ==
The Kilometre Zero of the Senai Airport Highway is located at Senai, Johor, at its interchange with the Skudai Highway (Federal Route 1), the main trunk road of the central of Peninsular Malaysia.

== History ==
The highway was constructed in 1970. In 1973, the highway was opened to traffic while the Senai Airport began operations, as well.

== Features ==
At most sections, the Federal Route 16 was built under the JKR U5 road standard, with a speed limit of 70 km/h.

== Junction lists ==
Legend:

- I/C - Interchange, I/S - Intersection, RSA - Rest and service area, OBR - Overhead bridge restaurant, R/R - Restaurant and rest plaza, L/B - Layby, V/P - Vista point, TN - tunnel, T/P - Toll plaza, BR - Bridge
- C - Cloverleaf, S - Stack, T-A - Trumpet-A, T-B - Trumpet-B, DT - Directional-T/Y, SDT - Semi-Directional-T/Y, P-Y - Partial-Y, D - Diamond, P-C - Partial cloverleaf, D-D - Diverging diamond, D-R - Direct ramp

Km	Exit	Name	Destinations	Notes
0.0	1601	Senai; Senai Airport Highway I/C	FT 1 Skudai Highway – Ayer Hitam, Simpang Renggam, Kulai, Pontian, Skudai, Johor Bahru, Gelang Patah	Multi-tier flyover interchange
	BR	Railway crossing bridge		
	BR	Sungai Skudai bridge		
	1602	Senai-SDE I/C	Senai–Desaru Expressway – Ulu Tiram, Kota Tinggi, Johor Bahru (Tebrau), Pasir Gudang, Bandar Penawar, Desaru	Trumpet interchange
	1603	Jalan Seelong I/C	Jalan Bintang Utama 1 – Taman Bintang Utama, Taman Seri Senai, Econsave Senai; J8 Johor State Route J8 – Seelong, Kampung Maju Jaya, Taman Bintang, Taman Handal, Taman Sempena, Taman Senai Jaya	T-junctions
		Taman Seri Senai	Taman Seri Senai	Senai Airport bound
	1604	Senai Industrial Area I/C	Second Link Expressway (Senai Link) – Kuala Lumpur, Tuas (Singapore), Johor Bahru (Pandan), Johor Premium Outlets; Jalan Perindustrian – Senai Industrial Area	Diamond interchange
		Senai Industrial Area	Senai Industrial Area	Senai Airport bound
	1605A	Senai Industrial Area Exit A	Persiaran Cyber – Senai Industrial Area	Senai Airport bound
	1605B	Senai Industrial Area Exit B	Jalan Cyber 1 – Senai Industrial Area	Senai Airport bound
4.0	–	–		
	L/B	Petronas L/B	Petronas	Senai bound
		Senai Airport Mosque	Senai Airport Mosque	Senai Airport bound
4.5	1606	Lapangan Terbang Sultan Ismail I/S	Jalan Jumbo – Hotel Sofitel, Palm Resort Golf and Country Club, MAS complex, MAS hangar, Air Asia hangar, DCA southern headquarters, SATS main headquarters, Senai Airport Quarters, Bandar Putra Kulai, Hutan Bandar Kulai	Roundabout
4.8		Senai International Airport; Senai Aero Mall	Senai International Airport (Sultan Ismail Airport) – Main Terminal Building, Arrival/Departure, Senai Aero Mall	
