= Kota Tinggi Museum =

Museum in Kota Tinggi, Johor, Malaysia

- Muzium Kota Tinggi
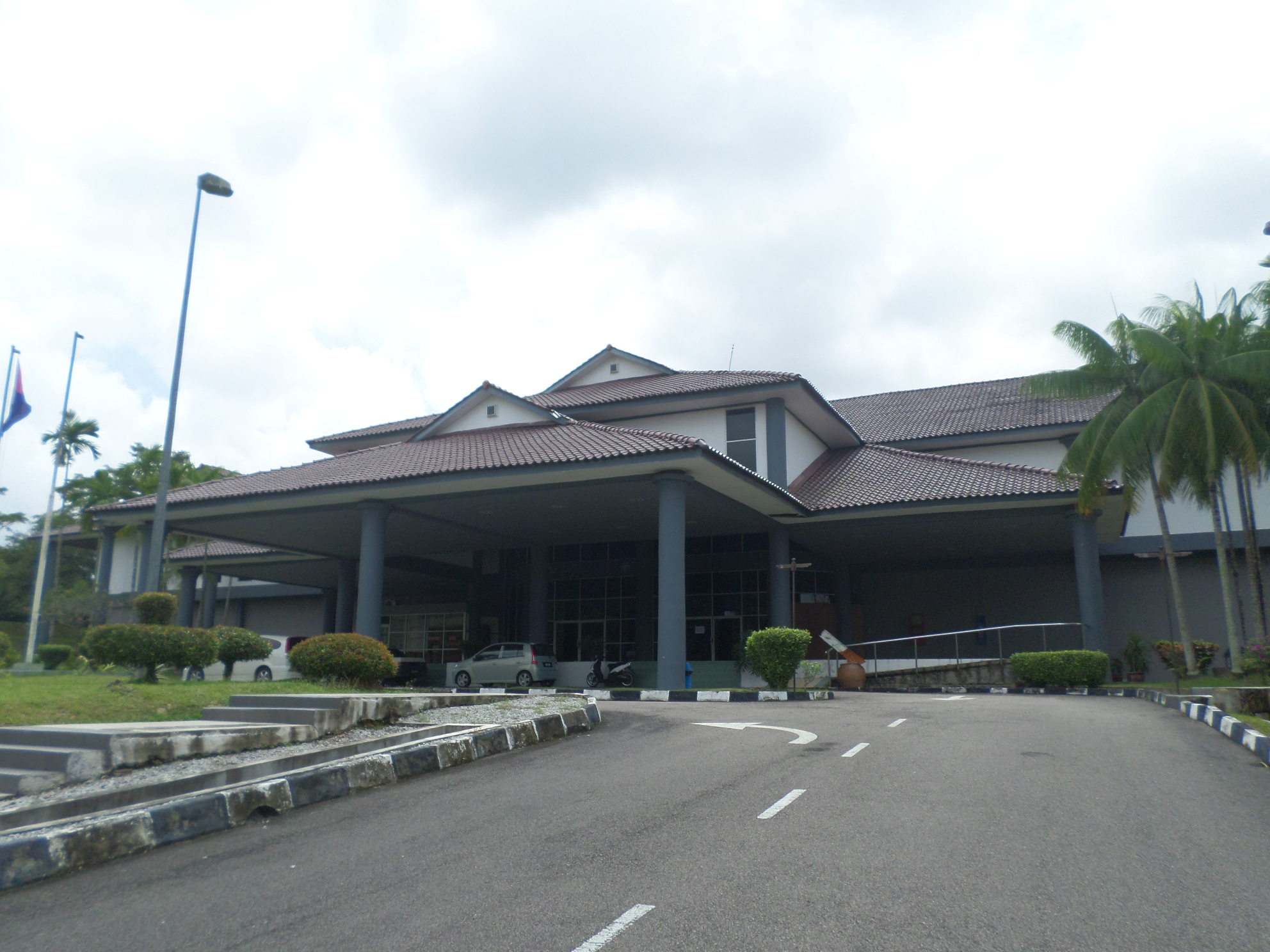
- Established: 2002
- Location: Kota Tinggi, Johor, Malaysia
- Coordinates: 1°44′14.0″N 103°54′43.6″E
- Type: museum

The Kota Tinggi Museum (Malay: Muzium Kota Tinggi) is a museum in Kota Tinggi Town, Kota Tinggi District, Johor, Malaysia. The museum is about the history of Johor Sultanate.

== History ==
The museum was constructed in 1997 and opened in 2002. In 2019, the museum was reopened with an additional section of an art gallery after it was closed down for almost six years for upgrading works.

== Architecture ==
The museum is housed in a two-story building.

== Exhibitions ==
The museum exhibits the history of Johor Lama, archeology artefacts from all of Johor area, old currency, Malay cultural items as well as various weaponry artifacts.

== See also ==
- List of museums in Malaysia
