= Lebam River =

River of Johor, Malaysia

Coordinates: 1°30′N 104°03′E

The Lebam River (Malay: Sungai Lebam) is a river and surrounding wetlands located near Desaru, in the eastern part of the state of Johor, Malaysia. The Johor National Parks Agency (Perbadanan Taman Negara Johor) wants to promote the wetlands as a stopover site according to the Ramsar Convention and for the tourism industry. It is the largest tributary of the Johor River. Visitors may take a boat to explore the wildlife, especially the fireflies living in the mangrove apple trees.
