= FELDA Waha =

Human settlement in Malaysia

FELDA Waha is a settlement town in Kota Tinggi District, Johor, Malaysia.

== List of settlements ==
- FELDA Bukit Waha
- FELDA Simpang Waha
- FELDA Bukit Easter
