= Tanjung Pengelih =

Town in Malaysia

Coordinates: 1°22′9″N 104°5′23″E

Tanjung Pengelih is a small town in Pengerang, Kota Tinggi District, Johor, Malaysia. The Tanjung Pengelih historical British Military Operation Centre fortress during World War II is located here. The Royal Malaysian Naval Academy (PULAREK TLDM) is also in Tanjung Pengelih.

Tanjung Pengelih is also the location of one of Pengerang's two passenger ferry terminals. Operating only on weekends and Fridays, it hosts fast ferry services from the Singapore ports of Changi Point and Tanah Merah, as well as Batam on the Indonesian Riau Islands.
