= Teluk Ramunia =

Human settlement in Malaysia

Coordinates: 1°22′19″N 104°14′51″E

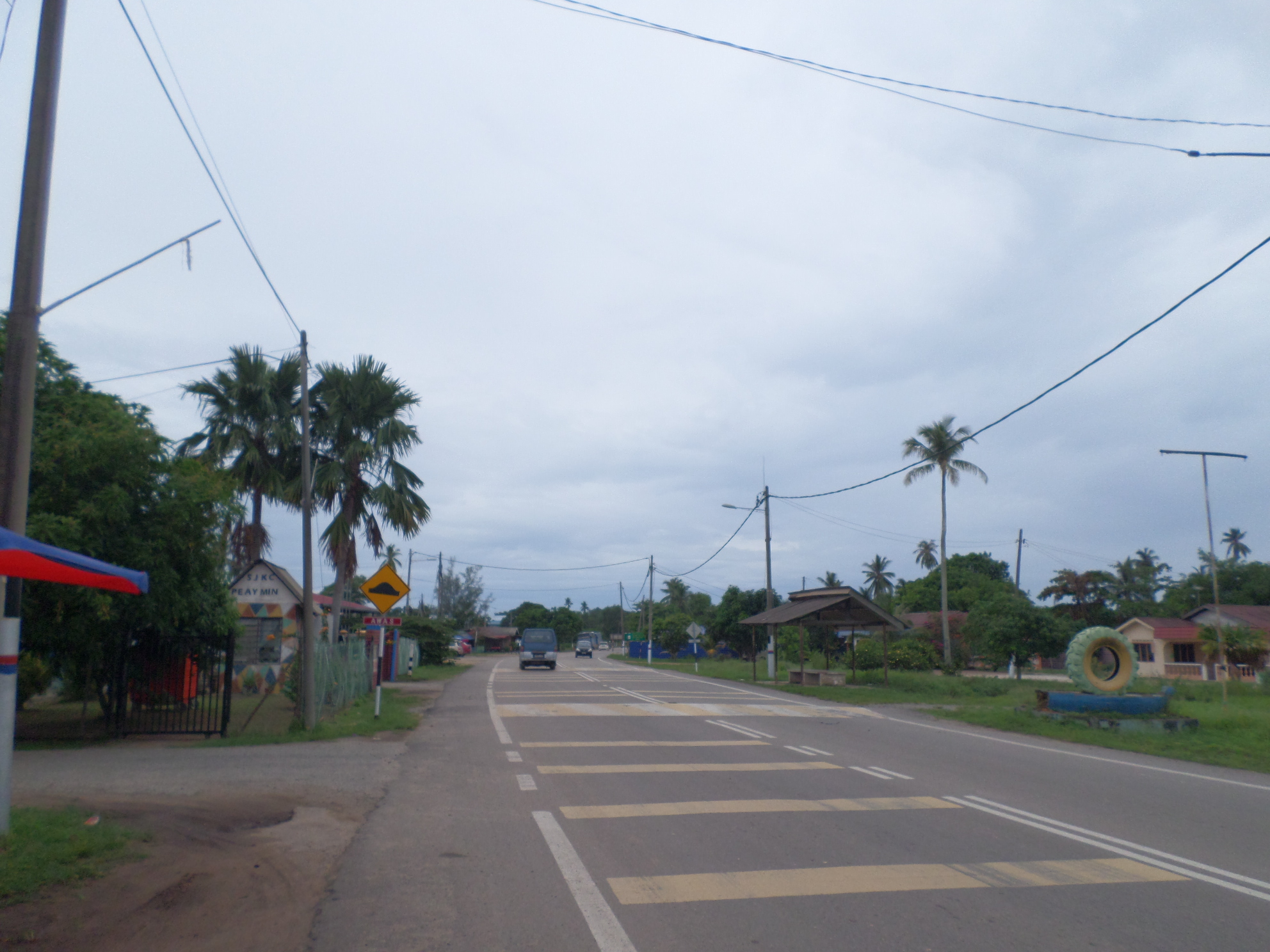
Teluk Ramunia

Teluk Ramunia is a town in Kota Tinggi District, Johor, Malaysia. It is a well-known bauxite mining town in the early days of Malaysia. It is a sight seeing place, good for a family picnic spot. Now it is known for Oil and Gas Fabrication industries.
