= Batang Sadong Bridge =

Batang Sadong Bridge Jambatan Batang Sadong
- Coordinates: 1°26′50″N 110°41′23″E
- Carries: Motor vehicles
- Crosses: Sadong River
- Locale: Jalan Sadong Jaya-Sadong
- Official name: Batang Sadong Bridge
- Maintained by: Sarawak Public Works Department (JKR) Samarahan Division

Characteristics
- Design: Arch box girder bridge
- Total length: 1.48 km

History
- Designer: State Government of Sarawak; Sarawak Public Works Department (JKR); KACC Construction Sdn Bhd
- Constructed by: KACC Construction Sdn Bhd
- Opened: 16 October 2016

Batang Sadong Bridge or Sungai Buloh Bridge (Malay: Jambatan Batang Sadong) is a major bridge connecting Sadong Jaya near Asajaya and Sadong near Simunjan in Samarahan Division, Sarawak, Malaysia. Opened on 16 October 2016, the 1.48 km (1 mi) bridge replaced the ferry service across Batang Sadong river.
