= Teluk Mahkota =

Coordinates: 1°53′N 104°08′E

Teluk Mahkota (also known by its former name Jason's Bay or JB) is a bay and tourism attraction in Sedili, Kota Tinggi District, Johor, Malaysia.

It faces the South China Sea and has a width of approximately 12 km. The bay is situated about 28 km northeast of the town of Kota Tinggi.

At the northern end of the bay is the mouth of Sedili Besar River, flanked on the south bank by the village of Tanjung Sedili and on the north bank by the village of Sedili Besar.

At the southern end of the bay is the mouth of the smaller Sungai Sedili Kechil river and the village of Kampung Sedili Kechil.

The region of the bay is also known locally as Sedili.

The bay was in colonial times known as Jason Bay or Jason's Bay, but was subsequently renamed Teluk Mahkota. The word "teluk" is the geographical term for bay in the Malay language. The word "mahkota" means "crown" in the Malay language and is probably a reference to Tunku Abdul Rahman (Tunku Mahkota of Johor) who was the "Tunku Mahkota" or Crown Prince of Johor from 1961 to 1981.
