= Sedili =

Coastal region in Kota Tinggi, Johor, Malaysia

Coordinates: 1°55′41.7″N 104°06′40.5″E

Sedili or Tanjung Sedili (Jawi: تنجوڠ سديلي) is a coastal region in Kota Tinggi District, Johor, Malaysia. At the eastern end of this region is a bay known as Teluk Mahkota.

At the northern end of Teluk Mahkota bay lies the villages of Tanjung Sedili and Sedili Besar and a river known as Sungai Sedili Besar, whilst at the southern end of the bay lies the village of Sedili Kechil and the river known as Sungai Sedili Kechil.

Administratively, the region comprises the mukims of Sedili Besar and Sedili Kechil.

== Gallery ==
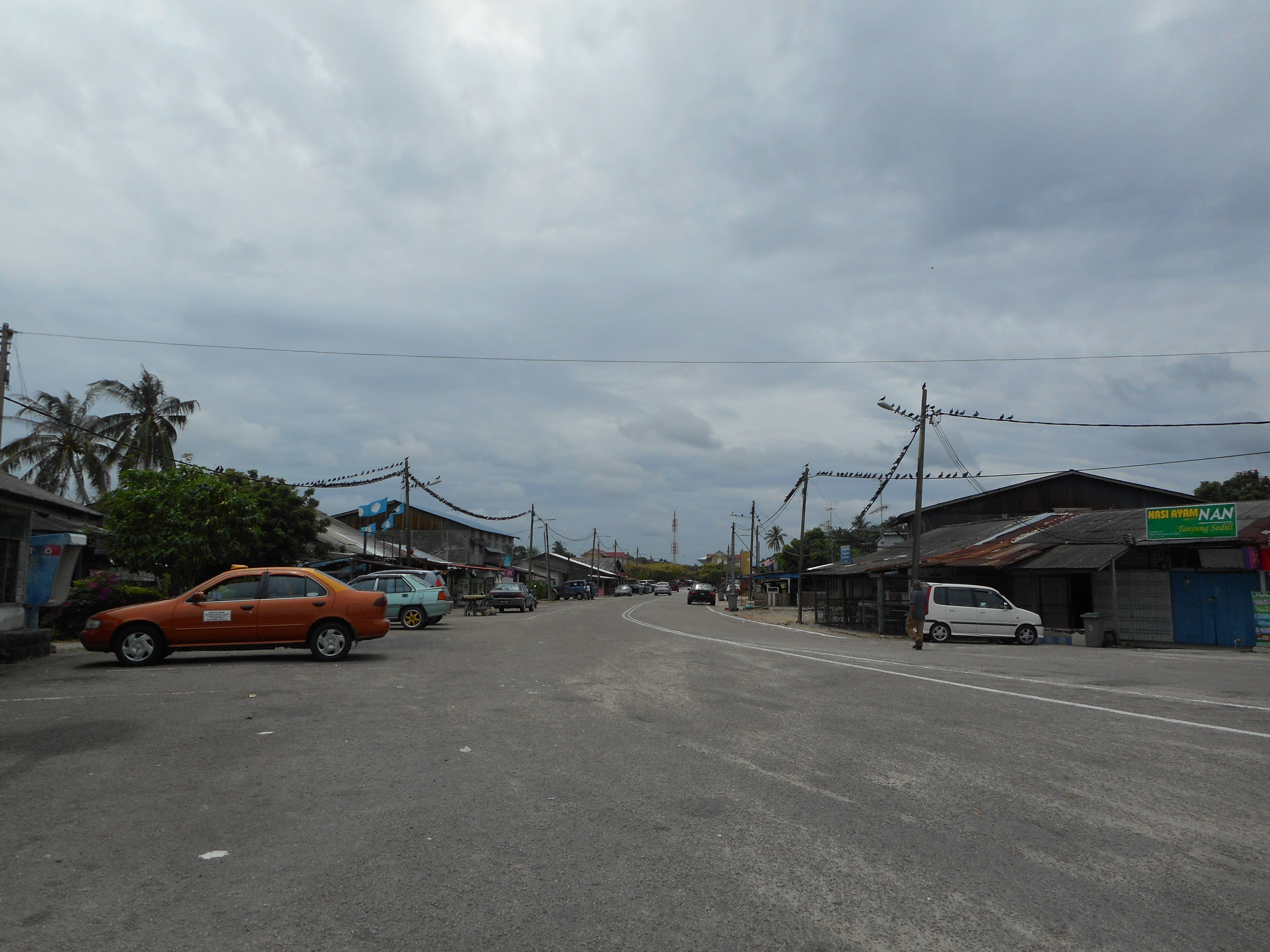
Tanjung Sedili as of 2017

Tanjung Sedili village in Johor, by the south bank of the Sungai Sedili Besar river.

Sedili Kechil village in Johor, by the bank of the Sungai Sedili Kechil river.
