= Teluk Sengat =

Other transcription(s)
  - Jawi: تلوق سڠت
  - Chinese: 南亚港
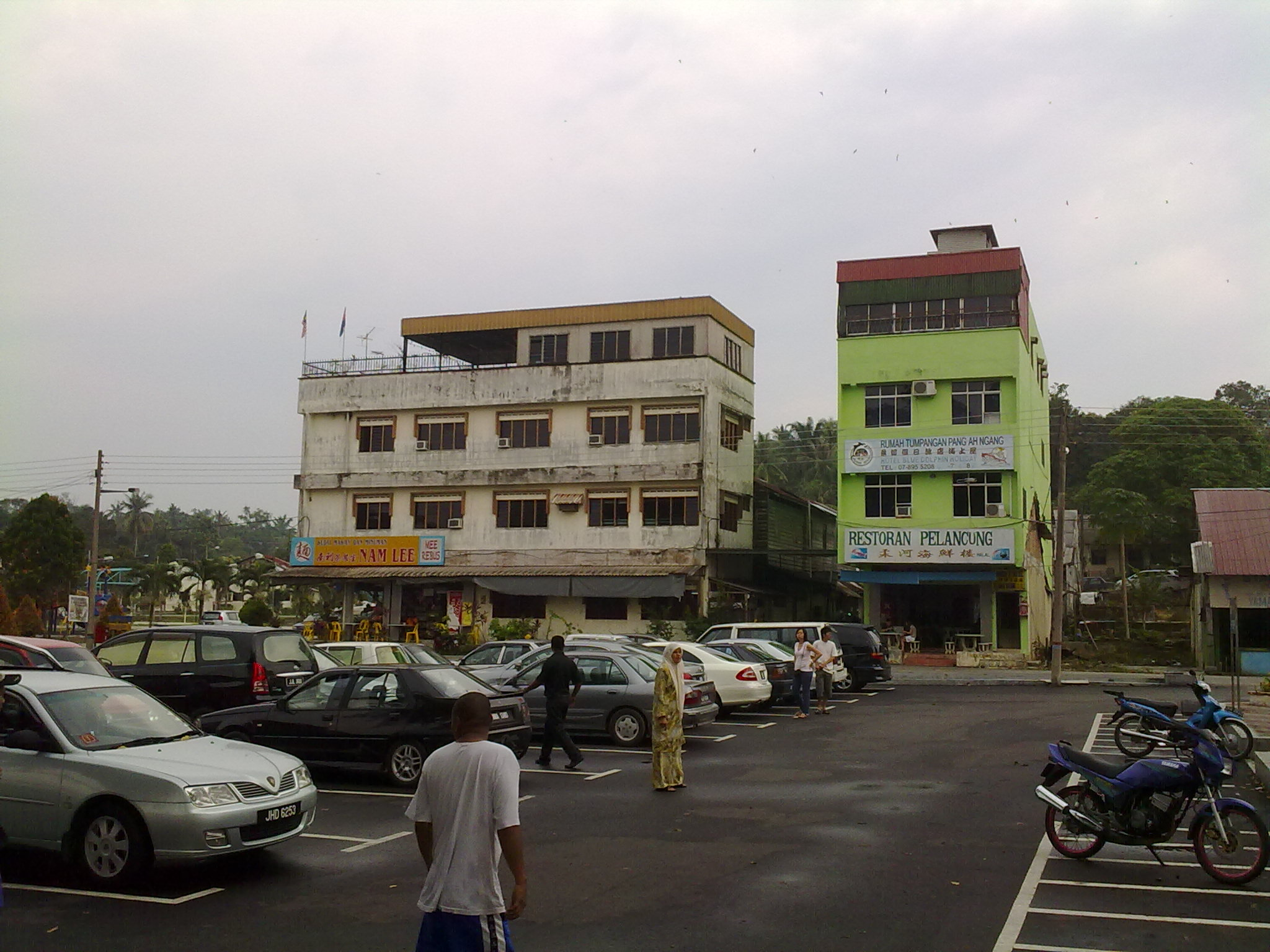
- View of the business buildings in Teluk Sengat
- Interactive map of Teluk Sengat
- Coordinates: 13°50′S 171°45′W
- Country: Malaysia
- State: Johor
- District: Kota Tinggi
- Founded: 1650s
- Became capital: 1959

Area
  - Urban: 23 sq mi (60 km^{2})
- Elevation: 3.3 ft (1 m)

Population (2001)
  - Urban: 58,800
  - Urban density: 2,534.48/sq mi (978.57/km^{2})
- Time zone: UTC−11 (SST)
  - Summer (DST): UTC−10 (HST)

Teluk Sengat is a small town in Kota Tinggi District, Johor, Malaysia. The main economic activity in this town is fishing. There are also palm oil estate nearby and a remote village named Kampung Guntong Nanas.

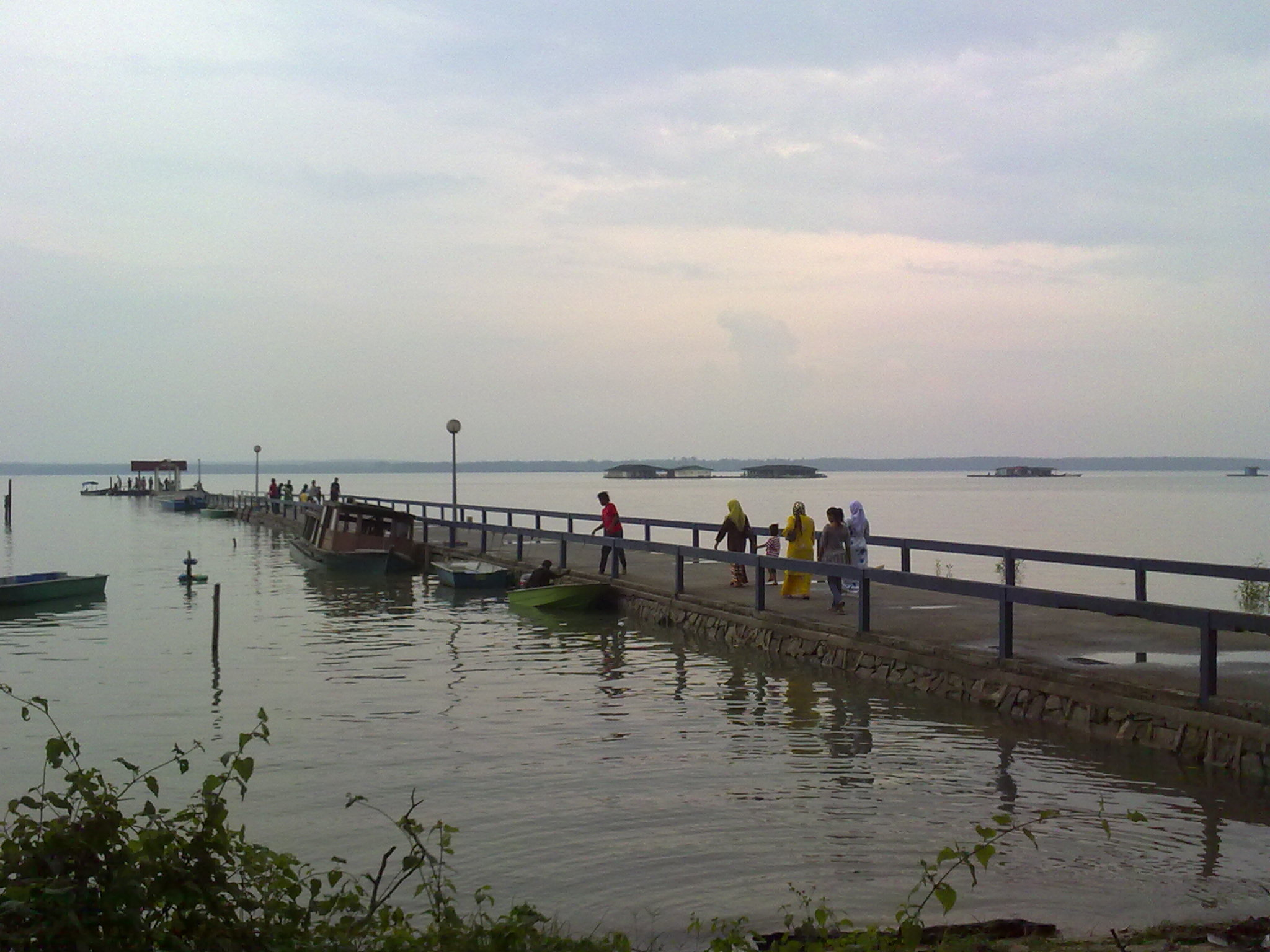
Jetty in Teluk Sengat
