= Bandar Penawar =

Town in Kota Tinggi, Johor, Malaysia

- Town
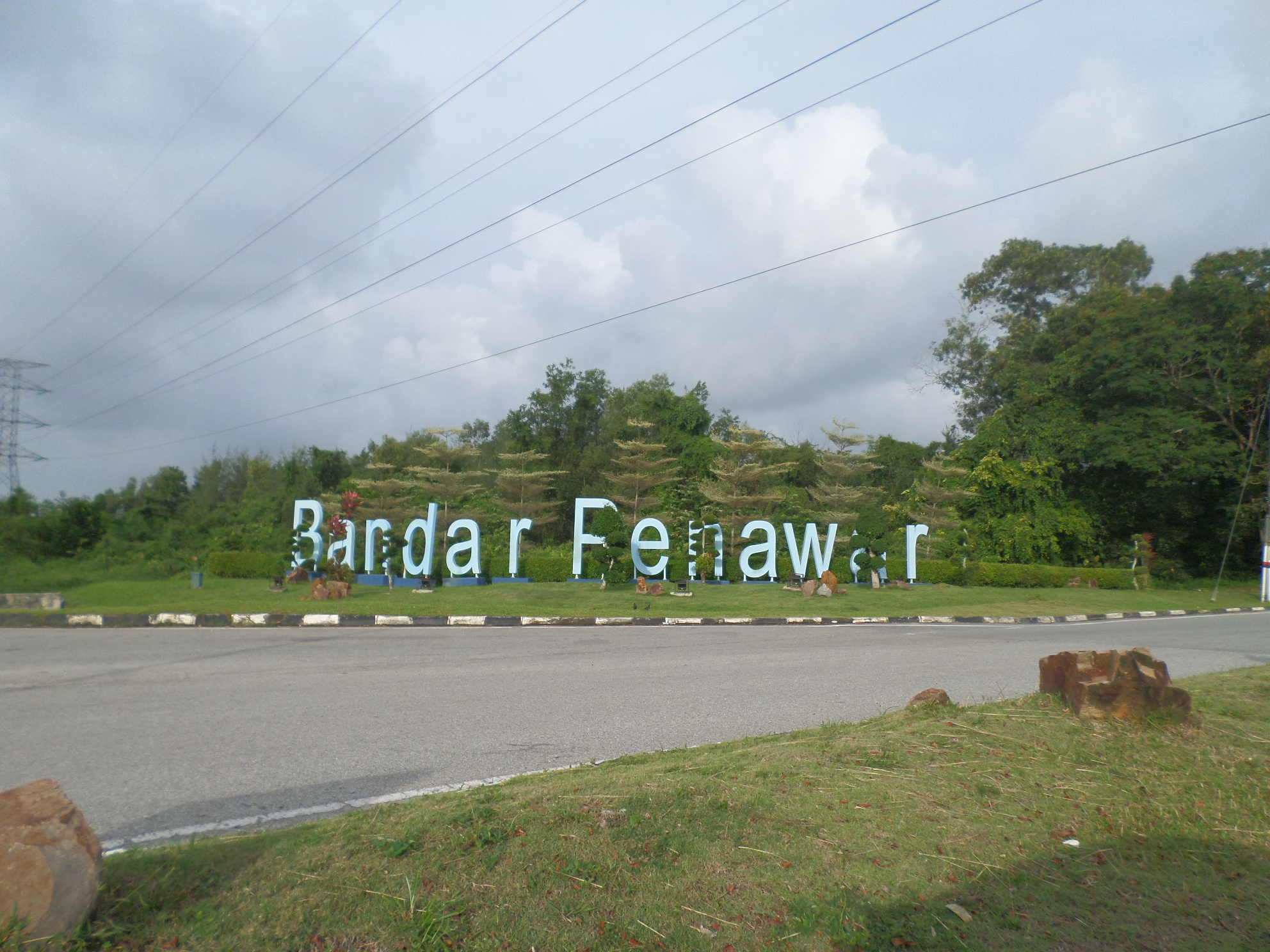
- Interactive map of Bandar Penawar
- Coordinates: 1°33′12″N 104°13′49″E
- Country: Malaysia
- State: Johor
- District: Kota Tinggi

Area
  - Total: 11.5 km^{2} (4.4 sq mi)

Bandar Penawar is a town in Desaru, Pengerang PBT, Kota Tinggi District, Johor, Malaysia.

== History ==
Bandar Penawar was opened on 1979 by Lembaga Kemajuan Johor Tenggara (Southeast Johor Development Authority) (KEJORA)

== Geography ==
The town spans over an area of 11.5 km^{2}.

== Facilities ==
- Lembaga Kemajuan Johor Tenggara (Southeast Johor Development Authority) (KEJORA) main headquarters
- Masjid Jamek Bandar Penawar
- Perpustakaan Awam Bandar Penawar
- Balai Polis Bandar Penawar
- Balai Bomba Bandar Penawar
- Stadium Kejora Bandar Penawar
- Chinese Temples Village (神庙村) - Eight Temples located together at one location
- Ma-Zhu Temple or Fong San Kong (凤山宫)

== Educations ==
- SM Sains Kota Tinggi
- SMK Agama Bandar Penawar
- SMK Bandar Penawar
- SK Bandar Penawar
- SK Bandar Penawar 2
- Sekolah Agama Bandar Penawar
- Sekolah Sukan Tunku Mahkota Ismail
- Kolej Professional Mara
- Kolej Komuniti
- INSTEDT
- Institut Kemahiran Belia Negara (IKBN)

== Transportation ==
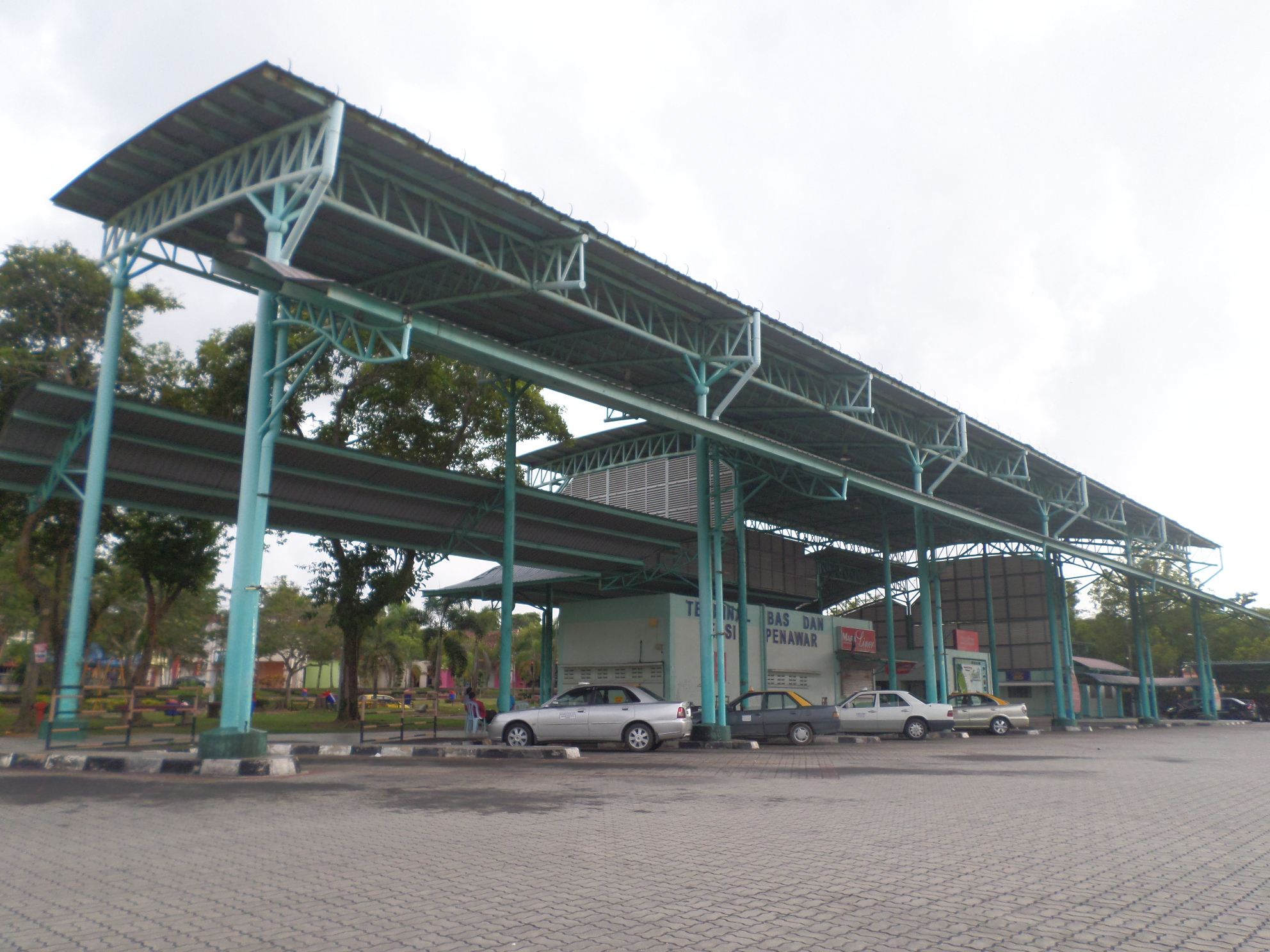
Penawar Bus and Taxi Terminal

Bandar Penawar Bus Terminal is served by Maraliner public buses that link the town of Bandar Penawar to Kota Tinggi, Pasir Gudang and Sungai Rengit.
