= Desaru =

Beach resort in Johor, Malaysia

Coordinates: 1°32′29.6″N 104°16′06.6″E

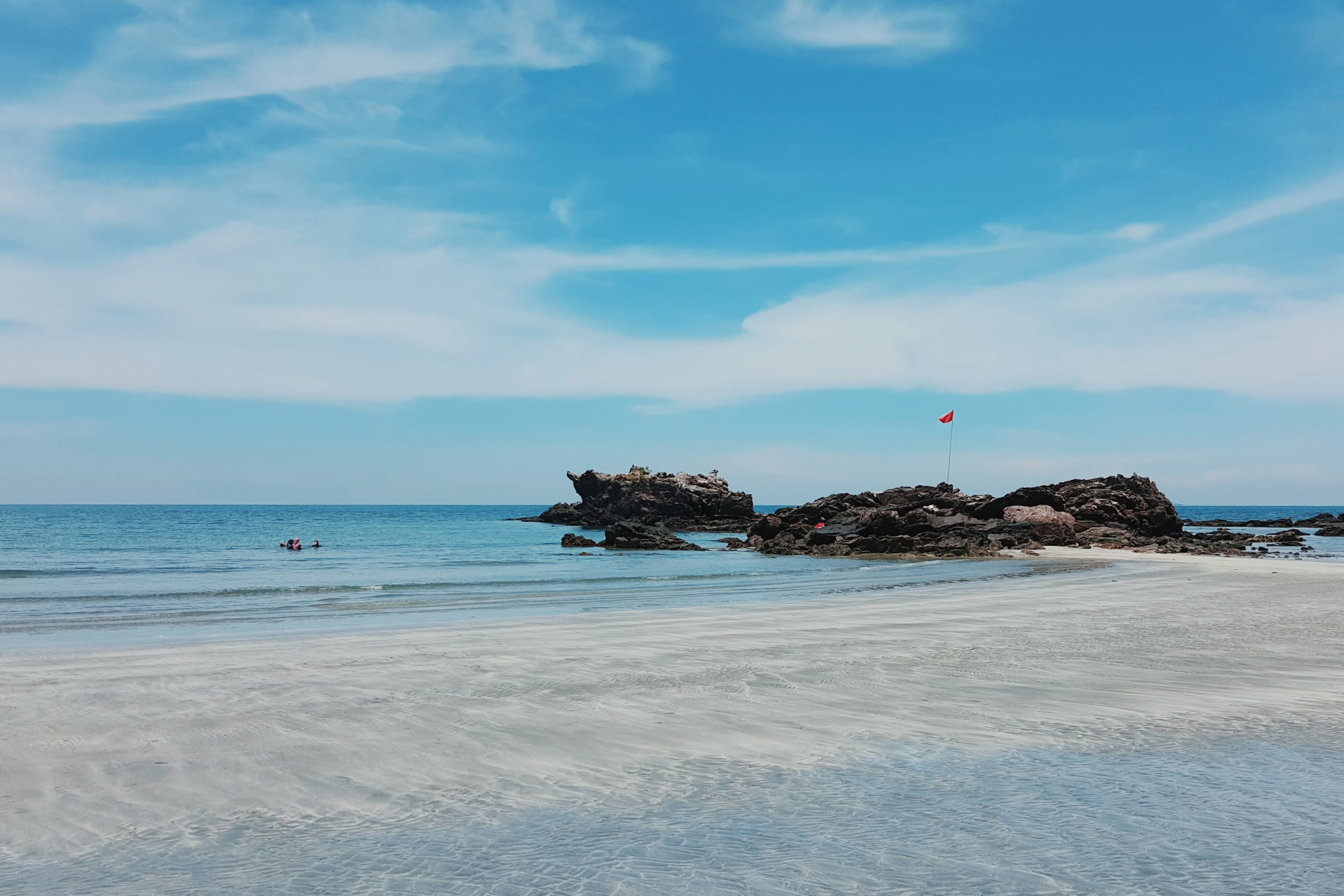
Desaru

Desaru is a beach resort in Kota Tinggi District, Johor, Malaysia. Located 60km away from Malaysia's second largest city, Johor Bahru, it is famous for its pristine beach, water park and premium integrated resort, facing the South China Sea, and recently became a popular camping spot with the influx of luxurious hotel resorts.

Desaru has been named one of the world's 100 greatest places in 2021 by Time magazine, the only destination in Malaysia to make into this list.

== Economy ==
Currently, the Johor state government is developing an integrated tourism area which spreads over an area of 1,578 hectares.

== Education ==
The area has various Malaysian boarding schools including Sekolah Menengah Sains Kota Tinggi, Sekolah Sukan Bandar Penawar and Sekolah Menengah Kebangsaan Agama Bandar Penawar.

== Theme Park ==
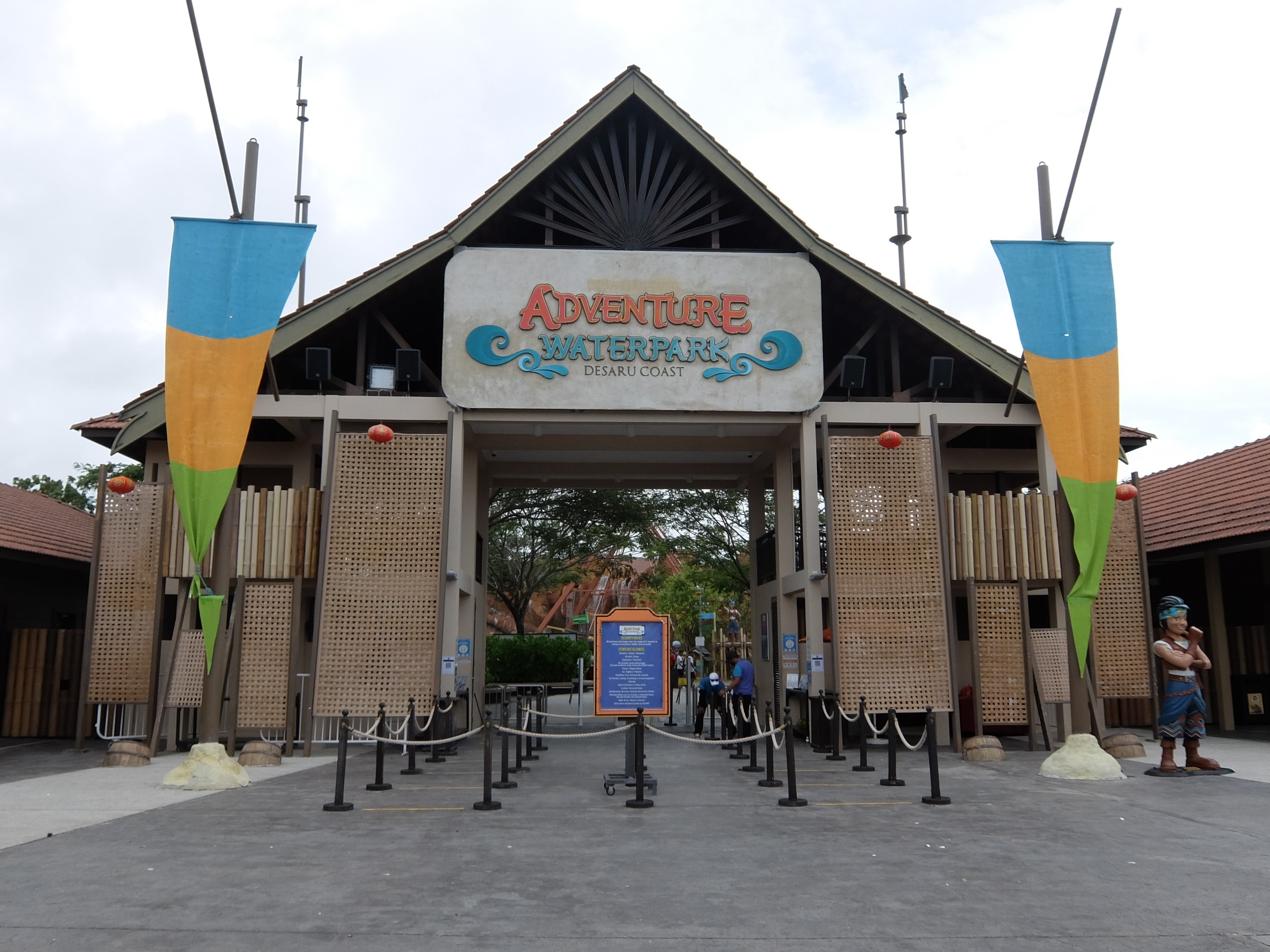
- Adventure Waterpark Desaru Coast
  Adventure Waterpark Desaru Coast

== Shopping ==
- SKS City Mall

== Hotels ==
- Hard Rock Hotel Desaru Coast
- The Westin Desaru Coast Resort
- Anantara Desaru Coast Resort & Villas
- Four Points by Sheraton
- Lotus Desaru Beach Resort & Spa
- Amerald Resort Hotel
- Mandarin Oriental Desaru Coast

=== Rebranded Hotels ===
- One&Only Desaru Coast - Until 1 May 2025
- The Sirēya Desaru Coast, replaced the One&Only brand until 1 February 2026.

== Food ==
- Desaru Coast Seafood Corner

== Transportation ==
Car and motorcycle is the fastest way to go to Desaru. The Senai–Desaru Expressway connects Desaru to Senai within 45 minutes. From Kluang to Desaru about 2-3 hours drive. From Johor Bahru area, it takes around 30-40 minutes.

As of July 2022, a new ferry terminal has been in operation at Desaru. Operating on five days of each week, it hosts ferry services from Tanah Merah Ferry Terminal near Tanah Merah, Singapore. Inclement weather may divert ferry services to Tanjung Pengelih instead.

== Resident areas ==
- Bandar Penawar
- Taman Sri Penawar
- Taman Desaru Utama
- Taman Mutiara Desaru
- Escadia
- Harmonia 1
- Harmonia 2
