= Sungai Rengit =

Town in Johor, Malaysia

Sungai Rengit (Jawi: سوڠاي رڠيت; Chinese: 四湾岛) is the town centre of Pengerang, Kota Tinggi District, Johor, Malaysia.

Sungai Rengit is essentially a collection of fishing villages and is very popular with seafood lovers. The town usually comes alive during its weekend flea markets. There are also regular Chinese opera performances during temple's celebration which liven up the atmosphere for the local population. There are several Chinese temples in the town like Bao An Gong Temple, Fong San Kong Temple and Datuk Gong Temple.

There is a World War 2 -era fortress built into a hill overlooking the coast. It is built by the British and housed a complex tunnel system, including generators, a hospital and living quarters for the soldiers based there.

== Transportation ==
It is connected to Singapore by boat from the ferry terminal at Changi Village.
