= Tanjung Balau =

Town in Kota Tinggi, Johor, Malaysia

Coordinates: 1°36′44″N 104°15′31″E

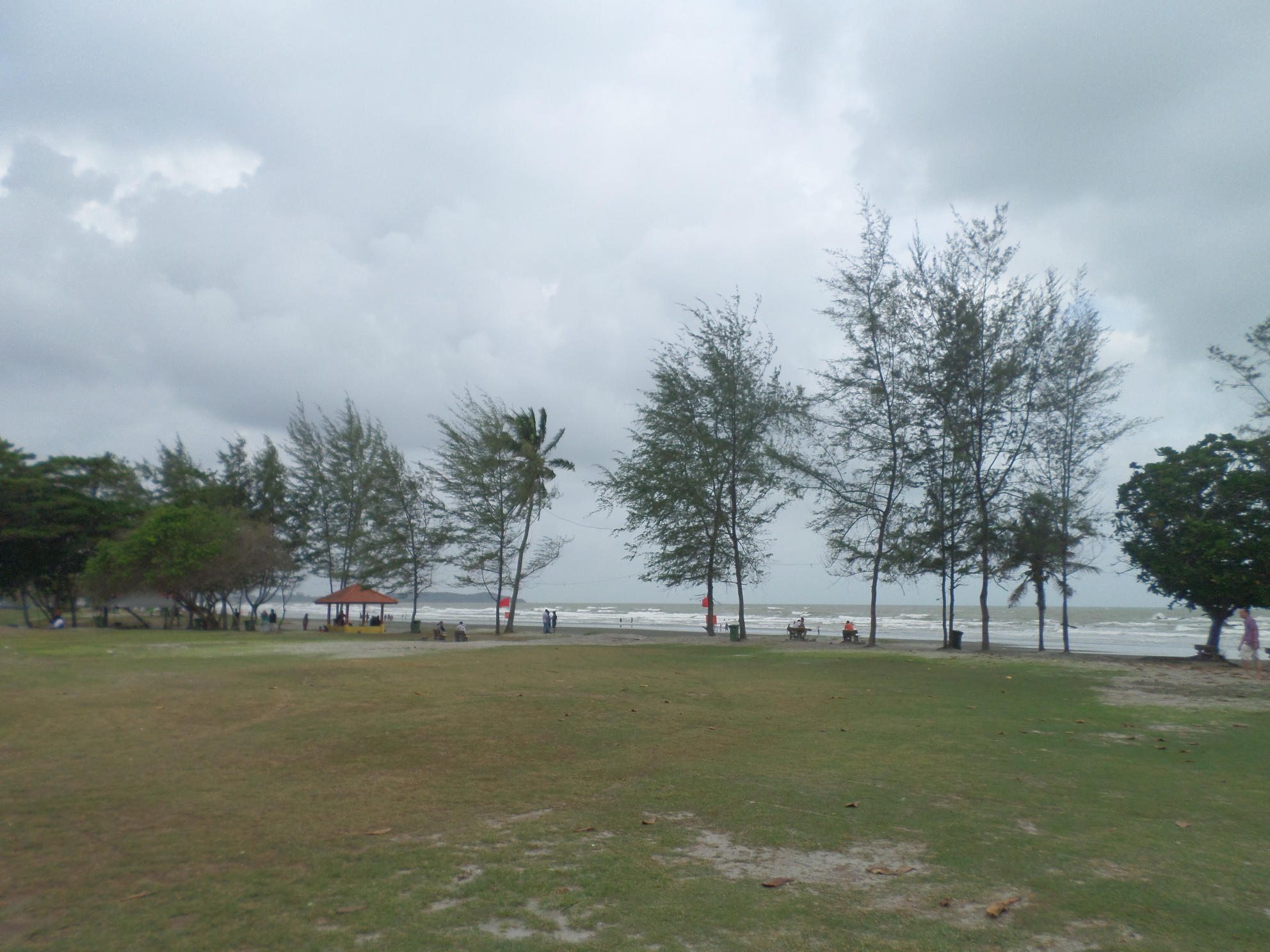
Tanjung Balau

Tanjung Balau is a beach town in Kota Tinggi District, Johor, Malaysia.

In April 2019, Johor Marine Department detected an oil spill off the coast of Tanjung Balau, covering 4 nautical miles from an estimated 300 tonnes of spilled marine fuel oil.

== Tourist attractions ==
- Tanjung Balau Beach
- Tanjung Balau Fishermen Museum
