= Kota Tinggi District =

District in Johor, Malaysia

- District of Johor
- Daerah Kota Tinggi
- Flag
- Interactive map of Kota Tinggi District
- Location of Kota Tinggi District in Malaysia
- Coordinates: 1°44′N 103°54′E
- Country: Malaysia
- State: Johor
- Seat: Kota Tinggi
- Local area government(s): Kota Tinggi District Council; Pengerang Municipal Council

Government
  - District officer: Hazlina binti Jalil

Area
  - Total: 2,737.63 km^{2} (1,057.00 sq mi)

Population (2020)
  - Total: 222,382
  - Density: 81.2316/km^{2} (210.389/sq mi)
- Time zone: UTC+8 (MST)
- Postcode: 81xxx
- Calling code: +6-07
- Vehicle registration plates: J

Kota Tinggi District is a district in the Malaysian state of Johor. It is the largest district in the state with an area of 3,488.7 square kilometres (1,347.0 sq mi). The population was 222,382 in 2020. The principal town is Kota Tinggi.

== Geography ==
The district has an area of 3,482 km^{2}. It is the largest district in Johor which covers 18.34% of the state area.

Main rivers that pass through the district are Johor River, Lebam River, Santi River, Sedili Besar River and Sedili Kecil River.

== Administrative divisions ==
Map of mukims of Kota Tinggi District

The district land is subdivided into 10 administrative mukims:

Type	UPI Code	Name	Population (2020 Census)	Area (km2)	Density (km2 per person)
Mukim	010401	Ulu Sungai Johor	37,568	915.0	41.06
Mukim	010402	Ulu Sungei Sedili Besar	6,566	501.6	13.09
Mukim	010403	Johor Lama	9,636	178.9	53.88
Mukim	010404	Kambau	2,291	198.0	11.57
Mukim	010405	Kota Tinggi	69,284	382.4	181.2
Mukim	010406	Pantai Timur	21,567	233.4	92.42
Mukim	010407	Pengerang	15,494	182.9	84.70
Mukim	010408	Sedili Besar	11,047	205.1	53.87
Mukim	010409	Sedili Kechil	14,742	322.0	45.78
Mukim	010410	Tanjung Surat	30,187	319.3	94.53
Town (Bandar)	010440	Kota Tinggi	4,000	2.140	1,869

== Demographics ==
Historical population
Year	Pop.	±%
1992	174,425	—
2000	192,336	+10.3%
2010	187,824	−2.3%
2020	222,382	+18.4%

According to the 2020 census, the population was 222,382 with 5.3% males and 46.7% females. In terms of citizenship, 93.8% were citizens and 6.2% were non-citizens. In terms of race among the citizens, 88% were bumiputeras (out of which 98.3% were Malays), 8.9% were Chinese, 2.7% were Indians, and 0.4% were other than the aforementioned races.

Ethnic composition of Kota Tinggi District (2020)
Ethnicities / Nationality	Percentage
Malays	81.11%
Other Bumiputeras	1.44%
Chinese	8.38%
Indians	2.49%
Others	0.37%
Non-Malaysians	6.21%

Ethnicity	2020	
Ethnicity	Pop.	%
Malays	180377	81.11%
Other Bumiputeras	3199	1.44%
Chinese	18630	8.38%
Indians	5541	2.49%
Others	828	0.37%
Malaysian total	208575	93.79%
Non-Malaysian	13807	6.21%
Total	222382	100.00%

== Local governments ==
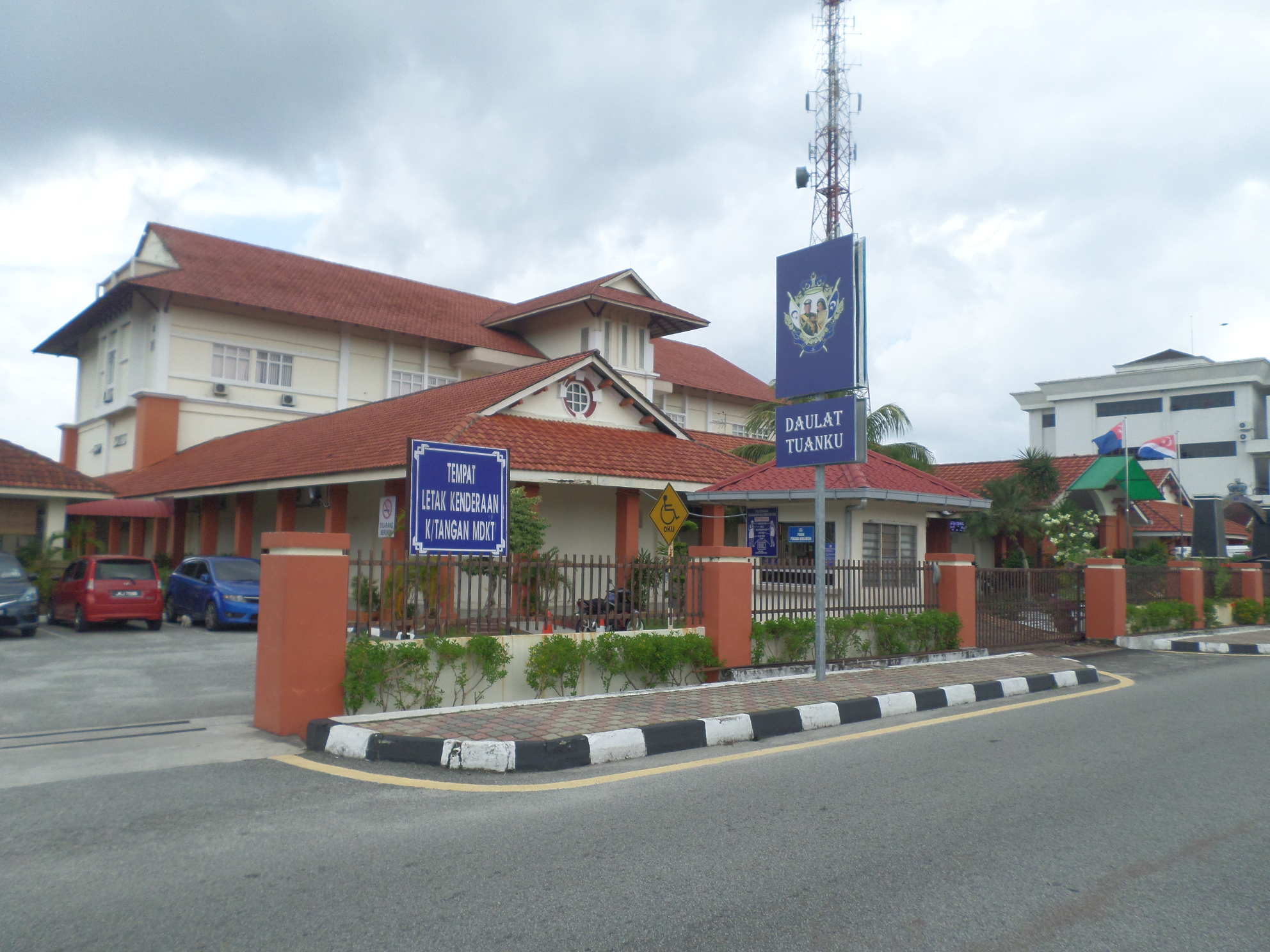
Kota Tinggi District Council

The district is governed by two local authorities (Pihak Berkuasa Tempatan), namely Kota Tinggi District Council (Majlis Daerah Kota Tinggi) and Pengerang Municipal Council (Majlis Perbandaran Pengerang). Kota Tinggi District Council mainly governs the northern part of the district and encompasses the mukims of Kambau, Kota Tinggi, Sedili Besar, Ulu Sungai Johor and Ulu Sungai Sedili Besar. Meanwhile, Pengerang Municipal Council governs the southern part and encompasses the mukims of Johor Lama, Pantai Timur, Pengerang, Sedili Kecil and Tanjung Surat.

== Federal Parliament and State Assembly Seats ==
List of Kota Tinggi district representatives in the federal legislature Dewan Rakyat:

Parliament	Seat Name	Member of Parliament	Party
P155	Tenggara	Manndzri Nasib	Barisan Nasional (UMNO)
P156	Kota Tinggi	Mohamed Khaled Nordin	Barisan Nasional (UMNO)
P157	Pengerang	Azalina Othman Said	Barisan Nasional (UMNO)
P158	Tebrau	Jimmy Puah Wee Tse	Pakatan Harapan (PKR)

List of Kota Tinggi district representatives in the State Legislative Assembly (Dewan Undangan Negeri):

Parliament	State	Seat Name	State Assemblyman	Party
P155	N34	Panti	Hahasrin Hashim	Barisan Nasional (UMNO)
P155	N35	Pasir Raja	Rashidah Ismail	Barisan Nasional (UMNO)
P156	N36	Sedili	Muszaidi Makmor	Barisan Nasional (UMNO)
P156	N37	Johor Lama	Norlizah Noh	Barisan Nasional (UMNO)
P157	N38	Penawar	Fauziah Misri	Barisan Nasional (UMNO)
P157	N39	Tanjung Surat	Aznan Tamin	Barisan Nasional (UMNO)
P158	N40	Tiram	Azizul Bachok	Barisan Nasional (UMNO)

== Towns ==
The primary towns in the district include:

- Bandar Penawar
- Bandar Tenggara
- Desaru
- Johor Lama
- Kota Tinggi
- Kuala Sedili
- Pengerang
- Sungai Rengit
- Tanjung Surat
- Teluk Sengat

== Economy ==
The main economy activities in the district are ecotourism, agriculture, biotechnology, petrochemical and oil and gas. 60% of the district land is used for agriculture purpose. In Desaru, currently the Johor state government is developing an integrated tourism area which spreads over an area of 1,578 hectares.

== Tourist attractions ==
- Kota Tinggi Museum
- Sultan Iskandar Reservoir
- Sultan Mahmud Mangkat Di Julang Mausoleum
- Tanjung Balau Fishermen Museum
- Desaru
- Kota Tinggi Waterfalls

== Transportation ==
The district is served by BAS. MY Johor Bahru (J10) public buses linking Kota Tinggi Town to Larkin Sentral Terminal in Johor Bahru City and also other destinations within the district, such as Bandar Penawar.

== See also ==
- Kota Tinggi
