= List of state roads in Malaysia =

,

This is the list of Malaysian State Routes by state.

== Johor ==
Route shield	Name	Name of roads	District	Interstate road: states crossed
J1	Johor State Route J1	Iskandar Coastal Highway	Johor Bahru	
J3	Johor State Route J3	Kempas Highway	Johor Bahru	
J3	Johor State Route J3	Jalan Datin Halimah	Johor Bahru	
J4	Johor State Route J4	Jalan Gelang Patah	Johor Bahru	
J5	Johor State Route J5	Johor Bahru East Coast Parkway	Johor Bahru	
J6	Johor State Route J6	Jalan Layang Layang	Kulai	
J7	Johor State Route J7	Jalan Gelang Patah–Ulu Choh	Johor Bahru	
J8	Johor State Route J8	Jalan Seelong	Kulai, Johor Bahru	
J9	Johor State Route J9	Jalan Parit Hamid–Parit Botak	Batu Pahat	
J10	Johor State Route J10	Jalan Masai Lama	Johor Bahru	
J11	Johor State Route J11	Jalan Sungai Redan	Johor Bahru, Kota Tinggi	
J13	Johor State Route J13	Jalan Tongkang Pechah	Batu Pahat	
J14	Johor State Route J14	Jalan Sembrong Dalam	Kluang	
J15	Johor State Route J15	Jalan Kampung Tengah	Kluang	
J16	Johor State Route J16	Jalan Paloh	Batu Pahat, Kluang	
J17	Johor State Route J17	Jalan Minyak Beku	Batu Pahat	
J18	Johor State Route J18	Jalan Parit Maimon	Batu Pahat	
J19	Johor State Route J19	Jalan Simpang Lima–Parit Sulong	Batu Pahat	
J20	Johor State Route J20	Jalan Ismail	Muar	
J21	Johor State Route J21	Jalan Sialang	Tangkak	Malacca
J22	Johor State Route J22	Jalan Sungai Abong	Muar	
J23	Johor State Route J23	Jalan Pagoh–Parit Sulong	Muar, Batu Pahat	
J24	Johor State Route J24	Jalan Salleh	Muar	
J25	Johor State Route J25	Jalan Kluang–Renggam	Kluang	
J26	Johor State Route J26	Jalan Simpang Renggam–Layang Layang	Kluang	
J27	Johor State Route J27	Jalan Parit Jamil	Muar	
J28	Johor State Route J28	Jalan Kampung Jawa–Panchor	Muar	
J29	Johor State Route J29	Jalan Parit Buaya	Muar	
J30	Johor State Route J30	Jalan Kampung Tengah	Muar	
J31	Johor State Route J31	Jalan Temenggong Ahmad/Jalan Parit Jawa	Muar	
J32	Johor State Route J32	Jalan Muar–Labis	Muar, Segamat	
J33	Johor State Route J33	Jalan Bukit Gambir	Tangkak	
J34	Johor State Route J34	Jalan Bukit Serampang	Tangkak, Muar	
J35	Johor State Route J35	Jalan Seri Medan	Batu Pahat	
J36	Johor State Route J36	Jalan Parit Haji Ariff	Batu Pahat	
J37	Johor State Route J37	Jalan Melayu Raya	Segamat	
J38	Johor State Route J38	Jalan Meriyani	Segamat	
J39	Johor State Route J39	Jalan Mohammad	Segamat	
J40	Johor State Route J40	Jalan Temenggong	Segamat	
J41	Johor State Route J41	Jalan Pogoh	Muar, Segamat	
J42	Johor State Route J42	Jalan Sawah Padi	Segamat	
J43	Johor State Route J43	Jalan Pulapol	Segamat	
J44	Johor State Route J44	Jalan Kwongsai	Segamat	
J45	Johor State Route J45	Jalan Loji Air	Segamat	
J46	Johor State Route J46	Jalan Ulu Pulai	Pontian, Johor Bahru	
J47	Johor State Route J47	Jalan Permas–Chokoh	Pontian	
J48	Johor State Route J48	Jalan Tanjung Piai	Pontian	
J49	Johor State Route J49	Jalan Parit Mesjid	Pontian	
J50	Johor State Route J50	Jalan Sekolah Arab	Pontian	
J51	Johor State Route J51	Jalan Tampok Laut	Pontian	
J52	Johor State Route J52	Jalan Tanjung Pengelih	Kota Tinggi	
J53	Johor State Route J53	Jalan Tai Hong	Kota Tinggi	
J54	Johor State Route J54	Jalan Kampung Sahari	Kluang	
J55	Johor State Route J55	Jalan Parit Haji Hashim	Kluang	
J56	Johor State Route J56	Jalan Parit Cina	Tangkak	
J59	Johor State Route J59	Jalan Joned	Muar	
J60; M112	Johor State Route J60	Jalan Kesang Tasik	Tangkak	Malacca
J61	Johor State Route J61	Jalan Kg. Liang Batu Lenga	Muar	
J62	Johor State Route J62	Jalan Bakar Batu	Muar	
J63	Johor State Route J63	Jalan Kurnia Sakti	Tangkak	
J64	Johor State Route J64	Jalan Bakariah	Muar	
J65	Johor State Route J65	Jalan Jorak–Bukit Pasir	Muar	
J67	Johor State Route J67	Jalan Penchu	Tangkak	
J69	Johor State Route J69	Jalan Sungai Bebuta	Mersing	
J70	Johor State Route J70	Jalan Semaloi	Mersing	
J71	Johor State Route J71	Jalan Kg Hubong	Mersing	
J72	Johor State Route J72	Jalan Haji Ismail	Mersing	
J73	Johor State Route J73	Jalan Semanyir	Mersing	
J74	Johor State Route J74	Jalan Teluk Lipat	Mersing	
J75	Johor State Route J75	Jalan Belukar Juling	Mersing	
J76	Johor State Route J76	Jalan Teluk Lipat–Semanyir	Mersing	
J77	Johor State Route J77	Jalan Bukit Tekedai	Mersing	
J78	Johor State Route J78	Jalan Tanjung Resang–Penyabong	Mersing	
J79	Johor State Route J79	Jalan Air Papan	Mersing	
J80	Johor State Route J80	Jalan Makam	Mersing	
J81	Johor State Route J81	Jalan Tenglu Laut	Mersing	
J82	Johor State Route J82	Jalan Tanjung Genting	Mersing	
J83	Johor State Route J83	Jalan Haji Abu Hassan	Mersing	
J84	Johor State Route J84	Jalan Haji Esa	Mersing	
J85	Johor State Route J85	Jalan Air Merah	Mersing	
J86	Johor State Route J86	Jalan Felda Neram 2	Mersing	
J87	Johor State Route J87	Jalan Gajah Mati	Mersing	
J89	Johor State Route J89	Jalan Tanjung Sedili	Kota Tinggi	
J90	Johor State Route J90	Jalan Sungai Telor	Kota Tinggi	
J93	Johor State Route J93	Jalan SMK Layang-Layang	Kluang	
J94	Johor State Route J94	Jalan Pintasan Kahang Barat	Kluang	
J95	Johor State Route J95	Jalan Lingkaran Kahang Barat	Kluang	
J96	Johor State Route J96	Jalan Kampung Sri Timur	Kluang	
J97	Johor State Route J97	Jalan Kahang Timur–Ulu Dengar	Kluang	
J98	Johor State Route J98	Jalan Mardi	Kluang	
J99	Johor State Route J99	Jalan GSA Chamek	Kluang	
J101	Johor State Route J101	Jalan Kangkar Tebrau	Johor Bahru	
J102	Johor State Route J102	Jalan Ban Foo	Johor Bahru	
J103	Johor State Route J103	Jalan Sedenak	Kulai	
J104	Johor State Route J104	Jalan Sengkang	Kulai	
J105	Johor State Route J105	Jalan Seelong–Kempas (Note: Previously J192)	Kulai, Johor Bahru	
J105	Johor State Route J105	Jalan Kempas Lama (Note: Previously J193)	Johor Bahru	
J106	Johor State Route J106	Jalan Sungai Danga	Johor Bahru	
J107	Johor State Route J107	Jalan Parit Panjang	Kulai, Pontian	
J108	Johor State Route J108	Jalan Parit Wagiman	Pontian	
J109	Johor State Route J109	Jalan Parit Haji Adnan	Pontian	
J110	Johor State Route J110	Jalan Peradin	Pontian	
J111	Johor State Route J111	Jalan Serkat	Pontian	
J112	Johor State Route J112	Jalan Parit Semerah	Pontian	
J113	Johor State Route J113	Jalan Sawah	Pontian	
J114	Johor State Route J114	Jalan Tenggayun	Pontian	
J115	Johor State Route J115	Jalan Parit Sikom	Pontian	
J116	Johor State Route J116	Jalan Parit Selangor	Pontian	
J117	Johor State Route J117	Jalan Tampok Darat–Parit Betak	Pontian	
J118	Johor State Route J118	Jalan Parit Sikom–Parit Panjang	Pontian	
J119	Johor State Route J119	Jalan Madirino	Pontian	
J120	Johor State Route J120	Jalan Jaya Diri/Seri Merlong	Batu Pahat	
J121	Johor State Route J121	Jalan Parit Raja Darat	Batu Pahat	
J122	Johor State Route J122	Jalan Parit Kemang	Batu Pahat	
J123; M123	Johor State Route J123	Jalan Bekoh	Tangkak	Malacca
J124	Johor State Route J124	Jalan Sungai Suloh	Batu Pahat	
J125	Johor State Route J125	Jalan Sengkuang	Batu Pahat	
J126	Johor State Route J126	Jalan Parit Sulong–Tongkang Pechah	Batu Pahat	
J127	Johor State Route J127	Jalan Bukit Batu	Batu Pahat	
J128	Johor State Route J128	Jalan Kangka Senangar	Batu Pahat	
J129	Johor State Route J129	Jalan Batu Puteh	Batu Pahat	
J130	Johor State Route J130	Jalan Parit Yusuf Darat	Muar	
J131	Johor State Route J131	Jalan Bukit Mor	Muar	
J132	Johor State Route J132	Jalan Parit Bakar	Muar	
J133	Johor State Route J133	Jalan Sri Tanjung	Muar	
J134	Johor State Route J134	Jalan Kesang Laut	Tangkak	
J135	Johor State Route J135	Jalan Sungai Terap–Simpang Jeram	Muar	
J136	Johor State Route J136	Jalan Teluk Rimba	Tangkak	Malacca
J137	Johor State Route J137	Jalan Panchor	Tangkak, Muar	
J138	Johor State Route J138	Jalan Sagil–Melayu Raya	Tangkak	
J139	Johor State Route J139	Jalan Kampung Raja	Muar	
J140	Johor State Route J140	Jalan Dato' Haji Kosai	Muar	
J141	Johor State Route J141	Jalan Jorak	Muar	
J142	Johor State Route J142	Jalan Sungai Gersik	Muar	
J143	Johor State Route J143	Jalan Sengkang–Kampung Teratai	Tangkak	
J145	Johor State Route J145	Jalan Renchong / Gombang	Muar	
J146	Johor State Route J146	Jalan Parit Zin	Muar	
J148	Johor State Route J148	Jalan Batu Nampak	Muar	
J150	Johor State Route J150	Jalan Bekok	Segamat, Kluang	
J151	Johor State Route J151	Jalan Ayer Panas	Segamat	
J152	Johor State Route J152	Segamat Inner Ring Road	Segamat	
J216	Johor State Route J216	Segamat Inner Ring Road	Segamat	
J217	Johor State Route J217	Segamat Inner Ring Road	Segamat	
J153	Johor State Route J153	Jalan Tasek Alai	Segamat	
J154	Johor State Route J154	Jalan Kampung Tengah	Segamat	
J155	Johor State Route J155	Jalan Kuala Paya–Balai Badang	Segamat	
J156	Johor State Route J156	Jalan Jabi–Bukit Tempurung	Segamat	
J157	Johor State Route J157	Jalan Sepang Loi/Jalan Tumang	Segamat	
J158	Johor State Route J158	Jalan Gelang Chinchin	Segamat	
J159	Johor State Route J159	Jalan Parit Haji Othman	Pontian	
J160	Johor State Route J160	Jalan Sawah Baru	Segamat	
J161	Johor State Route J161	Jalan Gudang Garam	Segamat	
J162	Johor State Route J162	Jalan Sungai Siput	Segamat	
J163	Johor State Route J163	Jalan Bukit Tunggal	Segamat	
J164	Johor State Route J164	Jalan Tebing Tinggi	Segamat	
J165	Johor State Route J165	Kulai–NSE Highway/Jalan Sawah (Note: Formerly Federal Route 399)	Kulai, Pontian	
J170	Johor State Route J170	Jalan Parit Makasar	Pontian	
J171	Johor State Route J171	Jalan Lombong	Kota Tinggi	
J172	Johor State Route J172	Jalan Mawai Lama	Kota Tinggi	
J174	Johor State Route J174	Jalan Johor Lama	Kota Tinggi	
J175	Johor State Route J175	Jalan Kampung Makam/Jalan Lukut	Kota Tinggi	
J178	Johor State Route J178	Jalan Kampung Kelantan / Panti	Kota Tinggi	
J179	Johor State Route J179	Jalan Perani	Kota Tinggi	
J180	Johor State Route J180	Jalan Sri Pantai	Mersing	
J181	Johor State Route J181	Jalan Sekakap	Mersing	
J182	Johor State Route J182	Jalan Penyabong	Mersing	
J183	Johor State Route J183	Jalan Tanjung Resang	Mersing	
J184	Johor State Route J184	Jalan Pengkalan Batu	Mersing	
J186	Johor State Route J186	Jalan Mohd Aris	Mersing	
J187	Johor State Route J187	Jalan Solok	Tangkak	
J188	Johor State Route J188	Jalan Kampung Teratai	Tangkak	
J189	Johor State Route J189	Jalan Pantai Layang	Tangkak	
J190	Johor State Route J190	Jalan Permatang Pasir–Naib Kadir	Muar	
J191	Johor State Route J191	Jalan Kluang–Nyior–Paloh	Kluang	
J192	Johor State Route J192	Jalan Naib Long	Tangkak	
J194	Johor State Route J194	Jalan Parit Kassan–Sagil	Tangkak	
J195	Johor State Route J195	Jalan Parit Latif	Muar	
J196	Johor State Route J196	Jalan Parit Haji Ariff	Batu Pahat	
J197	Johor State Route J197	Jalan Kampung Parit Warijo	Batu Pahat	
J200	Johor State Route J200	Jalan Bindu	Batu Pahat	
J201	Johor State Route J201	Jalan Panchor	Batu Pahat	
J202	Johor State Route J202	Jalan Parit Besar	Batu Pahat	
J203	Johor State Route J203	Jalan Sungai Nibong	Batu Pahat	
J204	Johor State Route J204	Jalan Tan Swee Hoe	Batu Pahat	
J206	Johor State Route J206	Jalan Olak Batu	Batu Pahat	
J207	Johor State Route J207	Jalan Bukit Kelicap	Batu Pahat	
J208	Johor State Route J208	Jalan Rejo Sari	Batu Pahat	
J209	Johor State Route J209	Jalan Parit Karjo	Batu Pahat	
J216	Johor State Route J216	Jalan Teluk Arong	Mersing	
J219	Johor State Route J219	Jalan Kampung Sri Maju Jaya	Kluang	
J220	Johor State Route J220	Jalan Ulu Belitong	Kluang	
J222	Johor State Route J221	Jalan Pasir Gogok	Kota Tinggi	
J222	Johor State Route J222	Jalan Teluk Sengat	Kota Tinggi	
J223	Johor State Route J223	Jalan Ladang Siang	Kota Tinggi	
J224	Johor State Route J224	Jalan Semangar Dalam	Kota Tinggi	
J225	Johor State Route J225	Jalan Terminal Feri	Kota Tinggi	
J226	Johor State Route J226	Jalan Desaru–Tanjung Balau	Kota Tinggi	
J227	Johor State Route J227		Pontian	
J228	Johor State Route J228	Jalan Tanah Abang	Mersing	
J229	Johor State Route J229	Jalan Parit Basilam–Pontian	Pontian	
J230	Johor State Route J230	Jalan Kampung Raja–FELDA Maokil	Muar	
J236	Johor State Route J236	Jalan Taman Negara Johor Gunung Ledang	Tangkak	
J239	Johor State Route J239	Kota Iskandar Highway	Johor Bahru	
J246	Johor State Route J245	Jalan Tun Sri Lanang	Kota Tinggi	
J246	Johor State Route J246	Jalan Lama Genuang	Segamat	
J260	Johor State Route J260	Jalan Balai Polis Buloh Kasap	Segamat	
J262	Johor State Route J262	Jalan Lama Spang Loi	Segamat	
J271	Johor State Route J271	Jalan Pintas FELDA Taib Andak–Inas	Kulai	
J273	Johor State Route J273	Jalan Parit Jambi	Batu Pahat	
J277; M125	Johor State Route J277	Jalan Asahan–Jementah	Segamat, Tangkak	Negeri Sembilan; Malacca
J279	Johor State Route J279	Jalan Putting	Segamat	

=== Former state roads gazetted as federal roads ===
Route shield		Name	Name of roads	District	Interstate road: states crossed
Current	Former	Name	Name of roads	District	Interstate road: states crossed
FT 3374	J2	Malaysia Federal Route 3374	Jalan Tampoi	Johor Bahru	
FT 1375	J8	Malaysia Federal Route 1375	Jalan Ulu Tiram	Kulai, Johor Bahru	
FT 1384	J152	Malaysia Federal Route 1384	Jalan Medoi	Segamat	
FT 212	J172	Malaysia Federal Route 212	Jalan Tanjung Sedili	Kota Tinggi	
FT 213	J173	Malaysia Federal Route 213	Jalan Sedili Kechil	Kota Tinggi	
FT 172	J191	Malaysia Federal Route 172	Kluang Inner Ring Road	Kluang	

== Kedah ==
Route shield	Name	Name of roads	District	Interstate road: states crossed
K1	Kedah State Route K1	Jalan Pantai Barat Kedah	Kota Setar, Yan, Kuala Muda	
K2	Kedah State Route K2	Jalan Gunung Keriang	Kota Setar	
K4	Kedah State Route K4	Jalan Sungai Korok–Jitra	Kubang Pasu	
K5	Kedah State Route K5	Jalan Hutan Kampung	Kota Setar, Kubang Pasu	
K6	Kedah State Route K6	Jalan Arau–Changlun/Jalan Titi Kerbau	Kubang Pasu	Perlis
K8	Kedah State Route K8	Jalan Pokok Sena–Nami	Pokok Sena, Sik	
K10	Kedah State Route K10	Jalan Baling–Sik	Baling, Sik	
K11	Kedah State Route K11	Jalan Pokok Sena–Padang Terap	Pokok Sena, Padang Terap	
K132	Kedah State Route K132	Jalan Tandop	Kota Setar	
K161	Kedah State Route K161	Jalan Tanjung Dawai	Kuala Muda	
K165	Kedah State Route K165	Jalan Rekreasi Tupah	Kuala Muda	
K399	Kedah State Route K399	Jalan Alor Semadom	Kota Setar	
K631	Kedah State Route K631	Jalan Lembah Bujang	Kuala Muda	
K906	Kedah State Route K906	Jalan Ayer Puteh	Bandar Baharu	Penang

=== Former state roads gazetted as federal roads ===
Route shield		Name	Name of roads	District	Interstate road: states crossed
Current	Former	Name	Name of roads	District	Interstate road: states crossed
FT 136	A16; K16	Malaysia Federal Route 136	Jalan Kuala Ketil–Parit Buntar	Baling, Kulim, Bandar Baharu	Perak
FT 171	K7; A7	Malaysia Federal Route 171	Jalan Serdang–Selama	Bandar Baharu	Perak
FT 252	K159	Malaysia Federal Route 252	Jalan Gunung Jerai	Yan	
FT 255	K139	Malaysia Federal Route 255	Sultanah Bahiyah Highway	Kota Setar	

== Kelantan ==
Route shield	Name	Name of roads	District	Interstate road: states crossed
D2	Kelantan State Route D2	Jalan Kebun Sultan	Kota Bharu	
D29	Kelantan State Route D29	Jalan Dabong–Gua Musang	Kuala Krai, Gua Musang	

=== Former state roads gazetted as federal roads ===
Route shield		Name	Name of roads	District	Interstate road: states crossed
Current	Former	Name	Name of roads	District	Interstate road: states crossed
FT 189	D7; D11; T7	Malaysia Federal Route 189	Jalan Pesisiran Pantai Kelantan	Bachok, Pasir Puteh	Terengganu
FT 259	D28	Malaysia Federal Route 259	Jalan Sultan Ismail Petra	Tanah Merah	

== Malacca ==
Route shield	Name	Name of roads	District	Interstate road: states crossed
M2	Malacca State Route M2	Jalan Durian Tunggal–Tangkak	Melaka Tengah, Alor Gajah, Jasin	
M3	Malacca State Route M3	Jalan Datuk Wira Poh Ah Tiam	Melaka Tengah	
M5	Malacca State Route M5	Jalan Pokok Mangga	Melaka Tengah	
M6	Malacca State Route M6	Jalan Tanjung Minyak	Melaka Tengah	
M7	Malacca State Route M7	Jalan Pulau Gadong	Melaka Tengah	
M8	Malacca State Route M8	Jalan Alor Gajah–Nyalas	Alor Gajah, Jasin	
M9	Malacca State Route M9	Jalan Bukit Rambai	Melaka Tengah	
M10	Malacca State Route M10	Jalan Simpang Ampat	Alor Gajah	
M11	Malacca State Route M11	Jalan Batang Tiga		
M12	Malacca State Route M12	Jalan Gapam	Melaka Tengah, Jasin	
M13	Malacca State Route M13	Jalan Dangi–Kesang Pajak	Jasin	Negeri Sembilan
M14	Malacca State Route M14	Jalan Merlimau Darat	Jasin	
M15; N15	Malacca State Route M15	Jalan Nyalas	Jasin	Negeri Sembilan
M25	Malacca State Route M25	Jalan Merlimau–Jasin	Jasin	
M25	Malacca State Route M25	Jasin–NSE Highway	Jasin	
M100	Malacca State Route M100	Jalan Padang Temu	Melaka Tengah	
M108	Malacca State Route M108	Jalan Serkam Pantai	Jasin	
M109	Malacca State Route M109	Jalan Tiang Dua	Jasin	
M112; J60	Malacca State Route M112	Jalan Kesang Tasik	Jasin	Johor
M117	Malacca State Route M117	Jalan Permatang Tulang	Jasin	
M123; J123	Malacca State Route M123	Jalan Bekoh	Jasin	Johor
M125; J277	Malacca State Route M125	Jalan Asahan–Jementah	Jasin	Negeri Sembilan; Johor
M126	Malacca State Route M126	Jalan Sungai Putat	Melaka Tengah	
M143	Malacca State Route M143	Jalan Kuala Sungai Baru–Sungai Udang	Melaka Tengah, Alor Gajah	
M144	Malacca State Route M144	Jalan Bukit Katil	Melaka Tengah	
M157	Malacca State Route M157	Jalan Londang	Alor Gajah	

=== Former state roads gazetted as federal roads ===
Route shield		Name	Name of roads	District	Interstate road: states crossed
Current	Former	Name	Name of roads	District	Interstate road: states crossed
FT 33	M17	Malaysia Federal Route 33	SPA Highway	Alor Gajah, Melaka Tengah	
FT 138	M142; M143; N143	Malaysia Federal Route 138	Jalan Kuala Sungai Baru–Sungai Udang (Note: Kuala Linggi–Kuala Sungai Baru side)	Alor Gajah, Melaka Tengah	Negeri Sembilan
FT 140	M4	Malaysia Federal Route 140	Jalan Pantai Kundor	Alor Gajah, Melaka Tengah	
FT 141	M23	Malaysia Federal Route 141	Jalan Pantai Dusun–Tanjung Kling	Alor Gajah, Melaka Tengah	
FT 143	M31	Malaysia Federal Route 143	Ayer Keroh Highway	Alor Gajah, Melaka Tengah	
FT 144	M27	Malaysia Federal Route 144	Jalan Kandang–Jasin–Chabau	Melaka Tengah, Jasin	
FT 264	M12; M107	Malaysia Federal Route 264	Jalan Duyong–Ayer Keroh	Melaka Tengah	

== Negeri Sembilan ==
Route shield	Name	Name of roads	District	Interstate road: states crossed
N1	Negeri Sembilan State Route N1	Seremban Inner Ring Road	Seremban	
N3	Negeri Sembilan State Route N3	Jalan Ampang Tinggi	Kuala Pilah	
N4	Negeri Sembilan State Route N4	Jalan Bukit Pelanduk	Port Dickson	
N5	Negeri Sembilan State Route N5	Jalan Sungai Gadut	Seremban	
N6	Negeri Sembilan State Route N6	Jalan Siliau	Seremban, Port Dickson	
N7	Negeri Sembilan State Route N7	Jalan Rantau	Seremban, Port Dickson	
N8	Negeri Sembilan State Route N8	Jalan Sungai Menyala	Port Dickson	
N9	Negeri Sembilan State Route N9	Jalan Pedas–Linggi	Rembau, Port Dickson	
N10	Negeri Sembilan State Route N10	Jalan Paya Lebar	Rembau	
N11	Negeri Sembilan State Route N11	Jalan Penajis	Rembau	
N12	Negeri Sembilan State Route N12	Jalan Kota–Linggi	Rembau, Port Dickson	
N13; M13	Negeri Sembilan State Route N13	Jalan Dangi–Kesang Pajak	Kuala Pilah, Jempol, Tampin	Malacca
N14	Negeri Sembilan State Route N14	Jalan Rembau–Johol	Rembau, Kuala Pilah	
N15; M15	Negeri Sembilan State Route N15	Jalan Nyalas	Tampin	Malacca
N17	Negeri Sembilan State Route N17	Jalan Utama Bahau	Kuala Pilah, Jempol	
N18	Negeri Sembilan State Route N18	Jalan Air Kuning Selatan	Tampin	
N19	Negeri Sembilan State Route N19	Jalan Pertang–Batu Kikir	Jelebu, Kuala Pilah, Jempol	
N20	Negeri Sembilan State Route N20	Jalan Kepis–Rompin	Kuala Pilah, Jempol	
N21	Negeri Sembilan State Route N21	Jalan Daching Hilir	Jempol	
N22	Negeri Sembilan State Route N22	Jalan Kepis-Senaling	Kuala Pilah	
N23	Negeri Sembilan State Route N23	Jalan Kerangai	Jelebu	
N24	Negeri Sembilan State Route N24	Jalan Tanjung Ipoh–Senaling	Kuala Pilah	
N25	Negeri Sembilan State Route N25	Jalan Kampung Chennah	Jelebu	
N26	Negeri Sembilan State Route N26	Jalan Serting Ulu–Bandar Seri Jempol	Jempol	
N27	Negeri Sembilan State Route N27	Jalan Kampung Puruh	Jelebu	
N28	Negeri Sembilan State Route N28	Jalan Bulatan BBN - Kawasan Perindustrian Nilai	Seremban	
N29	Negeri Sembilan State Route N29	Jalan Terachi–Seri Menanti	Kuala Pilah	
N30	Negeri Sembilan State Route N30	Jalan Lenggeng	Seremban	Selangor
N31	Negeri Sembilan State Route N31	Jalan Mantin	Seremban	
N32; B32	Negeri Sembilan State Route N32	Jalan Semenyih–Kuala Klawang	Jelebu	Selangor
N33	Negeri Sembilan State Route N33	Jalan Kundur Tengah	Port Dickson	
N34	Negeri Sembilan State Route N34	Jalan Broga	Seremban	Selangor
N35	Negeri Sembilan State Route N35	Jalan Persiaran Senawang 3	Seremban	
N36	Negeri Sembilan State Route N36	Jalan Kampung Sungai Machang–Kampung Rawa	Seremban	
N37	Negeri Sembilan State Route N37	Jalan Kuala Pilah Lama	Seremban	
N38	Negeri Sembilan State Route N38	Jalan Sikamat	Seremban	
N40	Negeri Sembilan State Route N40	Jalan Persiaran Senawang 2	Seremban	
N100	Negeri Sembilan State Route N100	Jalan Sega–Kuala Sawah	Seremban	

=== Former state roads gazetted as federal roads ===
Route shield		Name	Name of roads	District	Interstate road: states crossed
Current	Former	Name	Name of roads	District	Interstate road: states crossed
FT 32	N20; B20	Malaysia Federal Route 32	Labohan Dagang–Nilai Route	Seremban	Selangor
FT 138	M142; M143; N143	Malaysia Federal Route 138	Jalan Kuala Sungai Baru–Sungai Udang (Note: Kuala Linggi–Kuala Sungai Baru side)	Port Dickson	Malacca
FT 245	N21	Malaysia Federal Route 245	Jalan Serting Tengah–Ayer Hitam	Jempol	
FT 246	N17B	Malaysia Federal Route 246	Jalan Bahau–Batu Kikir	Jempol	
FT 362	N38B	Malaysia Federal Route 362	Jalan Labu	Seremban	
FT 1265	N1	Malaysia Federal Route 1265	Jalan Mambau–Nilai	Seremban	
FT 1266	N68	Malaysia Federal Route 1266	Jalan FELDA LB Johnson	Seremban	Selangor
FT 3265	N36	Malaysia Federal Route 3265	Jalan Nilai–Pajam	Seremban	Selangor

== Pahang ==
Route shield	Name	Name of roads	District	Interstate road: states crossed
C7	Pahang State Route C7	Jalan Janda Baik	Bentong	
C8	Pahang State Route C8	Jalan Mengkarak–Paluh Hinai	Bera, Maran, Pekan	
C108	Pahang State Route C108	Jalan Mengkarak–Paluh Hinai	Bera, Maran, Pekan	
C130	Pahang State Route C130	Jalan Mengkarak–Paluh Hinai	Bera, Maran, Pekan	
C19	Pahang State Route C19	Jalan Belimbing	Maran, Pekan	
C100	Pahang State Route C100	Jalan Sungai Pak Leh	Pekan	
C101	Pahang State Route C101	Jalan Tanjung Selangor	Pekan	
C102	Pahang State Route C102	Jalan Kuala Pahang	Pekan	
C103	Pahang State Route C103	Jalan Pahang Tua	Pekan	
C106	Pahang State Route C106	Jalan Belimbing–Pahang Tua	Pekan	
C123	Pahang State Route C123	Jalan Kampung Seberang	Temerloh	
C141	Pahang State Route C141	Jalan Ulu Cheka	Jerantut	
C143	Pahang State Route C143	Jalan Pulau Tawar–Durian Hijau	Jerantut	
C162	Pahang State Route C162	Jalan BOH	Cameron Highlands	
C66	Pahang State Route C66	Jalan Batang Kali–Genting Highlands	Bentong	Selangor

=== Former state roads gazetted as federal roads ===
Route shield		Name	Name of roads	District	Interstate road: states crossed
Current	Former	Name	Name of roads	District	Interstate road: states crossed
FT 229	C173	Malaysia Federal Route 229	Jalan Permatang Badak	Kuantan	
FT 230	C17	Malaysia Federal Route 230	Jalan Kuantan–Cherok Paloh	Kuantan, Pekan	
FT 231	C4	Malaysia Federal Route 231	Jalan Sungai Lembing	Kuantan	
FT 236	C118	Malaysia Federal Route 231	Jalan Lanchang	Temerloh	

== Penang ==
Route shield	Name	Name of roads	District	Interstate road: states crossed
P1	Penang State Route P			
P3	Penang State Route P			
P10	Penang State Route P10	Jalan Batu Maung/Jalan Permatang Damar Laut	Southwest	
P13	Penang State Route P13	Jalan Air Itam		
P14	Penang State Route P14	Jalan Tun Sardon	Southwest, Northeast	
P123	Penang State Route P123	Jalan Tun Hamdan Sheikh Tahir	North Seberang Perai	
P176	Penang State Route P176	Jalan Juru	Central Seberang Perai	
P198	Penang State Route P198	Jalan Sungai Dua	North Seberang Perai, Central Seberang Perai	
P210	Penang State Route P210	Hill Railway Station Road	Northeast	
P243	Penang State Route P243	Jalan Pantai Aceh	Southwest	

=== Former state roads gazetted as federal roads ===
Route shield		Name	Name of roads	District	Interstate road: states crossed
Current	Former	Name	Name of roads	District	Interstate road: states crossed
FT 3112	P17	Malaysia Federal Route 3112	Jalan Perusahaan Perai	Central Seberang Perai	

== Perak ==
Route shield	Name	Name of roads	District	Interstate road: states crossed
A1	Perak State Route A1	Jalan Jelapang	Kinta	
A4	Perak State Route A4	Jalan Kerian	Kerian, Larut, Matang and Selama	
A5	Perak State Route A5	Jalan Ulu Sepetang–Redang Panjang	Larut, Matang and Selama	
A7	Perak State Route A7	Jalan Kubu Gajah–Taiping	Kerian, Larut, Matang and Selama	
A8	Perak State Route A8	Batu Gajah Highway	Kinta, Kampar	
A10	Perak State Route A10	Jalan Tapah	Batang Padang	
A11	Perak State Route A11	Jalan Sungai Temong	Kuala Kangsar	
A12	Perak State Route A12	Jalan Changkat Keruing	Manjung	
A13	Perak State Route A13	Jalan Tambun	Kinta	
A15	Perak State Route A15	Jalan Tanjung Tualang	Kinta, Perak Tengah	
A16	Perak State Route A16 (Note: Reused route number)	Jalan Labu Kubong	Hilir Perak	
A17	Perak State Route A17	Jalan Parit	Perak Tengah	
A18	Perak State Route A18	Jalan Bota Kiri	Perak Tengah	
A19	Perak State Route A19	Jalan Lintang Timur	Kuala Kangsar	
A20	Perak State Route A20	Jalan Lintang Barat	Kuala Kangsar	
A21	Perak State Route A21	Jalan Kubu Gajah–Lenggong	Hulu Perak, Larut, Matang and Selama	
A100	Perak State Route A100	Jalan Gula	Kerian	
A110	Perak State Route A110	Jalan Kota Baharu	Kampar	
A111	Perak State Route A111	Jalan Semanggol–Changkat Lobak	Kerian	
A114	Perak State Route A114	Jalan Malim Nawar	Kinta, Kampar	
A116	Perak State Route A116	Jalan Temoh	Batang Padang	
A117	Perak State Route A117	Jalan Pasir Panji	Kinta	
A118	Perak State Route A118	Jalan Sungai Chenderiang	Batang Padang	
A119	Perak State Route A119	Jalan Chenderiang	Batang Padang	
A120	Perak State Route A120	Jalan Banir	Batang Padang	
A121	Perak State Route A121	Jalan Slim	Mualim	
A122	Perak State Route A122	Jalan Chikus	Hilir Perak	
A123	Perak State Route A123	Jalan Hutan Melintang	Bagan Datuk	
A125	Perak State Route A125	Jalan Pekan Gurney	Manjung	
A127	Perak State Route A127	Jalan Gelung Pepuyu	Perak Tengah	
A131	Perak State Route A131	Jalan Kampung Poh	Batang Padang	
A132	Perak State Route A132	Jalan Paku	Batang Padang	
A134; B134	Perak State Route A134	Jalan Kuala Slim	Mualim	Selangor
A134	Perak State Route A136	Jalan Istana	Kuala Kangsar	
A147	Perak State Route A147	Jalan Padang Tembak	Hilir Perak	
A151	Perak State Route A151	Jalan Sultan Abdullah	Hilir Perak	
A171	Perak State Route A171	Jalan Temenggor	Hulu Perak	
A180	Perak State Route A180	Jalan Ayer Hitam Labu	Kinta, Kampar	
A183	Perak State Route A183	Jalan Bercham	Kinta	
A186	Perak State Route A186	Jalan Teluk Muroh	Manjung	
A187	Perak State Route A187	Jalan Pekan Sungkai	Batang Padang	
A189	Perak State Route A189	Jalan Changkat Sulaiman	Batang Padang	
A196	Perak State Route A196	Jalan Kuala Gula	Kerian	
A197	Perak State Route A197	Jalan Kampung Selamat	Kerian	

=== Former state roads gazetted as federal roads ===
Route shield		Name	Name of roads	District	Interstate road: states crossed
Current	Former	Name	Name of roads	District	Interstate road: states crossed
FT 136	A16; K16	Malaysia Federal Route 136	Jalan Kuala Ketil–Parit Buntar	Kerian	Kedah
FT 147	A6; A7	Malaysia Federal Route 147	Jalan Bagan Serai–Alor Pongsu–Selama	Kerian, Larut, Matang and Selama	
FT 171	A7; K7	Malaysia Federal Route 171	Jalan Serdang–Selama	Larut, Matang and Selama	Kedah
FT 185	A181	Malaysia Federal Route 185	Second East–West Highway	Kinta	Pahang; Kelantan; Terengganu
FT 193	A121 (Note: Behrang Ulu–Tanjung Malim side); A124 (Note: Entire route)	Malaysia Federal Route 193	Behrang–Tanjung Malim Highway	Mualim	
FT 3145	A177	Malaysia Federal Route 3145	Jalan Kampung Acheh	Manjung	
FT 3146	A2	Malaysia Federal Route 3146	Jalan Kamunting Lama	Larut, Matang and Selama	
FT 3152	A108	Malaysia Federal Route 3152	Batu Gajah Bypass	Kinta	

== Perlis ==
Route shield	Name	Name of roads	Interstate road: states crossed
R6	Perlis State Route R6	Jalan Arau–Changlun	Kedah
R13	Perlis State Route R13	Jalan Gua Kelam	

=== Former state roads gazetted as federal roads ===
Route shield		Name	Name of roads	Interstate road: states crossed
Current	Former	Name	Name of roads	Interstate road: states crossed
FT 226	R15	Malaysia Federal Route 226	Jalan Wang Kelian	

== Selangor ==
Route shield	Name	Name of roads	District	Interstate road: states crossed
B1	Selangor State Route B1	Jalan Meru	Kuala Selangor, Petaling, Klang	
B4	Selangor State Route B4	Jalan Haji Sirat	Klang	
B5	Selangor State Route B5	Jalan Dato' Mohd Sidin	Klang	
B9	Selangor State Route B9	Batu Tiga–Sungai Buloh Highway	Petaling	
B10	Selangor State Route B10	Jalan Johan Setia	Klang	
B11	Selangor State Route B11	Jalan Kajang–Puchong	Petaling, Sepang, Hulu Langat	
B11	Selangor State Route B11	Jalan Puchong–Dengkil	Petaling, Sepang, Hulu Langat	
B11	Selangor State Route B11	Jalan Puchong–Petaling Jaya	Petaling, Sepang, Hulu Langat	Kuala Lumpur
B13	Selangor State Route B13	Jalan Serdang	Petaling, Sepang, Hulu Langat	
B13	Selangor State Route B13	Jalan Uniten–Dengkil	Petaling, Sepang, Hulu Langat	
B13	Selangor State Route B13	Jalan Sungai Merab	Petaling, Sepang, Hulu Langat	
B14	Selangor State Route B14	Jalan Klang Lama	Petaling	Kuala Lumpur
B17	Selangor State Route B17	Jalan Reko/Jalan Bandar Baru Bangi	Hulu Langat	
B19	Selangor State Route B19	Jalan Semenyih	Hulu Langat	
B21	Selangor State Route B21	Kepong–Selayang Highway	Gombak	
B22	Selangor State Route B22	Jalan Batu Caves	Gombak	
B23	Selangor State Route B23	Jalan Sungai Tua–Ulu Yam	Hulu Selangor, Gombak	
B24	Selangor State Route B24	Jalan Enam Kaki	Hulu Langat	
B25	Selangor State Route B25	Jalan Kuang	Gombak	
B26	Selangor State Route B26	Jalan Teras Jernang	Hulu Langat	
B27	Selangor State Route B27	Jalan Rawang–Bestari Jaya	Gombak, Kuala Selangor	
B31	Selangor State Route B31	Jalan Ampang	Hulu Langat	Kuala Lumpur
B32; N32	Selangor State Route B32	Jalan Semenyih–Kuala Klawang	Hulu Langat	Negeri Sembilan
B33	Selangor State Route B33	Jalan Kuala Selangor–Bestari Jaya	Kuala Selangor	
B34	Selangor State Route B34	Jalan Broga	Hulu Langat	Negeri Sembilan
B35	Selangor State Route B35	Jalan Bukit Badong	Kuala Selangor	
B36	Selangor State Route B36	Jalan Kerja Ayer Lama	Hulu Langat	
B37	Selangor State Route B37	Jalan Bukit Belimbing	Kuala Selangor	
B38	Selangor State Route B38	Jalan Sungai Pusu	Gombak	
B42	Selangor State Route B42	Jalan Tanjung Karang–Bestari Jaya	Kuala Selangor	
B44	Selangor State Route B44	Jalan Sabak Bernam–Hulu Selangor	Sabak Bernam, Hulu Selangor	
B46	Selangor State Route B46	Jalan Parit Baru/Jalan Sungai Tengar	Sabak Bernam	
B48	Selangor State Route B48	Jalan Besar Salak	Sepang	
B49	Selangor State Route B49	Persiaran Mokhtar Dahari	Kuala Selangor, Petaling	
B52	Selangor State Route B52	Jalan Hulu Langat	Hulu Langat	
B53	Selangor State Route B53	Jalan Bagan Terap	Sabak Bernam	
B54	Selangor State Route B54	Jalan Ampang Pechah	Hulu Selangor	
B55	Selangor State Route B55	Jalan Sungai Air Tawar	Sabak Bernam	
B57	Selangor State Route B57	Jalan Ulu Yam	Hulu Selangor	
B58	Selangor State Route B58	Jalan Sultan Abdul Samad	Kuala Langat	
B59	Selangor State Route B59	Jalan Kelanang	Kuala Langat	
B60	Selangor State Route B60	Jalan Cheeding	Kuala Langat	
B62	Selangor State Route B62	Jalan Ampang–Hulu Langat	Hulu Langat	
B66	Selangor State Route B66	Jalan Batang Kali–Genting Highlands	Hulu Selangor	Pahang
B74	Selangor State Route B74	Jalan Sungai Tengi	Kuala Selangor, Hulu Selangor	
B77	Selangor State Route B77	Jalan Kampung Kuantan	Kuala Selangor	
B111	Selangor State Route B111	Jalan Batu Arang	Gombak	
B113	Selangor State Route B113	Jalan Batang Kali–Hulu Yam Bharu	Hulu Selangor	
B116	Selangor State Route B116	Jalan Sungai Tekali	Hulu Langat	
B124	Selangor State Route B124	Jalan Serdang Belah	Kuala Langat	
B125	Selangor State Route B125	Jalan Sultan Sulaiman Shah	Kuala Langat	
B134; A134	Selangor State Route B134	Jalan Kuala Slim	Hulu Selangor	Perak

=== Former state roads gazetted as federal roads ===
Route shield		Name	Name of roads	District	Interstate road: states crossed
Current	Former	Name	Name of roads	District	Interstate road: states crossed
FT 31	B18	Malaysia Federal Route 31	Jalan Banting–Semenyih	Kuala Langat, Sepang, Hulu Langat	
FT 32	B20; N20	Malaysia Federal Route 32	Labohan Dagang–Nilai Route	Kuala Langat, Sepang	Negeri Sembilan
FT 190	B3; B12	Malaysia Federal Route 190	Jalan Kota Raja/Jalan Sungai Kandis/Jalan Bukit Kemuning/Jalan Kebun	Klang, Petaling	
FT 214	B15	Malaysia Federal Route 214	Jalan Putrajaya–Dengkil	Sepang	Negeri Sembilan
FT 286	B7	Malaysia Federal Route 286	Shah Alam–Puchong Highway (Note: Formerly Federal Route 3214)	Petaling	
FT 287	B9	Malaysia Federal Route 287	Jalan Subang–Batu Tiga (Note: Formerly Federal Route 3214)	Petaling	
FT 1266	N68	Malaysia Federal Route 1266	Jalan FELDA LB Johnson	Sepang	Negeri Sembilan
FT 3215	B16	Malaysia Federal Route 3215	Jalan Seri Kembangan	Petaling	
FT 3216	B6	Malaysia Federal Route 3216	Jalan Batu Tiga Lama	Klang, Petaling	
FT 3217	B1; B2	Malaysia Federal Route 3217	Jalan Perindustrian Kapar–Meru	Klang	
FT 3218	B8	Malaysia Federal Route 3218	Jalan Kim Chuan	Klang	
FT 3265	N36	Malaysia Federal Route 3265	Jalan Nilai–Pajam	Sepang	Negeri Sembilan

== Terengganu ==
Route shield	Name	Name of roads	District	Interstate road: states crossed
T3	Terengganu State Route T3		Besut	
T5	Terengganu State Route T5	Jalan Pasir Akar	Besut	
T124	Terengganu State Route T124	Jalan Mak Lagam	Kemaman	
T134	Terengganu State Route T134	Jalan Jenagur	Hulu Terengganu	
T139	Terengganu State Route T139	Jalan Matang–Nibong–Telemong	Hulu Terengganu	
T143	Terengganu State Route T143	Jalan Tengku Ampuan Bariah	Kuala Nerus	
T174	Terengganu State Route T174	Jalan Kampung Buloh	Hulu Terengganu	

=== Former state roads gazetted as federal roads ===
Route shield		Name	Name of roads	District	Interstate road: states crossed
Current	Former	Name	Name of roads	District	Interstate road: states crossed
FT 65	T3	Malaysia Federal Route 65	Jalan Tengku Ampuan Intan Zaharah	Setiu, Kuala Nerus	
FT 65	T3	Malaysia Federal Route 65	Jalan Kampung Raja–Kampung Che Selamah	Besut, Setiu	
FT 65	T4	Malaysia Federal Route 65	Jalan Tengku Mizan	Kuala Nerus, Kuala Terengganu	
FT 189	T7; D7; D11	Malaysia Federal Route 189	Jalan Pesisiran Pantai Kelantan	Besut	Kelantan
FT 215	T215	Malaysia Federal Route 215	Jalan Tengku Mohammad	Kuala Nerus	
FT 247	T11	Malaysia Federal Route 247	Jalan Sungai Tong–Kuala Berang	Setiu, Hulu Terengganu	
FT 285	T1	Malaysia Federal Route 285	Jalan Merang	Setiu	

== Sabah ==
Sabah does not have a legal framework for state roads, as the Highway Ordinance 1947 does not grant the government the authority to gazette roads as state roads nor the definition of a state road. Nevertheless, six roads use "state road" route codes, although these designations are cosmetic and have no legal effect.

Route shield	Name	Name of roads	Division	Route Description
SA2	Sabah Route SA2	Jalan Tambunan–Ranau	West Coast, Interior	A highway that serve as a connectivity between Tambunan and Ranau, as it runs through valley between the Crocker Range and Trusmadi Range. It was also part of the Interior North–South Highway, which serves as a highway connectivity from Ranau until Kemabong.
SA3	Sabah Route SA3	Jalan Sipitang–Tenom	Interior	A 71 kilometres (44 mi) state highway that serves as a connection between Tenom and Sipitang. It crosses the Crocker Range within the Mount Lumaku forest reserve.
SA13	Sabah Route SA13	Jalan Kunak	Tawau	Coded for the Kunak spur road, and also a vital link to Semporna from Kunak.
SA33	Sabah Route SA33	Jalan Kuala Tomani	Interior	A state highway located along the Route SA3 in Tenom. Part of the Interior North–South Highway, until Kemabong only.
SA51	Sabah Route SA51	Jalan Tawau–Semporna	Tawau	A 60 kilometres (37 mi) state highway that serves to connect Tawau to Semporna.
SA71	Sabah Route SA71	Jalan Kuala Penyu–Tamu Kayul	Interior	It was a short 10 kilometres (6.2 mi) roads, that serves as an immediate transport from Menumbok and Beaufort.

== Sarawak ==
Sarawak's route numbering system does not adhere to divisional boundaries. Nonetheless, some numbering patterns appear to exist, such as the concentration of several Q14X routes in the Samarahan Division.

Route shield	Name	Name of roads	Division	District
Q7	Sarawak Route Q7	Jalan Sri Aman Access	Sri Aman	Sri Aman
Q13	Sarawak Route Q13	Jalan Canna Kuching - Samarahan Expressway Jalan Lingkaran Luar Kuching	Kuching Samarahan	Kuching Samarahan Siburan
Q14	Sarawak Route Q14	Kuching - Samarahan - Asajaya Expressway	Samarahan	Samarahan
Q142	Sarawak Route Q142	Jalan Kota Samarahan - Sadong Jaya	Samarahan	Asajaya
Q143	Sarawak Route Q143	Jalan Kelait / Entangor	Samarahan	Sebuyau
Q146	Sarawak Route Q146	Jalan Kpg Semera	Samarahan	Asajaya
Q147	Sarawak Route Q147	Tungkah Melayu / Kg Tungkah Dayak / Melayu Arus / Sebangan Road	Samarahan	Sebuyau
Q149	Sarawak Route Q149	Jln Sembawang / Kpg Melayu	Samarahan	Samarahan
Q150	Sarawak Route Q150	Jln Ensengei Baki	Samarahan	Samarahan
Q151	Sarawak Route Q151	Jln Ensengei	Serian	Siburan
Q153	Sarawak Route Q153	Jalan Old Kuching - Serian	Serian	Siburan
Q171	Sarawak Route Q171	Jalan Batu Lintang	Sri Aman	Sri Aman
