= Kedah State Route K1 =

Road in Malaysia

Kedah Route 1
- Jalan Pantai Barat Kedah; Jalan Kuala Kedah–Yan Kechil (Kota Setar); Jalan Kuala Kedah–Simpang Tiga Kampung Pasir (Yan); Jalan Bedong–Singkir (Kuala Muda) 吉打西海岸公路
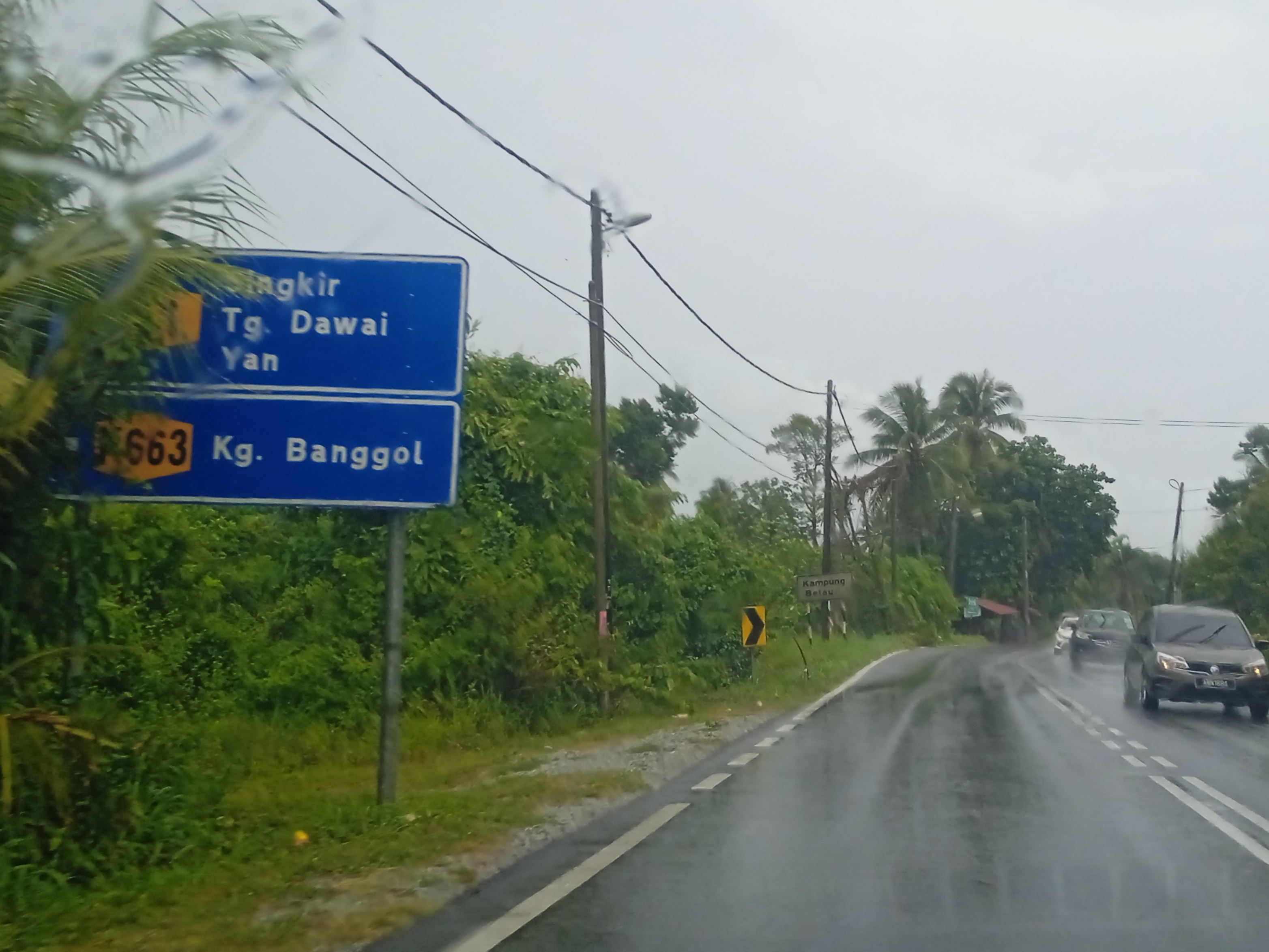
- State Route K1 in Kuala Muda District, Kedah

Route information
- Maintained by Malaysian Public Works Department Kedah State
- Length: 70 km (43 mi)

Major junctions
- North end: Kuala Kedah, Kedah
- Road: FT 78 Federal Route 78; K132 State Route K132; K161 State Route K161; K631 State Route K631; K150 State Route K150; K165 State Route K165; K167 State Route K167; FT 253 Semeling Bypass; FT 1 Federal Route 1
- South end: Bedong, Kedah

Location
- Country: Malaysia
- Primary destinations: Kampung Sungai Limau, Yan, Singkir, Merbok, Semeling, Bedong

Highway system
- Highways in Malaysia; Expressways; Federal; State

Kedah State Route K1, Jalan Pantai Barat Kedah, Jalan Kuala Kedah–Yan Kechil, Jalan Kuala Kedah–Simpang Tiga Kampung Pasir and Jalan Bedong–Singkir is a major road in the Malaysian state of Kedah. It connects Bedong, Kuala Muda to Kuala Kedah, Kota Setar, traversing paddy fields Yan to Kuala Kedah. The road travels along the west coast of Kedah and is alternate of Federal Route 1 and North–South Expressway Northern Route from Gurun to Alor Setar. Kilometer zero is located at Bedong, Kedah.

== History ==
On 13 October 2025, seven unit beams for Yan Besar River Bridge and Bujang River Bridge (Tupah) replacement projects at State Route K1. The projects are implemented by Malaysian Public Works Department Kedah through JKR Yan District.

== Junction lists ==
The entire route is located in Kedah.

Legend:

- I/C - Interchange, I/S - Intersection, RSA - Rest and service area, OBR - Overhead bridge restaurant, R/R - Restaurant and rest plaza, L/B - Layby, V/P - Vista point, TN - tunnel, T/P - Toll plaza, BR - Bridge
- C - Cloverleaf, S - Stack, T-A - Trumpet-A, T-B - Trumpet-B, DT - Directional-T/Y, SDT - Semi-Directional-T/Y, P-Y - Partial-Y, D - Diamond, P-C - Partial cloverleaf, D-D - Diverging diamond, D-R - Direct ramp

District	Location	km	mi	Name	Destinations	Notes
Kota Setar	Kuala Kedah	70.0	43.5	Kuala Kedah	FT 78 Malaysia Federal Route 78 – Kuala Kedah, Simpang Kuala, Alor Setar, Jitra, Gurun, Butterworth; North–South Expressway Northern Route / AH2 – Bukit Kayu Hitam, Kuala Lumpur	T-Junctions
Kota Setar	Alor Ibus			Alor Ibus	K132 Kedah State Route K132 – Tandop, Gurun, Sungai Petani; North–South Expressway Northern Route / AH2 – Bukit Kayu Hitam, Jitra, Alor Setar, Pendang, Butterworth, Georgetown, Ipoh, Kuala Lumpur	T-junctions
Kota Setar	Kangkong			Simpang Empat Kangkong	K130 Kedah State Route K130 – Kuala Kangkong, Simpang Empat, Tokai	Junctions
Kota Setar	Kuala Sala			Kuala Sala	K362 Jalan Sala – Kuala Sala, Kota Sarang Semut	Junctions
Kota Setar–Yan district border				Padang Terap River Bridge		
Yan	Sungai Limau			Sungai Dedap		
Yan	Sungai Limau			Sungai Limau Dalam	K142 Jalan Sungai Limau Luar – Sungai Limau Luar, Sungai Petani	T-junctions
Yan	Sungai Limau			Sungai Limau		
Yan	Dulang			Sedaka		
Yan	Dulang			Ulu Sedaka	K144 Jalan Ulu Sedaka – Ulu Sedaka, Batu 17	T-junctions
Yan	Dulang			Dulang		
Yan	Dulang			Ulu Dulang Kechil	K453 Jalan Ulu Dulang Kechil – Ulu Dulang Kechil	T-junctions
Yan	Dulang			Dulang Kechil		
Yan	Yan			Yan Kechil		
Yan	Yan			Yan Kechil	K148 Kedah State Route K148 – Perigi, Peranginan Sri Perigi; K146 Kedah State Route K146 – Titi Serong, Teroi, Guar Chempedak; North–South Expressway Northern Route / AH2 – Alor Setar, Kuala Lumpur	Junctions
Yan	Yan			Yan	Yan Hospital	
Yan	Yan			Yan Besar	K454 Kedah State Route K454 – Kampung Sungai Udang	T-junctions
Yan	Yan			Yan Besar	K455 Kedah State Route K455 – Pantai Murni, Hutan Rekreasi Batu Hampar, Hutan Lipur Titi Hayun, Program Homestay Kampung Raga	Junctions
Yan	Yan			Ruat		
Kuala Muda	Merbok			Tanjung Jaga; Viaduct		
Kuala Muda	Merbok			Singkir Darat		
Kuala Muda	Merbok			Tanjung Dawai	K161 Kedah State Route K161 – Tanjung Dawai	T-junctions
Kuala Muda	Merbok			Singkir		
Kuala Muda	Merbok			Singkir Darat		
Kuala Muda	Merbok			Kampung Badong		
Kuala Muda	Merbok			Pengkalan Kakap	K636 Kedah State Route K636 – Pengkalan Kakap, Batu Hampar	T-junctions
Kuala Muda	Merbok			Lembah Bujang	K631 Kedah State Route K631 – Bujang Valley Archeology Museum	T-junctions; Historical site
Kuala Muda	Merbok			Batu Hampar	K150 Jalan Merbok–Batu Hampar – Merbok, Batu Hampar	T-junctions
Kuala Muda	Merbok			Merbok		
Kuala Muda	Merbok			Jalan Rekreasi Tupah	K165 Kedah State Route K165 – Rekreasi Tupah	T-junctions
Kuala Muda	Semeling			Semeling Bypass	FT 253 Semeling Bypass – Taman Lembah Bujang, Kampung Pekan Sebelah	T-junctions
Kuala Muda	Semeling			UiTM Merbok		
Kuala Muda	Semeling			Kampung Paya Suri	K167 Kedah State Route K167 – Kampung Paya Suri, Taman Desa Semeling	Junctions
Kuala Muda	Semeling			Semeling	FT 253 Semeling Bypass – Taman Semeling, Sungai Petani	T-junctions
Kuala Muda	Semeling			Universiti Aimst		T-junctions
Kuala Muda	Bedong	0.0	0.0	Bedong	FT 1 Malaysia Federal Route 1 – Alor Setar, Kota Sarang Semut, Guar Chempedak, Gurun, Sungai Petani	T-junctions
1.000 mi = 1.609 km; 1.000 km = 0.621 mi: Concurrency terminus
