= Semeling Bypass =

Road in Malaysia

Federal Route 253
- Semeling Bypass

Route information
- Length: 14.1 km (8.8 mi)

Major junctions
- Beltway around Semeling
- East end: Taman Tasek Indah
- K1 Jalan Pantai Barat Kedah; K167 Jalan Raya Semeling
- West end: Tupah

Location
- Country: Malaysia
- Primary destinations: Semeling; Merbok

Highway system
- Highways in Malaysia; Expressways; Federal; State

Semeling Bypass, Federal Route 253, is a major highway bypass in Semeling, Kuala Muda District, Kedah, Malaysia. The Kilometre Zero is located at Taman Tasek Indah junctions near Semeling.

== History ==
In 2012, the highway was gazetted as Federal Route 253.

== Features ==
At most sections, the Federal Route 253 was built under the JKR R5 road standard, allowing maximum speed limit of up to 90 km/h.

== List of junctions ==
| Km | Exit | Junctions | To | Remarks |
|---|---|---|---|---|
| FT 253; 0 | 1 | Taman Tasek Indah Junctions | North; Jalan Tasek Indah 2 Taman Tasek Indah K1 Jalan Pantai Barat Kedah West; K1 Semeling Town Centre East; K1 Bedong; FT 1 Guar Chempedak; FT 1 Gurun | 4-way intersections |
FT 253 Semeling Bypass; Start/End of highway
| | 2 | Taman Malinja Junctions | Jalan Malinja West; Taman Malinja; Semeling Town Centre East; Kampung Thye Eng | 4-way intersections |
| | 3 | Semeling South Junctions | K167 Jalan Raya Semeling North; K167 Semeling Town Centre South; K167 Sungai Petani; North–South Expressway Northern Route AH2 North–South Expressway Northern Route; Bukit Kayu Hitam; Alor Star; Penang; Kuala Lumpur | 4-way intersections |
| | | Kampung Sungai Batu | | |
| | | Kampung Permatang Samak | | |
| | 4 | Pekan Sebalah Junctions' | K163 Jalan Pekan Sebalah Northeast; Semeling Town Centre; Universiti Teknologi MARA (UiTM) Merbok Campus Southwest; Pekan Sebalah; Sungai Gelam | 4-way intersections |
| | | Taman Lembah Bujang | | |
| | 5 | Jalan Ladang Sungai Batu Junctions | West; K633 Jalan Ladang Sungai Batu; Ladang Sungai Batu | 3-way intersections |
FT 253 Semeling Bypass; Start/End of highway
| | 6 | Bujang Junctions | K1 Jalan Pantai Barat Kedah West; K1 Merbok; K1 Yan; K1 Tanjung Dawai; K1 Bujang Valley Archeological Museum East; K1 Semeling Town Centre | 3-way intersections |
