= Penunus =

Settlement in the Saratok division of Sarawak, Malaysia

- Location within Borneo
- Coordinates: 1.56667°N 111.45°E
- Country: Malaysia
- State: Sarawak
- Administrative Division: Saratok
- Elevation: 104 m (341 ft)

Penunus (also known as Rumah Chundla or Rumah Chundie) is a settlement in the Saratok division of Sarawak, Malaysia. It lies approximately 124.2 kilometres (77 mi) east of the state capital Kuching.

Neighbouring settlements include:

- Rumah Entri 1.9 kilometres (1.2 mi) north
- Rumah Chuat 1.9 kilometres (1.2 mi) north
- Dulang 1.9 kilometres (1.2 mi) north
- Rumah Renggan 2.6 kilometres (1.6 mi) northwest
- Teru 2.6 kilometres (1.6 mi) northeast
- Suri Debak 2.6 kilometres (1.6 mi) southwest
- Debak 3.7 kilometres (2.3 mi) west
- Rumah Gara 3.7 kilometres (2.3 mi) east
- Lakis 3.7 kilometres (2.3 mi) west
- Babu 3.7 kilometres (2.3 mi) north
