= Bujang =

Bujang is the Malaysian word for bachelor, and may refer to:

== Movies ==
- Bujang Lapok (film series) (1957–1985)
- Ali Baba Bujang Lapok (1961)

== People ==
- Ahmad Lai Bujang (1949–2019), Malaysian politician
- Hardi Bujang (born 1984), Bruneian footballer
- Karim Bujang (born 1953), Malaysian politician
- Mardi Anak Bujang (born 1984), Bruneian footballer
- Tuanku Bujang (1898–1986), Malaysian politician

== Places ==
- Bujang Valley, valley in Malaysia
- Jalan Lembah Bujang, road in Malaysia
