= Jalan FELDA Besout =

Road in Malaysia

Federal Route 1154
- Jalan FELDA Besout
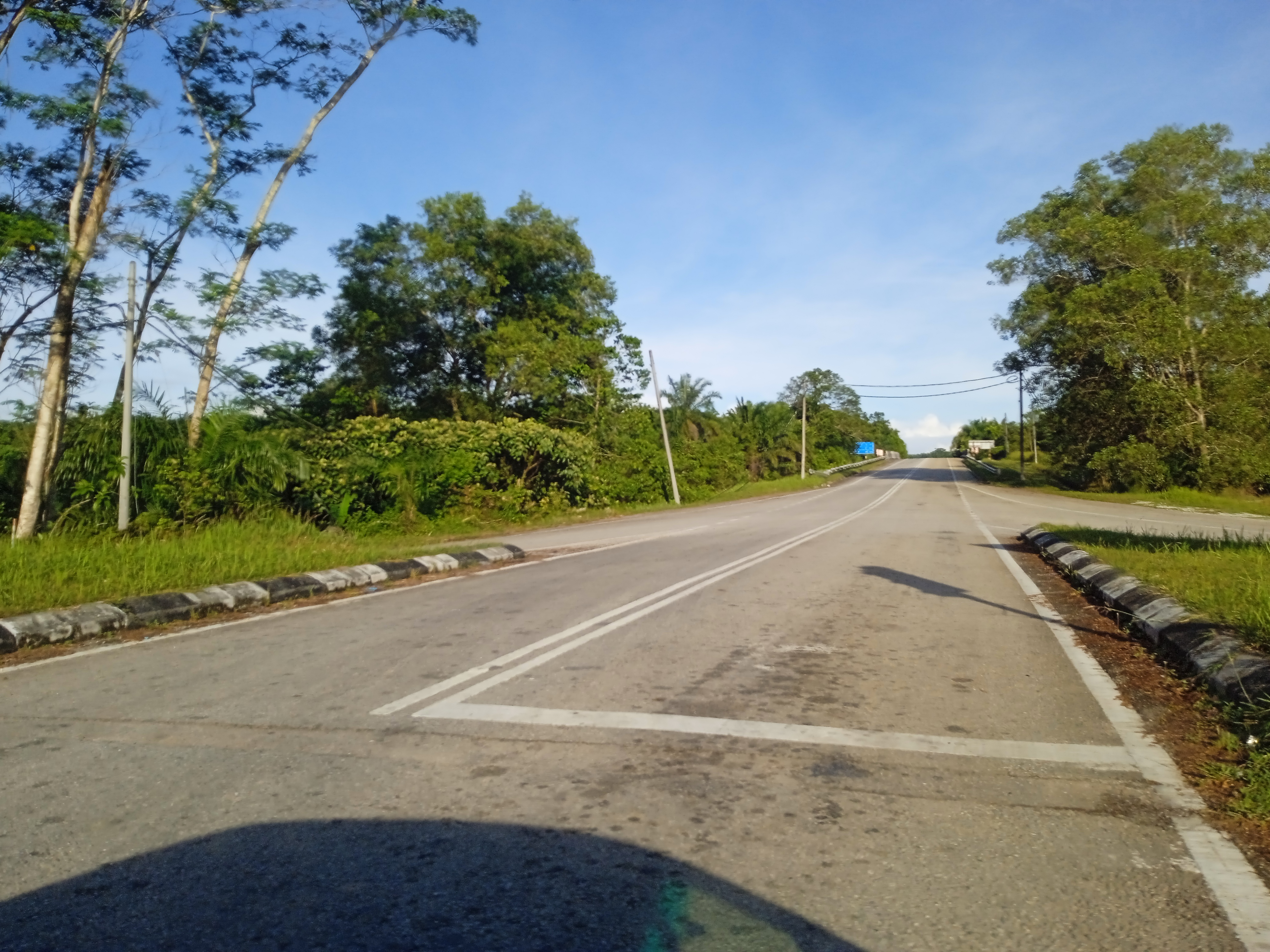

Route information
- Maintained by Malaysian Public Works Department

Major junctions
- East end: Trolak
- FT 1 Federal route 1
- West end: FELDA Besout

Location
- Country: Malaysia

Highway system
- Highways in Malaysia; Expressways; Federal; State

Jalan FELDA Besout, Federal Route 1154, is a Federal Land Development Authority (FELDA) road in Perak, Malaysia. The Kilometre Zero is located at Trolak.

At most sections, the Federal Route 1154 was built under the JKR R5 road standard, with a speed limit of 90 km/h.

== List of junctions ==
km	Exit	Junctions	To	Remarks
FT 1154 (1154); 0		Terolak	North; FT 1 Ipoh; FT 1 Tapah; FT 1 Bidor; FT 1 Sungkai; North–South Expressway Northern Route AH2 North–South Expressway Northern Route; Bukit Kayu Hitam; Penang; Ipoh South; FT 1 Tanjung Malim; FT 1 Slim River; North–South Expressway Northern Route AH2 North–South Expressway Northern Route; Kuala Lumpur; Rawang; Tanjung Malim	T-junctions
		Railway crossing bridge		
Muallim–Batang Padang district border
		Jalan Changkat Sulaiman	Northeast; A189 Jalan Changkat Sulaiman; Changkat Sulaiman; Sungkai; North–South Expressway Northern Route AH2 North–South Expressway Northern Route; Bukit Kayu Hitam; Penang; Ipoh	T-junctions
FELDA Besout; FELDA Besout border arch
FELDA Auxiliary Police post
		Palm Oil Mill		
		FELDA Besout; FELDA Besout 1, 2 and 3	East; Jalan FELDA Besout 1; 1, 2 and 3	T-junctions
		FELDA Besout; FELDA Besout 4 and 5		
