= A131 =

A131 may refer to:

- A131 road (England), a road connecting Boreham near Chelmsford and Sudbury
- A131 motorway (France), a French motorway connecting the A13 and Le Havre
- A131 road (Malaysia), a road in Perak connecting Bidor and Kampung Poh
- RFA Reliant (A131), a 1976 Royal Fleet Auxiliary helicopter support ship
