= J52 =

J52 may refer to:

- Augmented pentagonal prism
- HMS Dunoon (J52), a Hunt-class minesweeper of the Royal Navy
- HMS Guysborough (J52), a Bangor-class minesweeper of the Royal Navy and Royal Canadian Navy
- LNER Class J52, a British steam locomotive class
- Jalan Tanjung Pengelih, Johor State Route J52
- Pratt & Whitney J52, a turbojet engine
