= Pahang State Route C19 =

Road in Malaysia

Pahang Route 19
- Jalan Belimbing

Major junctions
- North end: Kampung Batu 37
- FT 2 Federal Route 2 C106 Jalan Belimbing–Pahang Tua
- South end: Belimbing

Location
- Country: Malaysia
- Primary destinations: FELCRA Seri Makmur; Lake Chini

Highway system
- Highways in Malaysia; Expressways; Federal; State

Jalan Belimbing (Pahang State Route C19) is a major road in Pahang, Malaysia. It is also a main route to Chini Lake.

== Junction lists ==
The entire route is located in Pahang.

Legend:

- I/C - Interchange, I/S - Intersection, RSA - Rest and service area, OBR - Overhead bridge restaurant, R/R - Restaurant and rest plaza, L/B - Layby, V/P - Vista point, TN - tunnel, T/P - Toll plaza, BR - Bridge

| District | Location | km | Name | Destinations | Notes |
|---|---|---|---|---|---|
| Maran | Maran | | Kampung Batu 37 | FT 2 Malaysia Federal Route 2 – Temerloh, Maran, Gambang, Kuantan; East Coast Expressway – Kuala Lumpur, Kuala Terengganu | T-junctions |
| Pekan | Seri Makmur | | FELCRA Seri Makmur | | |
| Pekan | Seri Makmur | | Kampung Tanah Merah | | |
| Pekan | Seri Makmur | | Jalan Belimbing–Pahang Tua | C106 Jalan Belimbing–Pahang Tua – Paluh Hinai, Permatang Lanjut, Pahang Tua, Pekan | T-junctions |
| Pekan | Seri Makmur | | Kampung Sungai Pinang | | |
| Pekan | Seri Makmur | | Kampung Serdang | | |
| Pekan | Seri Makmur | | Kampung Rambai Sebunga | Lubuk Paku | T-junctions |
| Pekan | Seri Makmur | | Kampung Lunang | | |
| Pekan | Seri Makmur | | Kampung Belimbing Hilir | | |
| Pekan | Seri Makmur | | Belimbing | | |
| Maran | Serengkam | | Science 10 | | |
| Maran | Serengkam | | Lubuk Paku–Bak-Bak–Serengkam | C21 Jalan Lubuk Paku – Serengkam, Lubuk Paku, Kampung Serdang, Kampung Belembung, Kampung Senggora, Kampung Bawang, Dusun Tok Bendul, Kampung Paya Pasir; C133 Jalan Bak-Bak–Serengkam – Kampung Bak-Bak, Maran town centre | T-junctions |
1.000 mi = 1.609 km; 1.000 km = 0.621 mi
