= Perak State Route A21 =

Road in Malaysia

Perak Route 21
- Jalan Kubu Gajah–Sumpitan (Lenggong)

Route information
- Maintained by Malaysian Public Works Department (JKR) Perak

Major junctions
- West end: Kubu Gajah
- FT 147 Federal Route 147; A7 State Route A7; A41 State Route A41; FT 1148 Federal Route 1148; A5 State Route A5; A113 State Route A113; FT 76 Federal Route 76
- East end: Lenggong

Location
- Country: Malaysia
- Primary destinations: Batu Kurau

Highway system
- Highways in Malaysia; Expressways; Federal; State

Perak State Route A21, Jalan Kubu Gajah–Sumpitan (Lenggong) (formerly State Route A6) is a major road in Perak, Malaysia.

== History ==
The Jalan Bagan Serai–Kubu Gajah–Sumpitan (Lenggong) previously designated as State Route A6. The Bagan Serai–Kubu Gajah is gazetted as part of Federal Route 147, the remain sections (Kubu Gajah–Lenggong) is gazetted as State Route A21.

The entire route of A21 Jalan Kubu Gajah–Sumpitan closed from 25 September 2023 at 10 am until 3 October 2023 at 11.59, within 9 days for the landslide at Section 25 until 33.

== Junction lists ==
The entire route is located in Perak.

Legend:

- I/C - Interchange, I/S - Intersection, RSA - Rest and service area, OBR - Overhead bridge restaurant, R/R - Restaurant and rest plaza, L/B - Layby, V/P - Vista point, TN - tunnel, T/P - Toll plaza, BR - Bridge
- C - Cloverleaf, S - Stack, T-A - Trumpet-A, T-B - Trumpet-B, DT - Directional-T/Y, SDT - Semi-Directional-T/Y, P-Y - Partial-Y, D - Diamond, P-C - Partial cloverleaf, D-D - Diverging diamond, D-R - Direct ramp

District	Location	km	mi	Name	Destinations	Notes
Larut, Matang and Selama	Kubu Gajah			Kubu Gajah	FT 147 Malaysia Federal Route 147 – Selama, Rantau Panjang, Sungai Bayor, Kulim, Bagan Serai, Alor Pongsu, Parit Buntar; North–South Expressway Northern Route / AH2 – Bukit Kayu Hitam, Penang, Bandar Baharu, Taiping, Ipoh, Kuala Lumpur; A7 Perak State Route A7 – Pondok Tanjung, Batu Kurau, Kamunting, Taiping	Junctions
Larut, Matang and Selama	Kubu Gajah			Kampung Baharu Dendang	A41 Perak State Route A41 – Selama	T-junctions
Larut, Matang and Selama	Kubu Gajah			Kampung Sungai Lempong		
Larut, Matang and Selama	Kubu Gajah			Kampung Sungai Limau		
Larut, Matang and Selama	Kubu Gajah			Kampung Baharu Sungai Dendang		
Larut, Matang and Selama	Kubu Gajah			Kampung Bagan Baharu	FT 1148 Jalan Bagan Baharu – Ijok	T-junctions
Larut, Matang and Selama	Kubu Gajah			Kampung Pengkalan Rambai		
Larut, Matang and Selama	Kubu Gajah			Kampung Sungai Segar		
Larut, Matang and Selama	Kubu Gajah			Kampung Jalan Baru		
Larut, Matang and Selama	Kubu Gajah			Sungai Segar	A5 Perak State Route A5 – Batu Kurau	T-junctions
Larut, Matang and Selama	Kubu Gajah			Redang Panjang		
Larut, Matang and Selama	Kubu Gajah			Kampung Tok Budi; Kampung Kota Raja Bersiong		
Larut, Matang and Selama	Kubu Gajah			Kampung Ayer Gelugor		
Larut, Matang and Selama	Kubu Gajah			Kampung Banggul	A113 Jalan Seputeh – Kampung Seputeh, Batu Kurau	T-junctions
Larut, Matang and Selama	Kubu Gajah			Kampung Banggol Kolam; Kampung Masjid		
Larut, Matang and Selama	Kubu Gajah			Kampung Sangkut		
Larut, Matang and Selama	Kubu Gajah			Kampung Siam		
Larut, Matang and Selama	Kubu Gajah			Kampung Charok Kelantan		
Larut, Matang and Selama	Kubu Gajah			Kampung Kelian Gunong		
Larut, Matang and Selama	Kubu Gajah			Bukit Sumpitan; 550 m above sea level		
Hulu Perak	Lenggong			Bukit Sumpitan; 550 m above sea level		
Hulu Perak	Lenggong			Sungai Temelong		
Hulu Perak	Lenggong			Lenggong; Kampung Sumpitan	FT 76 Malaysia Federal Route 76 – Gerik, Baling, Kota Bharu, Pulau Banding, Lenggong, Kuala Kangsar, Ipoh, Lata Kekabu waterfall, Lenggong historical complex, Chenderoh Lake	T-junctions
1.000 mi = 1.609 km; 1.000 km = 0.621 mi
