= Selangor State Route B77 =

Road in Malaysia

Selangor Route 77
- Jalan Kampung Kuantan / Jalan Kelab
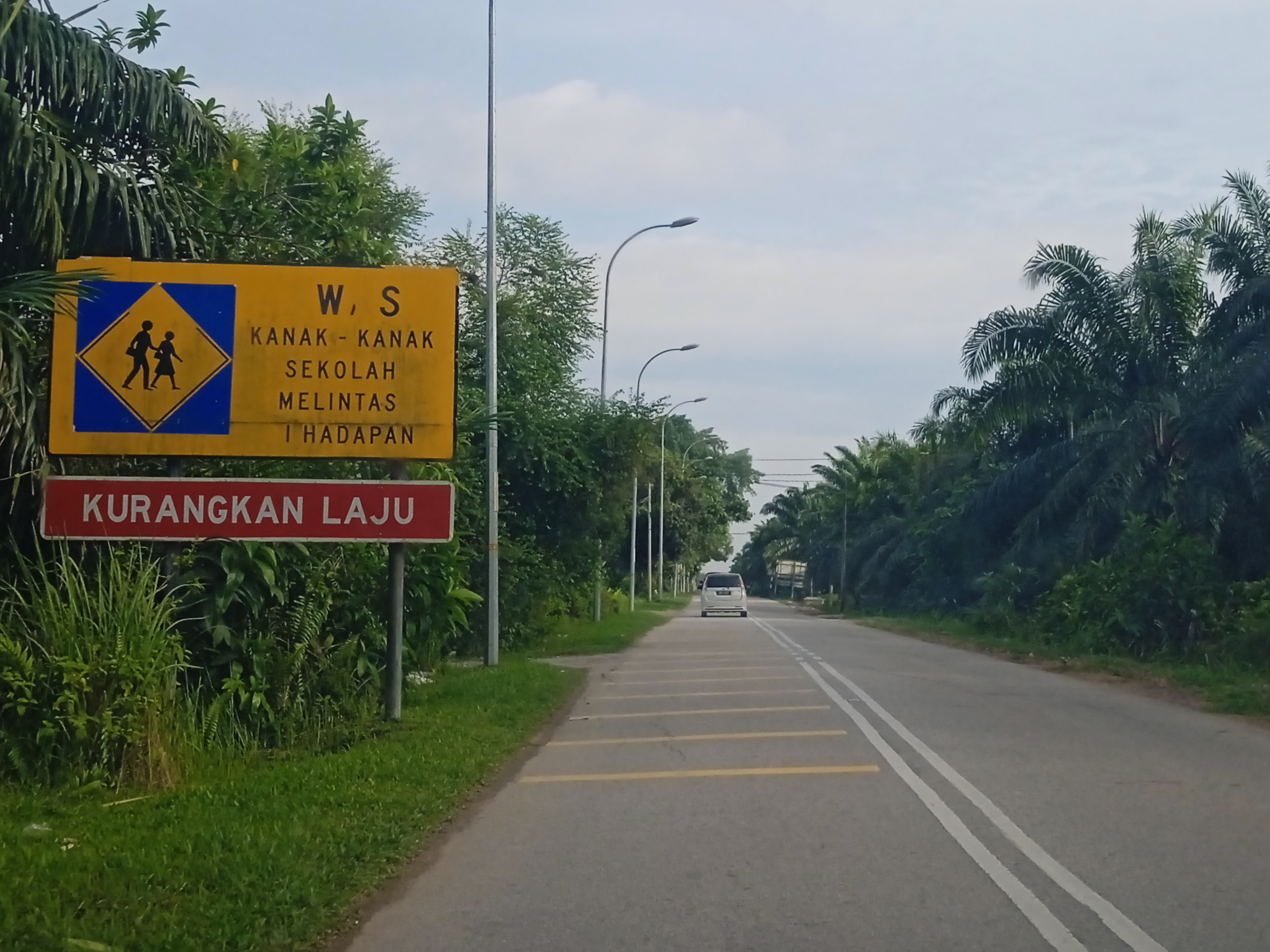
- Jalan Kampung Kuantan heading towards north

Major junctions
- North end: Kampung Kuantan
- B33 State Route B33; FT 54 Federal Route 54
- South end: Bukit Rotan

Location
- Country: Malaysia
- Primary destinations: Kuala Selangor, Bestari Jaya

Highway system
- Highways in Malaysia; Expressways; Federal; State

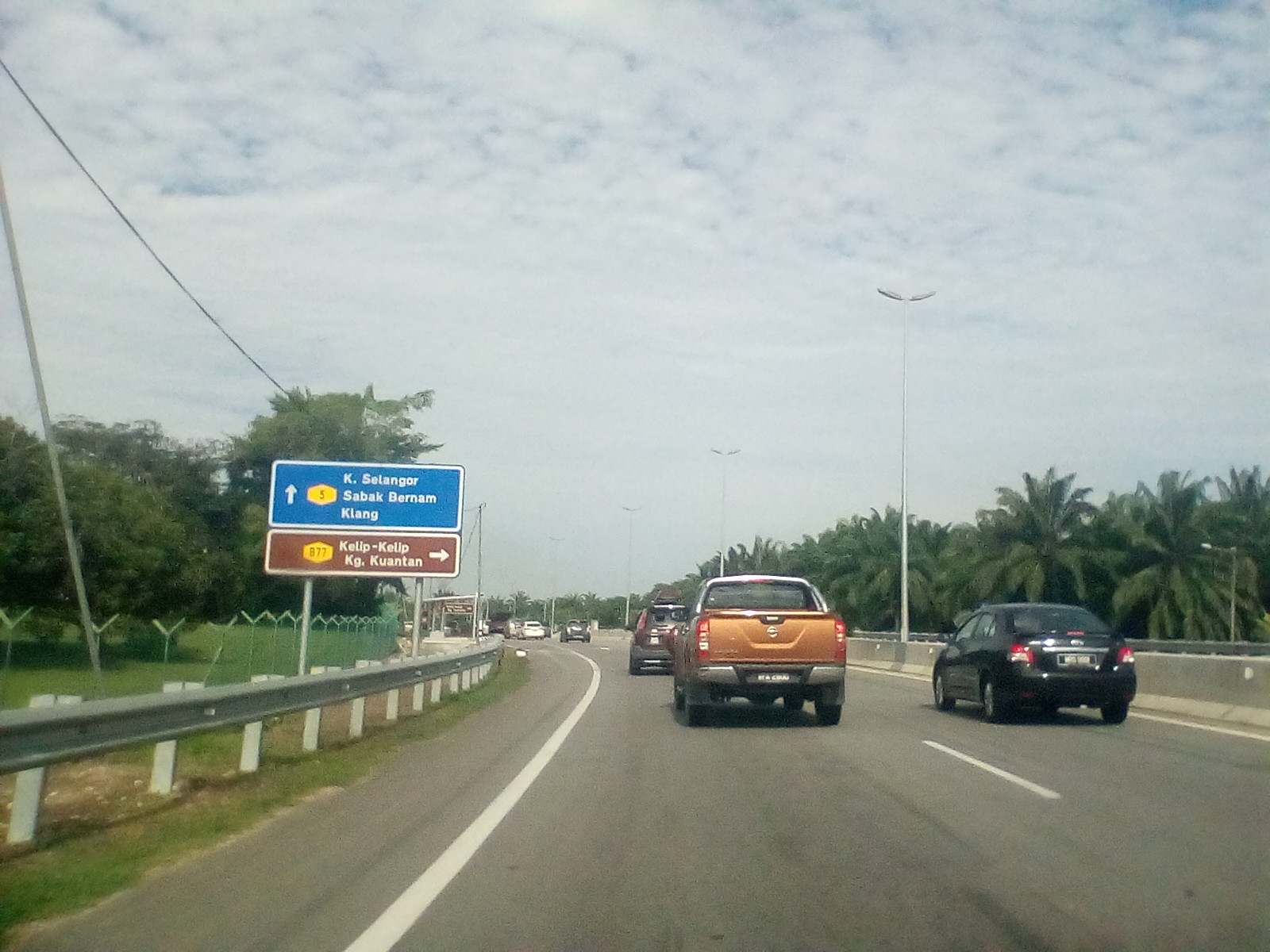
The intersection of Jalan Kampung Kuantan at Jalan Kuala Selangor

Selangor State Route B77, Jalan Kampung Kuantan or Jalan Kelab is a major road in Selangor, Malaysia.

In October 2022, a landslide occurred on the bridge near Jalan Kampung Kuantan, Batang Kali, due to heavy rains.

== Junction lists ==
The entire route is located in Kuala Selangor District, Selangor.

Legend:

- I/C - Interchange, I/S - Intersection, RSA - Rest and service area, OBR - Overhead bridge restaurant, R/R - Restaurant and rest plaza, L/B - Layby, V/P - Vista point, TN - tunnel, T/P - Toll plaza, BR - Bridge
- C - Cloverleaf, S - Stack, T-A - Trumpet-A, T-B - Trumpet-B, DT - Directional-T/Y, SDT - Semi-Directional-T/Y, P-Y - Partial-Y, D - Diamond, P-C - Partial cloverleaf, D-D - Diverging diamond, D-R - Direct ramp

Location	km	mi	Destinations	Notes
Kampung Kuantan			Kampung Kuantan Fireflies; B33 Selangor State Route B33 – Kuala Selangor, Bestari Jaya	T-junctions
Taman Ladang Kamasan				
Bukit Rotan			FT 54 Malaysia Federal Route 54 – Kuala Selangor, Tanjung Karang, Sabak Bernam, Klang, Ijok, Sungai Buloh, Kuala Lumpur; Taman Kasawari	Junctions
1.000 mi = 1.609 km; 1.000 km = 0.621 mi
