= Reman Malay =

Malay dialect of northwestern Malaysia

- Bahasa Melayu Reman بهاس ملايو رمان
- Cakak Ulu/Reman
- Native to: Malaysia
- Region: Kedah (Baling, Padang Terap, Sik, Yan), Perak (Hulu Perak District, Batu Kurau)
- Ethnicity: Reman Malays
- Language family: Austronesian: Malayo-Polynesian; (disputed); Malayic; Kelantan-Patani Malay; Reman Malay
- Dialects: Baling; Gerik; Batu Kurau

Language codes
- ISO 639-3: –

Reman Malay (cakak Reman/Ulu; Jawi: بهاس ملايو رمان; Malay: bahasa Melayu Reman), also known by several names such as Patani, Baling, Grik, and Tukugho, is a Malayic language spoken in the states of Kedah and Perak in northern Peninsular Malaysia. In the state of Kedah it is spoken in the districts of Baling, Padang Terap, Sik, and Yan, while in Perak it is spoken in Hulu Perak, but also in some areas within Kerian and Larut, Matang and Selama districts, especially in the towns of Batu Kurau and Bukit Gantang. Despite being located within these two states, Reman Malay is not closely related to neighbouring Kedahan and Perakian varieties but instead more closely related or an offshoot of Kelantan–Pattani Malay.

== History and etymology ==
The name Reman comes from the Malay kingdom of Reman, a semi-independent kingdom which is part of the Greater Patani Confederation. Reman existed from the early 19th century until it was dissolved in 1902. This kingdom once ruled what is now northern Perak (Hulu Perak) as well as southern Yala (now part of Thailand). After the 1909 Treaty, the kingdom was divided into two parts, with the north becoming part of Siam while the south became part of Perak. This divided the Reman Malay community. The name Reman is still used today as a name of a district in Yala province. Continuous conflicts between Siam and Patani in the 18th and 19th century led to many Patani Malays (including those from Reman) migrating westwards, into the state of Kedah. They became a majority in several districts of the state and mixing with Kedahan and Perakian locals, forming the modern Baling and Gerik dialects.

== Variants ==
Despite its small geographical and population size, Reman Malay exhibits high dialectal varieties which differs not only between states and districts but also between towns and villages as well. There is no agreement as to how many varieties of Reman are there but they were usually classified based on geographical division that is Baling, Grik or Hulu Perak and Batu Kurau. Each of these varieties have their own unique vocabulary and phonology but are still closely related to each other. Due to its isolation and smaller number of speakers, it is not intelligible to Kedahan and Perakian speakers as well as speakers of Standard Malay language.

== Comparison ==
Below are some of the comparisons between variants of Reman Malay as well as other Malayic languages and dialects in Peninsular Malaysia.

Standard Malay	Reman (Gerik/Hulu Perak)	Reman (Baling)	Kelantan-Pattani	Terengganu	Pahang	Kedah	Perak	Gloss
Pergi	Gi	Gi	Gi	Gi	Gi	Pi	Pegi, Gi	Went
Mereka	Demã	Demã	Demo	Deme	Deme	Depā, Lepā	Deme	They
Kamu	Mikã	Mohã, Humã	Mung	Mung	Aok	Hampā, Hang	Mike, Kome	You
Kami	Khumã	Khumã	Kami, Kito	Kaming, Kite	Kome	Sepā	Keme	We
Tidak Mahu	Tak Moh	Tak Mboh	Tok Sey	Tak Mboh	Tak Mboh	Tak Mau	Tak Sio	Do Not Want
Faham	Paha	Paha	Pehe	Pahang	Paha	Paham	Paham	Understand
Sangat Manis	Manih Letting	Manih Letting	Manih Letting	Manih Letting	Manih Meletiang	Manih Melecaih	Manih Meletin	Very Sweet (taste)
