= Ibrahim Hussein (artist) =

Malaysian artist

- Born: Ibrahim Hussein; 13 March 1936; Sungai Limau, Yan, Kedah, Malaysia
- Died: 19 February 2009 (aged 72); Kuala Lumpur, Malaysia
- Resting place: Bukit Kiara Muslim Cemetery, Kuala Lumpur

Datuk Ibrahim Hussein (13 March 1936 – 19 February 2009) was a Malaysian artist. His main medium was one he devised himself and called "printage"—a combination of printing and collage.

Ibrahim was born in 1936 in the village of Sungai Limau in the Yan district of Kedah. His eldest brother is Abdullah Hussain. A talented artist during his youth, he began studies at the Nanyang Academy of Fine Arts in Singapore in 1956. In 1959, he moved to London, where he studied at the Byam Shaw School of Art and the Royal Academy Schools. During his time in London, he worked as a postman and film extra to survive financially, until he was awarded an Award of Merit scholarship which allowed him to travel to France and Italy.

He returned to Malaysia to become a resident artist at the University of Malaya. In 1991, he founded the Ibrahim Hussein Museum and Cultural Foundation in the Langkawi rainforest—a non-profit foundation and museum dedicated to the promotion, development and advancement of art and culture.

Ibrahim suffered a heart attack on 18 February 2009 and was taken to the Pantai Medical Centre where he died the next morning just before 4.00 am.
