= Pahang State Route C106 =

Road in Malaysia

Pahang Route 106
- Jalan Belimbing–Pahang Tua

Major junctions
- West end: Belimbing
- C19 Jalan Belimbing; FT 12 Tun Razak Highway; C103 Jalan Langgar
- East end: Pahang Tua

Location
- Country: Malaysia
- Primary destinations: Paluh Hinai, Permatang Lanjut

Highway system
- Highways in Malaysia; Expressways; Federal; State

Jalan Belimbing–Pahang Tua (Pahang State Route C106) is a major road in Pahang, Malaysia.

== Features ==
FT12 Tun Razak Highway (1.1 km) overlaps with Jalan Belimbing–Pahang Tua. No alternate routes or motorcycle lanes are available.

== Junction lists ==
The entire route is located in Pekan District, Pahang.

Legend:

- I/C - Interchange, I/S - Intersection, RSA - Rest and service area, OBR - Overhead bridge restaurant, R/R - Restaurant and rest plaza, L/B - Layby, V/P - Vista point, TN - tunnel, T/P - Toll plaza, BR - Bridge

Location	km	Name	Destinations	Notes
Belimbing		Belimbing	C19 Jalan Belimbing – Maran, Gambang, Kuantan, Belimbing town centre, Lubuk Paku East Coast Expressway / AH141 – Kuala Lumpur, Kuala Terengganu	T-junctions
Belimbing		Kampung Koran		
Belimbing		Kampung Kincir		
Belimbing		Kampung Sinwah		
Belimbing		Kampung Wah		
Belimbing		Kampung Ubah		
Paluh Hinai		Kampung Sijar		
Paluh Hinai		Kampung Batu Ampar		
Paluh Hinai		Kampung Tanjung Cempaka		
Paluh Hinai		Kampung Pelak		
Paluh Hinai		Kampung Bunut		
Paluh Hinai		Kampung Kuala Lepar		
Paluh Hinai		Paluh Hinai	FT 12 / AH142 Tun Razak Highway – Gambang, Kuantan, Pekan, Bandar Muadzam Shah, Bandar Tun Abdul Razak, Segamat East Coast Expressway / AH141 – Kuala Lumpur, Kuala Terengganu	Junctions
Paluh Hinai		Permatang Lanjut		
Pahang Tua		Kampung Ganchong Ulu		
Pahang Tua		Kampung Ganchong Tengah		
Pahang Tua		Kampung Kiambang		
Pahang Tua		Kampung Tanjung Batu		
Pahang Tua		Kampung Pulau Rusa		
Pahang Tua		Kampung Teluk		
Pahang Tua		Pahang Tua	C103 Jalan Langgar – Kuantan, Pekan	T-junctions
1.000 mi = 1.609 km; 1.000 km = 0.621 mi: Concurrency terminus
