= Kedah State Route K165 =

Road in Malaysia

Kedah Route 165

Route information
- Length: 4 km (2.5 mi)

Major junctions
- South end: Merbok, Kedah
- K1 State Route K1
- North end: Tupah Recreation Area

Location
- Country: Malaysia
- Major cities: Merbok

Highway system
- Highways in Malaysia; Expressways; Federal; State

Kedah State Route K165, Jalan Rekreasi Tupah is major road to Rekreasi Tupah in the Kedah, Malaysia. It connects Jalan Pantai Barat Kedah to Rekreasi Tupah Recreation Park with a length of 4 km.

== Junction lists ==
The entire route is located in Kuala Muda District, Kedah.

Legend:

- I/C - Interchange, I/S - Intersection, RSA - Rest and service area, OBR - Overhead bridge restaurant, R/R - Restaurant and rest plaza, L/B - Layby, V/P - Vista point, TN - tunnel, T/P - Toll plaza, BR - Bridge
- C - Cloverleaf, S - Stack, T-A - Trumpet-A, T-B - Trumpet-B, DT - Directional-T/Y, SDT - Semi-Directional-T/Y, P-Y - Partial-Y, D - Diamond, P-C - Partial cloverleaf, D-D - Diverging diamond, D-R - Direct ramp

Location	km	mi	Name	Destinations	Notes
Merbok	0.0	0.0	Loji Air Tupah	Loji Air Tupah	
Merbok			Tupah Recreation Area		
Merbok			Sungai Bujang Bridge		
Merbok	4.0	2.5	Kedah State Route K1	K1 Kedah State Route K1 – Merbok, Singkir, Tanjung Dawai, Yan, Kuala Kedah, Semeling, Bedong, Gurun, Sungai Petani, Alor Setar	T-junctions
1.000 mi = 1.609 km; 1.000 km = 0.621 mi
