= Malaysia Federal Route 89 =

Road in Malaysia

Federal Route 89
- Jalan Tanjung Belungkor

Route information
- Maintained by Malaysian Public Works Department
- Length: 16.93 km (10.52 mi)

Major junctions
- East end: Pengerang Highway
- FT 92 Federal Route 92; J221 State Route J221; J225 State Route J225
- West end: Tanjung Belungkor

Location
- Country: Malaysia
- Primary destinations: Pasir Gogok, Tanjung Belungkor Ferry Terminal, Changi (Singapore)

Highway system
- Highways in Malaysia; Expressways; Federal; State

Federal Route 89, or Jalan Tanjung Belungkor, is a federal road in Johor, Malaysia.

== Route background ==
The Kilometre Zero of the Federal Route 89 starts at Tanjung Belungkor.

== Features ==
At most sections, the Federal Route 89 was built under the JKR R5 road standard, allowing maximum speed limit of up to 90 km/h.

== Junction lists ==
The entire route is located in Kota Tinggi District, Johor.

Legend:

- I/C - Interchange, I/S - Intersection, RSA - Rest and service area, OBR - Overhead bridge restaurant, R/R - Restaurant and rest plaza, L/B - Layby, V/P - Vista point, TN - tunnel, T/P - Toll plaza, BR - Bridge
- C - Cloverleaf, S - Stack, T-A - Trumpet-A, T-B - Trumpet-B, DT - Directional-T/Y, SDT - Semi-Directional-T/Y, P-Y - Partial-Y, D - Diamond, P-C - Partial cloverleaf, D-D - Diverging diamond, D-R - Direct ramp

Location	km	mi	Exit	Name	Destinations	Notes
Tanjung Belungkor	16.9	10.5		Pengerang Highway	FT 92 Malaysia Federal Route 92 – Kota Tinggi, Mersing, Bandar Penawar, Desaru, Sungai Rengit, Pengerang, Tanjung Pengelih; Senai–Desaru Expressway – Senai, Senai International Airport, Kuala Lumpur, Singapore, Ulu Tiram, Johor Bahru, Pasir Gudang	T-junctions
Tanjung Belungkor			8910	Lebam Estate		
Tanjung Belungkor				Santi Estate		
Tanjung Belungkor			8908	Pasir Gogok	J221 Johor State Route J221 – Pasir Gogok	T-junctions
Tanjung Belungkor			8905	Kampung Sungai Pachat		
Tanjung Belungkor				Kampung Baoh		
Tanjung Belungkor			8903	Kampung Belungkor		
Tanjung Belungkor			8901	Jalan Terminal Feri	J225 Johor State Route J225 – Tanjung Belungkor Ferry Terminal, FerryLink Tanjung Belungkor–Singapore, Ferry to Changi (Singapore)	T-junction
Tanjung Belungkor	0.0	0.0		Tanjung Belungkor		
1.000 mi = 1.609 km; 1.000 km = 0.621 mi
