= Perak State Route A5 =

Road in Perak, Malaysia

Perak Route 5
- Jalan Ulu Sepetang–Redang Panjang; Jalan Batu Kurau

Route information
- Maintained by Malaysian Public Works Department
- Length: 29.0 km (18.0 mi)

Major junctions
- North end: Sungai Terbuang
- A21 State Route A21; A113 State Route A113; A137 State Route A137; A209 State Route A209; A206 State Route A206; State Route A7
- South end: Ulu Sepetang

Location
- Country: Malaysia
- Primary destinations: Batu Kurau, Kamunting, Taiping, Kubu Gajah, Selama, Pondok Tanjung

Highway system
- Highways in Malaysia; Expressways; Federal; State

Perak State Route A5, Jalan Ulu Sepetang–Redang Panjang or Jalan Batu Kurau is a major road in Perak, Malaysia.

== Route background ==
The Kilometre Zero of the State Route A5 starts at Ulu Sepetang.

== Features ==
There are no alternate routes, overlaps or section with motorcycle lane.

== Junction lists ==
The entire route is located in Larut, Matang and Selama District, Perak.

Legend:

- I/C - Interchange, I/S - Intersection, RSA - Rest and service area, OBR - Overhead bridge restaurant, R/R - Restaurant and rest plaza, L/B - Layby, V/P - Vista point, TN - tunnel, T/P - Toll plaza, BR - Bridge
- C - Cloverleaf, S - Stack, T-A - Trumpet-A, T-B - Trumpet-B, DT - Directional-T/Y, SDT - Semi-Directional-T/Y, P-Y - Partial-Y, D - Diamond, P-C - Partial cloverleaf, D-D - Diverging diamond, D-R - Direct ramp

| Location | km | mi | Name | Destinations | Notes |
|---|---|---|---|---|---|
| Redang Panjang | 29.0 | 18.0 | Redang Panjang | A21 Perak State Route A21 – Selama, Bagan Serai, Redang Panjang, Gerik | |
| Batu Kurau | | | Pondok Tanjung Forest Reserve | | |
| Batu Kurau | | | Kelian Besar | | |
| Batu Kurau | | | Kampung Kurnia Batu 12 | | |
| Batu Kurau | | | Kampung Tok Gagap | | |
| Batu Kurau | | | Kampung Sungai Terbuang | A113 Perak State Route A113 – Kampung Seputeh, Gerik | |
| Batu Kurau | | | Ara River bridge | | |
| Batu Kurau | | | Kampung Batu 19 | | |
| Batu Kurau | | | Jelai | A209 Perak State Route A209 – Kampung Relang | |
| Batu Kurau | | | Jelai | A206 Perak State Route A206 – Kampung Ayer Hitam | |
| Batu Kurau | | | Kampung Melayu Batu 16 | | |
| Batu Kurau | | | Kampung Melayu Relau Berdiri | | |
| Batu Kurau | | | Kampung Batu Bertindan | | |
| Batu Kurau | | | Batu Kurau | A137 Perak State Route A137 | |
| Batu Kurau | | | Kampung Sungai Akar | | |
| Batu Kurau | | | Kampung Bukit | | |
| Batu Kurau | | | Kurau River bridge | | |
| Batu Kurau | | | Sungai Air Kuning | | |
| Kamunting | | | Sungai Sepetang | | |
| Kamunting | 0.0 | 0.0 | Kampung Ulu Sepetang | Perak State Route A7 – Taiping, Kubu Gajah, Selama, Pondok Tanjung; North–South Expressway Northern Route / AH2 – Bukit Kayu Hitam, Alor Setar, Penang, Kuala Kangsar, Ipoh, Kuala Lumpur | |
1.000 mi = 1.609 km; 1.000 km = 0.621 mi
