= Sungai Limau =

Coordinates: 5°54′N 100°23′E

Sungai Limau is a small town in Yan District, Kedah, Malaysia. It is the birthplace of the late Ibrahim Hussein, an eminent modern artist in Malaysia.
