= Selangor State Route B125 =

Selangor Route 125
- Jalan Sultan Suleiman Shah

Route information
- Length: 2.60 km (1.62 mi)

Major junctions
- North end: Kampung Sungai Buaya
- B124 State Route B124; Jalan Pak Kobat; B58 State Route B58
- South end: Jugra

Location
- Country: Malaysia

Highway system
- Highways in Malaysia; Expressways; Federal; State

State Route B125, Jalan Sultan Suleiman Shah or Jalan Kampung Bandar, is a major road in Selangor, Malaysia. It was named after Sultan Alaeddin Sulaiman Shah, the fifth Sultan of Selangor reigning from 1898 to 1938.

== Route description ==
The Jalan Sultan Suleiman Shah B125 intersects with the Jalan Sungai Buaya B124 at Kampung Sungai Buaya. Jalan Pak Kobat connecting with State Route B125, and it's the only one intersections along the B125. The Jalan Sultan Suleiman Shah B125 intersects with the Dual carriageway road Jalan Sultan Abdul Samad (State Route B58) at Jugra.

== Junction lists ==
The entire route is located in Kuala Langat District, Selangor.

Location	km	mi	Name	Destinations	Notes
Sungai Buaya			Kampung Sungai Buaya	B124 Selangor State Route B124 – Kampung Ayer Tawar, Old Palace, Kampung Sungai Buaya, Telok Panglima Garang, Sijangkang	
Jugra			Jalan Pak Kobat	Jalan Pak Kobat	
Jugra			SMS Banting	Sekolah Menengah Sains Banting	
Jugra			Kuala Langat Community Collage	Kuala Langat Community Collage	
Jugra			Jugra	B58 Selangor State Route B58 – Jugra, Kathong, Sungai Raba, Banting, Morib; South Klang Valley Expressway – Port Klang, Pulau Indah, Putrajaya, Cyberjaya, Kajang, Kuala Lumpur International Airport	
1.000 mi = 1.609 km; 1.000 km = 0.621 mi
