= Perak State Route A132 =

Road in Perak, Malaysia

Perak Route 132
- Jalan Paku

Major junctions
- South end: Bidor
- A131 Jalan Kampung Poh
- North end: Kampung Chabang Baharu

Location
- Country: Malaysia
- Primary destinations: Taman Bukit Bidor, Taman Daya, Kampung Senta

Highway system
- Highways in Malaysia; Expressways; Federal; State

Perak State Route A132 (Jalan Paku) is a major road in Perak, Malaysia.

== Junction lists ==
The entire route is located in Batang Padang District, Perak.

Legend:

- I/C - Interchange, I/S - Intersection, RSA - Rest and service area, OBR - Overhead bridge restaurant, R/R - Restaurant and rest plaza, L/B - Layby, V/P - Vista point, TN - tunnel, T/P - Toll plaza, BR - Bridge
- C - Cloverleaf, S - Stack, T-A - Trumpet-A, T-B - Trumpet-B, DT - Directional-T/Y, SDT - Semi-Directional-T/Y, P-Y - Partial-Y, D - Diamond, P-C - Partial cloverleaf, D-D - Diverging diamond, D-R - Direct ramp

Location	km	mi	Name	Destinations	Notes
Bidor			Bidor	A131 Jalan Kampung Poh – Bidor, Tapah, Sungkai, Kampung Poh, Ipoh, Kuala Lumpur; North–South Expressway Northern Route / AH2 – Ipoh, Kuala Lumpur	T-junctions
Bidor			Taman Daya	Taman Daya	T-junctions
Bidor			Taman Bukit Bidor	Taman Bukit Bidor	T-junctions
Bidor			Kampung Senta	Kampung Senta	T-junctions
Bidor			Kampung Chabang Baharu		
Bidor			Gepai Fall	Gepai Falls (Lubuk Degung)	End of Road
1.000 mi = 1.609 km; 1.000 km = 0.621 mi
