= Johor State Route J52 =

Road in Malaysia

Johor Route 52

Major junctions
- East end: Sungai Rengit
- FT 92 Federal Route 92; FT 90 Federal Route 90
- West end: Tanjung Pengelih

Location
- Country: Malaysia
- Primary destinations: Pengerang

Highway system
- Highways in Malaysia; Expressways; Federal; State

Jalan Tanjung Pengelih (Johor state route J52) is a major road in Johor, Malaysia.

== Junction lists ==
The entire route is located in Kota Tinggi District, Johor.

Legend:

- I/C - Interchange, I/S - Intersection, RSA - Rest and service area, OBR - Overhead bridge restaurant, R/R - Restaurant and rest plaza, L/B - Layby, V/P - Vista point, TN - tunnel, T/P - Toll plaza, BR - Bridge
- C - Cloverleaf, S - Stack, T-A - Trumpet-A, T-B - Trumpet-B, DT - Directional-T/Y, SDT - Semi-Directional-T/Y, P-Y - Partial-Y, D - Diamond, P-C - Partial cloverleaf, D-D - Diverging diamond, D-R - Direct ramp

Location	km	mi	Name	Destinations	Notes
Sungai Rengit			Pengerang Highway	FT 92 Malaysia Federal Route 92 – Kota Tinggi, Mersing, Bandar Penawar, Desaru; Senai–Desaru Expressway – Senai, Senai International Airport, Kulai, Singapore, Johor Bahru, Pasir Gudang, Kuala Lumpur; FT 90 Malaysia Federal Route 90 – Teluk Ramunia, Pengerang New Settlement	T-junctions
Sungai Rengit			Sungai Rengit		
Pengerang			Sungai Kapal Bridge		
Pengerang			Kampung Batu Buloh	Kampung Batu Buloh	T-junctions
Pengerang			Tanjung Tembuan		
Pengerang			Kampung Sungai Buntu		
Pengerang			Tanjung Dato		
Pengerang			Batu Ayam	Taman Rengit Jaya	T-junctions
Pengerang			Pengerang Integrated Petroleum Complex (RAPID)	Pengerang Integrated Petroleum Complex (RAPID) – Independent Deepwater Petroleum Terminal	Roundabout
Pengerang			Kampung Merak		
Pengerang			Pengerang		
Pengerang			Kampung Baharu		
Pengerang			PULAREK (KD Sultan Ismail)	Royal Malaysian Naval Academy (PULAREK) – KD Sultan Ismail	T-junctions
Pengerang			Pusat Serenti Pengerang	Pusat Serenti Pengerang	T-junctions
Tanjung Pengelih			Tanjung Pengelih	British Military Operation Centre Fortress	Historical site
1.000 mi = 1.609 km; 1.000 km = 0.621 mi
