= Kampung Kuantan =

Coordinates: 3°28′N 101°41′E

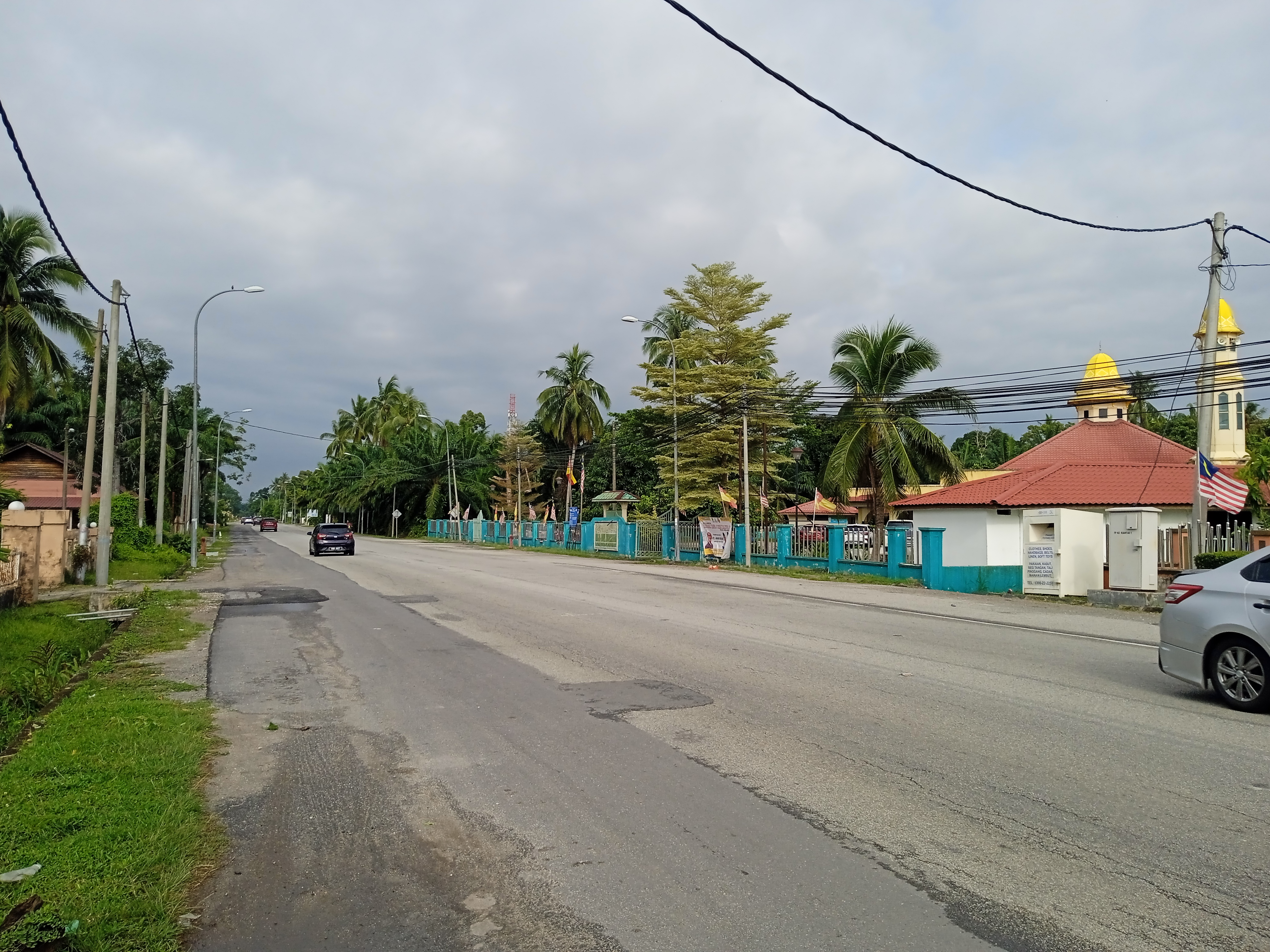
Kampung Kuantan

Kampung Kuantan is a small village in Kuala Selangor, Selangor, Malaysia. It is located about 7 kilometres (4.34 miles) from Kuala Selangor town. One of the most famous attractions here is Kuala Selangor Fireflies, a rare natural phenomenon.
