= Johor State Route J225 =

Road in Malaysia

Johor Route 225

Major junctions
- North end: Tanjung Belungkor
- FT 89 Jalan Tanjung Belungkor
- South end: Tanjung Belungkor Ferry Terminal

Location
- Country: Malaysia

Highway system
- Highways in Malaysia; Expressways; Federal; State

Jalan Terminal Feri, Johor State Route J225 is a major road in Johor, Malaysia.

== Junction lists ==
The entire route is located in Kota Tinggi District, Johor.

Legend:

- I/C - Interchange, I/S - Intersection, RSA - Rest and service area, OBR - Overhead bridge restaurant, R/R - Restaurant and rest plaza, L/B - Layby, V/P - Vista point, TN - tunnel, T/P - Toll plaza, BR - Bridge
- C - Cloverleaf, S - Stack, T-A - Trumpet-A, T-B - Trumpet-B, DT - Directional-T/Y, SDT - Semi-Directional-T/Y, P-Y - Partial-Y, D - Diamond, P-C - Partial cloverleaf, D-D - Diverging diamond, D-R - Direct ramp

Km	Exit	Name	Destinations	Notes
		Tanjung Belungkor	FT 89 Malaysia Federal Route 89 – Tanjung Belungkor, Pengerang, Kota Tinggi, Johor Bahru	T-junction
		J-Links Jetty		
		Tanjung Belungkor Ferry Terminal	Tanjung Belungkor Ferry Terminal – FerryLink Tanjung Belungkor-Singapore (Ferry to Changi (Singapore))	
