= Perak State Route A187 =

Road in Malaysia

Perak Route 187
- Jalan Pekan Sungkai

Major junctions
- North end: FT 1 Jalan Bidor
- FT 1 Federal Route 1 A189 Jalan Changkat Sulaiman
- South end: FT 1 Jalan Trolak

Location
- Country: Malaysia
- Primary destinations: Sungkai

Highway system
- Highways in Malaysia; Expressways; Federal; State

Jalan Pekan Sungkai (Perak state route A187) is a major road in Perak, Malaysia.

== List of junctions ==
Km	Exit	Junctions	To	Remarks
		Jalan Bidor	North; FT 1 Ipoh; FT 1 Bidor South; FT 1 Slim River; FT 1 Trolak; North–South Expressway Northern Route AH2 North–South Expressway Northern Route; Bukit Kayu Hitam; Penang; Kuala Lumpur	T-junctions
		Jalan Changkat Sulaiman	Southwest; A189 Jalan Changkat Sulaiman; Changkat Sulaiman; FELDA Besout	T-junctions
		Sungkai Police Station		
		Sungkai		
		Sekolah Menengah Kebangsaan Sungkai		
		Jalan Trolak	North; FT 1 Ipoh; FT 1 Bidor; North–South Expressway Northern Route AH2 North–South Expressway Northern Route; Bukit Kayu Hitam; Penang; Kuala Lumpur South; FT 1 Slim River; FT 1 Trolak	T-junctions
