= Selangor State Route B58 =

Road in Malaysia

Selangor Route 58
- Jalan Sultan Abdul Samad

Route information
- Length: 5.60 km (3.48 mi)

Major junctions
- West end: Kathong
- B59 Jalan Kelanang; B125 State Route B125; B124 Jalan Serdang Belah; FT 5 Klang–Banting Highway; FT 5 Federal Route 5
- East end: Banting

Location
- Country: Malaysia

Highway system
- Highways in Malaysia; Expressways; Federal; State

Selangor State Route B58 is a major road in Selangor, Malaysia. It was named after Sultan Abdul Samad of Selangor who ruled Jugra until his death on 1898. It is a main route to Bandar Jugra, a former capital of Selangor.

== Features ==
- Dual carriageway road

== Junction lists ==
The entire route is located in Kuala Langat District, Selangor.

Legend:

- I/C - Interchange, I/S - Intersection, RSA - Rest and service area, OBR - Overhead bridge restaurant, R/R - Restaurant and rest plaza, L/B - Layby, V/P - Vista point, TN - tunnel, T/P - Toll plaza, BR - Bridge
- C - Cloverleaf, S - Stack, T-A - Trumpet-A, T-B - Trumpet-B, DT - Directional-T/Y, SDT - Semi-Directional-T/Y, P-Y - Partial-Y, D - Diamond, P-C - Partial cloverleaf, D-D - Diverging diamond, D-R - Direct ramp

Location	km	mi	Name	Destinations	Notes
Jugra	0.0	0.0	Kathong	B59 Jalan Kelanang – Permatang Pasir, Jugra Lama, Selangor Matriculation College, Sultan Abdul Samad Mausoleum, Kelanang, Morib, Sepang, Port Dickson	
Jugra			Sungai Kathong bridge		
Jugra			Taman Jugra Jaya	B125 Selangor State Route B125 – Bandar Jugra, Istana Bandar, Alaeddin Mosque	
Jugra			TUDM Jugra		
Banting	1.0	0.62	Taman Banting Baru	Persiaran Banting Utama – Taman Banting Baru	
Banting			Politeknik Banting	Persiaran Ilmu – Banting Politechnic	
Banting			ILP Kuala Langat	Kuala Langat Industrial Training Institute	
Banting			IKBN Kuala Langat	IKBN Kuala Langat	
Banting			Jalan Serdang Belah	B124 Jalan Serdang Belah – Kampung Sungai Buaya, Teluk Panglima Garang, Carey Island	
Banting			Al-Taqwa	Al-Taqwa Mosque (Bandar Banting Mosque)	
Banting	5.6	3.5	Banting	FT 5 Klang–Banting Highway – Klang, Shah Alam, Kuala Lumpur, Teluk Panglima Garang, Dengkil, Kuala Lumpur International Airport (KLIA); FT 5 Malaysia Federal Route 5 – Morib, Sepang, Port Dickson	
1.000 mi = 1.609 km; 1.000 km = 0.621 mi
