= Pahang State Route C103 =

Road in Malaysia

Pahang Route 103
- Jalan Langgar

Major junctions
- North end: Jalan Kuantan–Pekan
- FT 3 / AH18 Federal Route 3 C106 Jalan Belimbing–Pahang Tua
- Southeast end: Jalan Kuantan–Pekan

Location
- Country: Malaysia
- Primary destinations: Pahang Tua, Kampung Langgar

Highway system
- Highways in Malaysia; Expressways; Federal; State

Jalan Langgar also known as Jalan Pahang Tua (Pahang State Route C103) is a major road in Pahang, Malaysia.

== Junction lists ==
The entire route is located in Pekan District, Pahang.

Legend:

- I/C - Interchange, I/S - Intersection, RSA - Rest and service area, OBR - Overhead bridge restaurant, R/R - Restaurant and rest plaza, L/B - Layby, V/P - Vista point, TN - tunnel, T/P - Toll plaza, BR - Bridge
- C - Cloverleaf, S - Stack, T-A - Trumpet-A, T-B - Trumpet-B, DT - Directional-T/Y, SDT - Semi-Directional-T/Y, P-Y - Partial-Y, D - Diamond, P-C - Partial cloverleaf, D-D - Diverging diamond, D-R - Direct ramp

Location	km	mi	Name	Destinations	Notes
Pekan			Jalan Kuantan–Pekan	FT 3 / AH18 Malaysia Federal Route 3 – Kuala Terengganu, Kuantan, Pekan, Johor Bahru	T-junctions
Pekan			Kampung Lamir		
Pekan			Kampung Gembuang		
Pekan			Pahang Tua	C106 Jalan Belimbing–Pahang Tua – Belimbing, Lubuk Paku, Paluh Hinai	T-junctions
Pekan			Makam Sultan Muhammad Mansor Syah		
Pekan			Kampung Tanjung Langgar		
Pekan			Kampung Langgar		
Pekan			Kampung Benta		
Pekan			Kampung Jambu		
Pekan			Jalan Kuantan–Pekan	FT 3 / AH18 Malaysia Federal Route 3 – Kuala Terengganu, Kuantan, Pekan, Johor Bahru	T-junctions
1.000 mi = 1.609 km; 1.000 km = 0.621 mi
