= Johor State Route J221 =

Road in Malaysia

Johor Route 221

Major junctions
- North end: Tanjung Belungkor
- FT 89 Federal Route 89
- South end: Pasir Gogok

Location
- Country: Malaysia

Highway system
- Highways in Malaysia; Expressways; Federal; State

Johor State Route J221, Jalan Pasir Gogok is a major road in Johor, Malaysia.

== Junction lists ==
The entire route is located in Kota Tinggi District, Johor.

Legend:

- I/C - Interchange, I/S - Intersection, RSA - Rest and service area, OBR - Overhead bridge restaurant, R/R - Restaurant and rest plaza, L/B - Layby, V/P - Vista point, TN - tunnel, T/P - Toll plaza, BR - Bridge
- C - Cloverleaf, S - Stack, T-A - Trumpet-A, T-B - Trumpet-B, DT - Directional-T/Y, SDT - Semi-Directional-T/Y, P-Y - Partial-Y, D - Diamond, P-C - Partial cloverleaf, D-D - Diverging diamond, D-R - Direct ramp

Location	km	mi	Name	Destinations	Notes
Tanjung Belungkor			Tanjung Belungkor	FT 89 Malaysia Federal Route 89 – Tanjung Belungkor, Changi (Singapore) (Ferry), Pengerang, Kota Tinggi, Johor Bahru	T-junctions
Tanjung Belungkor			Santi Estate		
Pasir Gogok			Pasir Gogok	Jalan Bunga Cempaka 3 – Pasir Gogok Chinese Cemetery	T-junctions
Pasir Gogok			Pasir Gogok	Jalan Anggerik – SJK(C) Pasir Gogok	T-junctions
Pasir Gogok			Pasir Gogok	Jalan Bunga Raya – Sekolah Kebangsaan Pasir Gogok, Masjid Jamek Pasir Gogok, Pasir Gogok Police Post; Jalan Bunga Tanjung	T-junctions
1.000 mi = 1.609 km; 1.000 km = 0.621 mi
