= FELDA Besout =

Coordinates: 3.8362637°N 101.273045°E

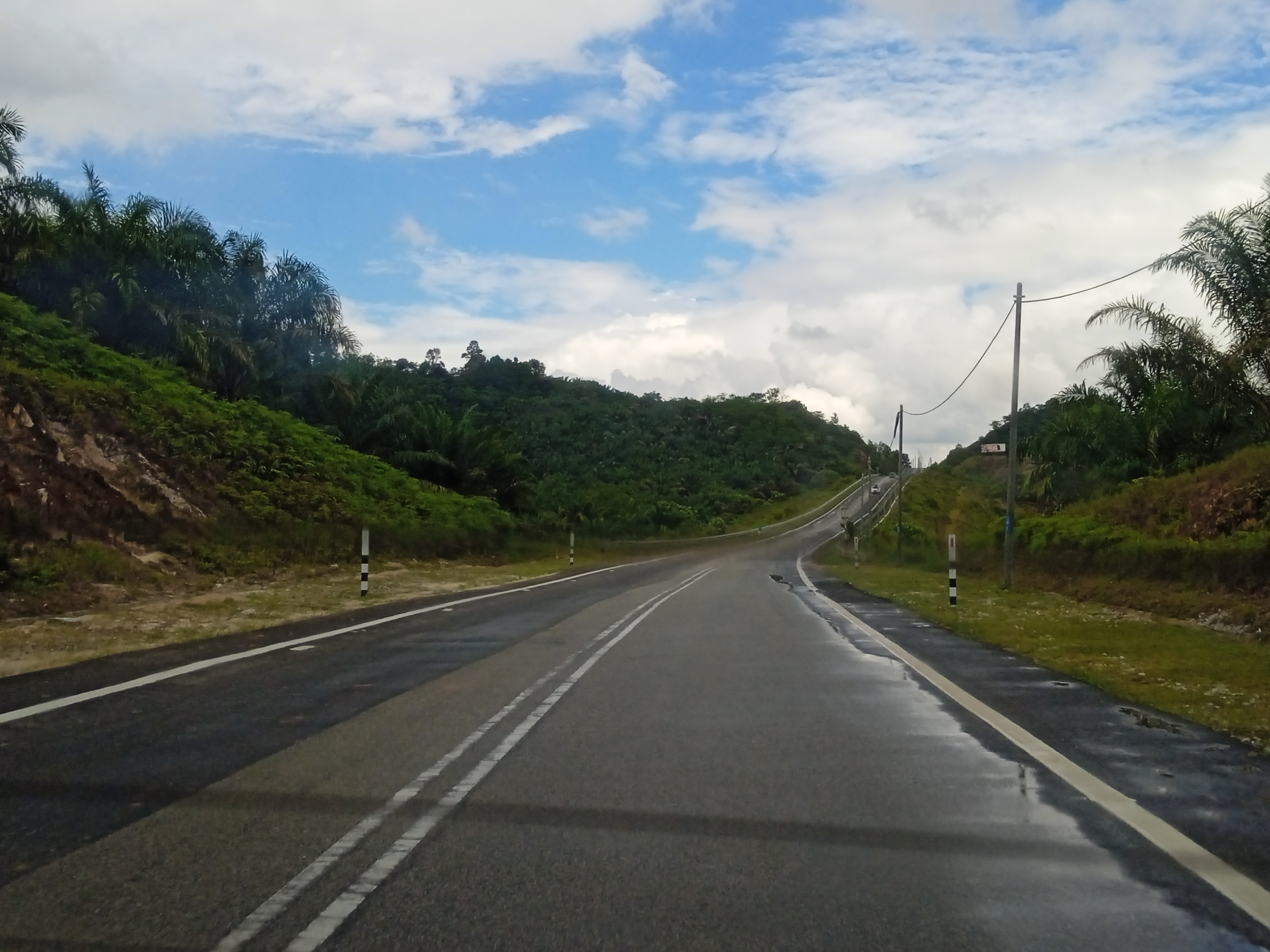
FELDA Besout

FELDA Besout is a settlement town in Perak, Malaysia. This FELDA settlement is located about 28 km from Sungkai town.

== List of settlements ==
- FELDA Besout 1
- FELDA Besout 2
- FELDA Besout 3
- FELDA Besout 4
- FELDA Besout 5
