= Kedah State Route K631 =

Road in Malaysia

Kedah Route 631

Route information
- Length: 2.1 km (1.3 mi)

Major junctions
- North end: Bujang Valley Archeology Museum
- K1 State Route K1
- South end: Merbok

Location
- Country: Malaysia
- Primary destinations: Merbok, Bujang Valley Archeology Museum

Highway system
- Highways in Malaysia; Expressways; Federal; State

Jalan Lembah Bujang (or Jalan Merbok—Merbok Temple), Kedah State Route K631, is a major road to Lembah Bujang Archeology Museum in Selangor, Malaysia. The 1.8-km section of this road connects Bedong, Kuala Muda, to Bujang Valley Archeology Museum.

== Junction lists ==
The entire route is located in Kuala Muda District, Kedah.

Legend:

- I/C - Interchange, I/S - Intersection, RSA - Rest and service area, OBR - Overhead bridge restaurant, R/R - Restaurant and rest plaza, L/B - Layby, V/P - Vista point, TN - tunnel, T/P - Toll plaza, BR - Bridge
- C - Cloverleaf, S - Stack, T-A - Trumpet-A, T-B - Trumpet-B, DT - Directional-T/Y, SDT - Semi-Directional-T/Y, P-Y - Partial-Y, D - Diamond, P-C - Partial cloverleaf, D-D - Diverging diamond, D-R - Direct ramp

| Location | km | mi | Name | Destinations | Notes |
|---|---|---|---|---|---|
| Merbok | | | Candi Bukit Batu Pahat | Candi Bukit Batu Pahat | Historical side |
| Merbok | | | Bujang Valley Archeology Museum | | |
| Merbok | | | Kem PLKN | Kem PLKN | |
| Merbok | | | Merbok | K1 Kedah State Route K1 – Singkir, Tanjung Dawai, Yan, Kuala Kedah, Merbok, Semeling, Bedong, Sungai Petani, Gurun; North–South Expressway Northern Route / AH2 – Bukit Kayu Hitam, Alor Setar, George Town, Ipoh, Kuala Lumpur | T-junctions |
1.000 mi = 1.609 km; 1.000 km = 0.621 mi
