= Kedah State Route K161 =

Road in Malaysia

Kedah Route 161

Route information
- Length: 4.5 km (2.8 mi)

Major junctions
- North end: Singkir, Kedah
- K1 State Route K1
- South end: Tanjung Dawai

Location
- Country: Malaysia
- Towns: Tanjung Dawai

Highway system
- Highways in Malaysia; Expressways; Federal; State

Jalan Tanjung Dawai (Kedah State Route 161) is a major road to Tanjung Dawai in Kedah, Malaysia. It connects Singkir to Tanjung Dawai.

== Junction lists ==
The entire route is located in Kuala Muda District, Kedah.

Legend:

- I/C - Interchange, I/S - Intersection, RSA - Rest and service area, OBR - Overhead bridge restaurant, R/R - Restaurant and rest plaza, L/B - Layby, V/P - Vista point, TN - tunnel, T/P - Toll plaza, BR - Bridge
- C - Cloverleaf, S - Stack, T-A - Trumpet-A, T-B - Trumpet-B, DT - Directional-T/Y, SDT - Semi-Directional-T/Y, P-Y - Partial-Y, D - Diamond, P-C - Partial cloverleaf, D-D - Diverging diamond, D-R - Direct ramp

Location	km	mi	Name	Destinations	Notes
Singkir			Singkir	K1 Jalan Pantai Barat Kedah – Tanjung Jaga, Yan, Alor Setar, Semeling, Bedong	T-junction
Singkir			Kampung Sungai Pial	K652 Jalan Sungai Pial – Kampung Sungai Pial	T-junction
Tanjung Dawai			Kampung Nelayan	K664 Jalan Kampung Nelayan – Kampung Nelayan	
Tanjung Dawai			Tanjung Dawai	Fisheries Development Authority of Malaysia (LKIM), Tanjung Dawai Police Station, Sekolah Kebangsaan Tanjung Dawai, Haji Zainudin Mosque	
1.000 mi = 1.609 km; 1.000 km = 0.621 mi
