= Lakis =

Lakis is a name. People with the name include:

- Vasilios Lakis
- Lauren Lakis
- Eid Lakis
- Lakis Lazopoulos
- Lakis Petropoulos
- Lakis Nikolaou
- Lakis Papaioannou
- Lakis Stergioudas
- Lakis Glezos
- Lakis Santas
- Lakis Pyrzas
