= Kedah State Route K132 =

Road in Malaysia

Kedah Route 132
- Jalan Tandop

Route information
- Length: 4.6 km (2.9 mi)

Major junctions
- West end: Alor Ibus
- K1 State Route K1; FT 1 Federal Route 1
- East end: Tandop

Location
- Country: Malaysia
- Towns: Tandop

Highway system
- Highways in Malaysia; Expressways; Federal; State

Jalan Tandop (Kedah State Route 132) is a major road in Kedah, Malaysia. It connects Jalan Pantai Barat Kedah to Tandop.

== Junction lists ==
The entire route is located in Kota Setar District, Kedah.

Legend:

- I/C - Interchange, I/S - Intersection, RSA - Rest and service area, OBR - Overhead bridge restaurant, R/R - Restaurant and rest plaza, L/B - Layby, V/P - Vista point, TN - tunnel, T/P - Toll plaza, BR - Bridge
- C - Cloverleaf, S - Stack, T-A - Trumpet-A, T-B - Trumpet-B, DT - Directional-T/Y, SDT - Semi-Directional-T/Y, P-Y - Partial-Y, D - Diamond, P-C - Partial cloverleaf, D-D - Diverging diamond, D-R - Direct ramp

Location	km	mi	Name	Destinations	Notes
Alor Ibus			Alor Ibus	K1 Kedah State Route K1 – Alor Ibus, Kuala Kedah, Kampung Kuala Kangkong, Yan, Tanjung Dawai, Bedong	T-junctions
Alor Ibus			Sungai Padang Terap bridge		
Tandop			Sridu	Sekolah Rendah Islam Darul Ulum (Sridu)	T-junctions
Tandop	0.0	0.0	Tandop	FT 1 Malaysia Federal Route 1 – Jitra, Kepala Batas, Kuala Kedah, Simpang Kuala, Alor Setar, Simpang Empat, Kota Sarang Semut, Gurun, Sungai Petani; North–South Expressway Northern Route / AH2 – Bukit Kayu Hitam, Alor Setar, Penang, Ipoh, Kuala Lumpur	T-junctions
1.000 mi = 1.609 km; 1.000 km = 0.621 mi
