= Perak State Route A189 =

Road in Malaysia

Perak Route 189
- Jalan Changkat Sulaiman
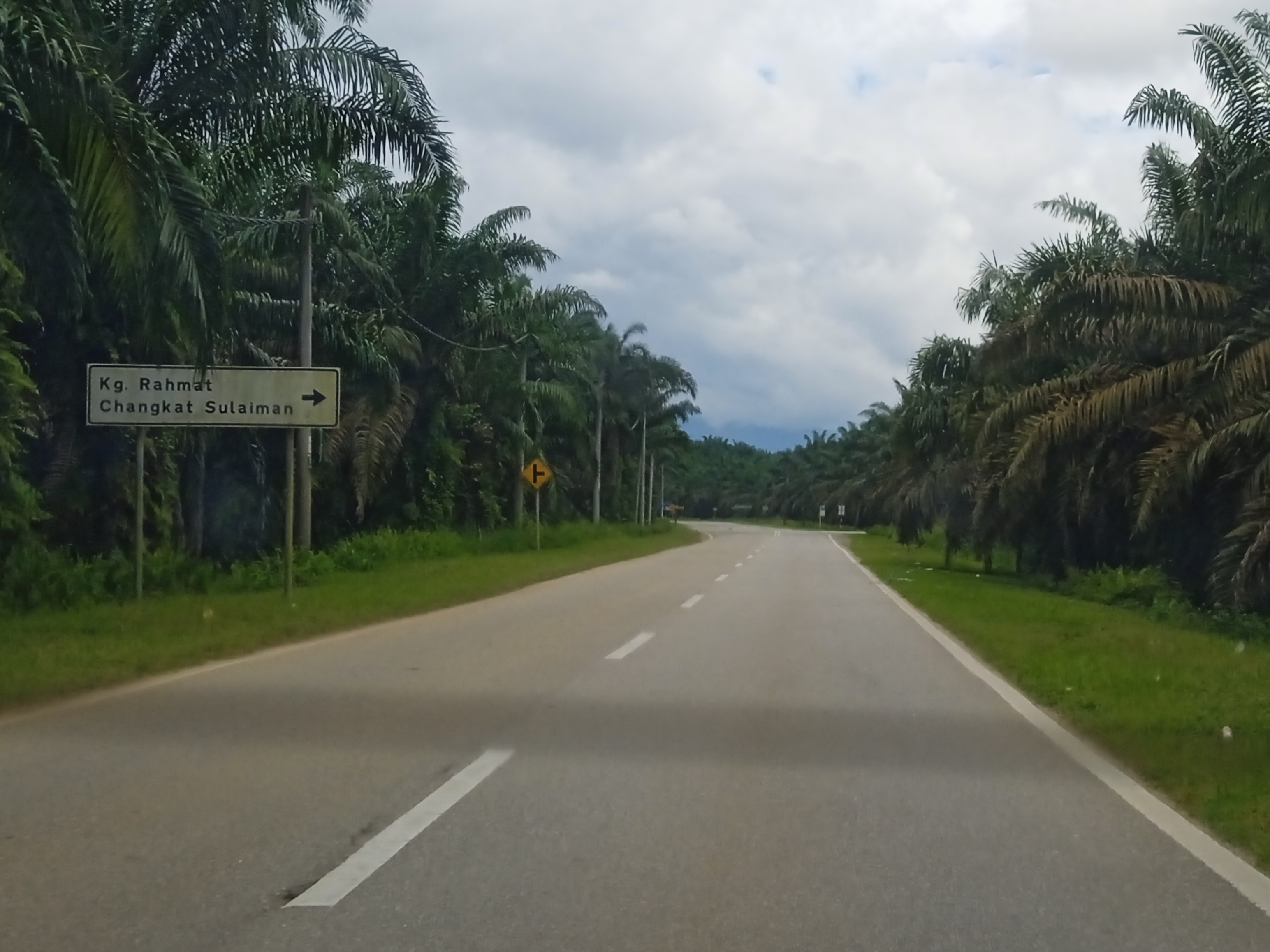

Major junctions
- North end: Sungkai
- A187 Jalan Pekan Sungkai; FT 1154 (1154) Jalan FELDA Besout
- South end: FT 1154 Jalan FELDA Besout

Location
- Country: Malaysia
- Primary destinations: Changkat Sulaiman

Highway system
- Highways in Malaysia; Expressways; Federal; State

Jalan Changkat Sulaiman (Perak state route A189) is a major road in Perak, Malaysia.

== List of junctions ==
Km	Exit	Junctions	To	Remarks
		Sungkai	A187 Jalan Pekan Sungkai; East; FT 1 Ipoh; FT 1 Bidor; North–South Expressway Northern Route AH2 North–South Expressway Northern Route; Bukit Kayu Hitam; Penang; Kuala Lumpur south Sungkai town	T-junctions
		Taman Lembah Jaya	Taman Lembah Jaya; Sungkai railway station	T-junctions
		Changkat Sulaiman		
		Sungai Sungkai bridge		
		Jalan FELDA Besout	FT 1154 (1154) Jalan FELDA Besout west FELDA Besout East; Trolak; Slim River; Kuala Lumpur	T-junctions
