= Pengerang Integrated Petroleum Complex =

Megaproject development in Pengerang, Malaysia

Coordinates: 1°22′1.4″N 104°10′9.9″E

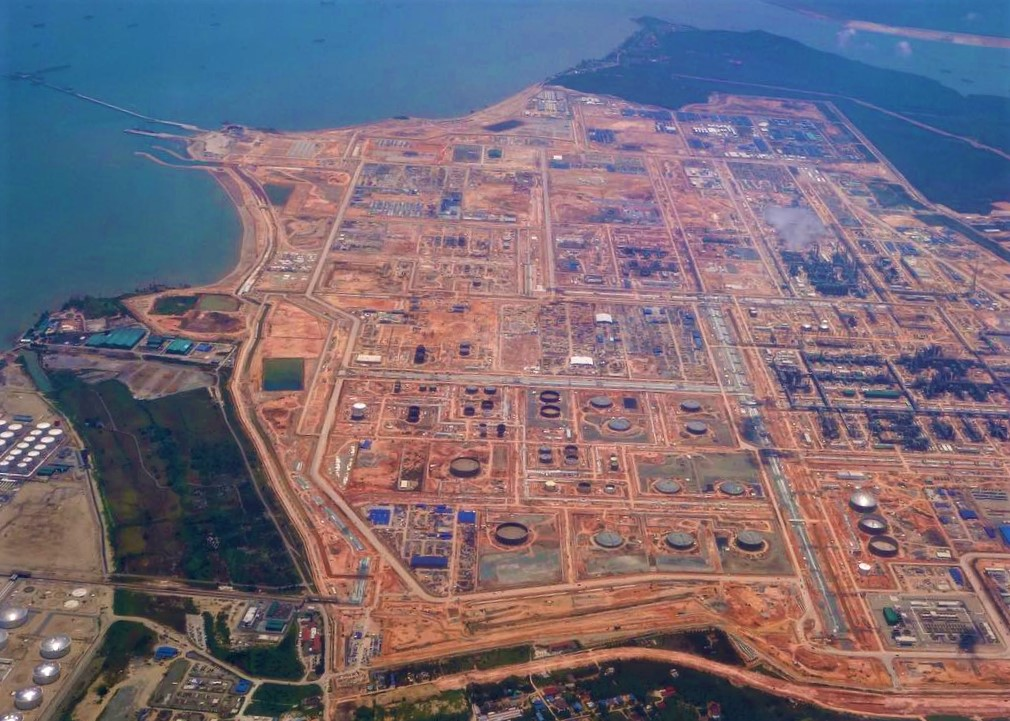
- Location: Pengerang, Kota Tinggi District, Johor, Malaysia
- Industry: Oil and gas
- Area: 80 km^{2} (31 sq mi)

Pengerang Integrated Petroleum Complex (PIPC) is a megaproject development in Pengerang, Kota Tinggi District, Johor, Malaysia. It spans over an area of 80 km^{2} and is currently the largest petrochemical complex in Malaysia, and one of the major petrochemical hubs in the world. It will house oil refineries, naphtha crackers, petrochemical plants, liquefied natural gas (LNG) terminals and a regasification plant upon completion.

== Background ==
The site where it stands now was chosen because of its location along major shipping routes between the Middle East and China. The project was launched to increase Malaysia's petrochemical output.

== Management ==
The Johor Petroleum Development Corporation Berhad (JPDC) was established to oversee the development of the project. JPDC was created as a subsidiary of Malaysia Petroleum Resources Corporation (MPRC).

== Architecture ==
The components of PIPC was first initiated with the development of the 5 million cubic meters capacity of Pengerang Deepwater Terminal (PDT), a joint-venture between Dialog Group, Royal Vopak of the Netherlands and Johor. It serves as a centralized storage facility for trading, refining and petrochemical industry. The USD3 billion facility includes an independent terminal for trading, a dedicated industrial terminal within PIPC, and an LNG terminal. The construction of a deepwater jetty facility enables the berthing of both ultra large crude carriers and very large crude carriers. PDT received its first shipment of oil in the first quarter of 2014.

The other component of PIPC is the Petronas Pengerang Integrated Complex (PIC), Petronas' largest downstream investment in a single location to date. The development includes the US$16 billion Refinery and Petrochemical Integrated Development Project (RAPID).

This also involves the US$11 billion associated facilities, which are air separation unit, raw water supply, cogeneration plant, regasification terminal, deepwater terminal and utilities. Upon its completion in 2019, PIC will have a refining capacity of 300,000 barrels per day with petrochemical plants yielding an estimated annual production capacity of 3.6 million tonnes of petrochemical products.

Its sheltered harbour with a natural water depth of 24 meters provides berthing conditions for Ultra Large Crude Carriers (ULCCs) and Very Large Crude Carriers (VLCCs).

== Transportation ==
The complex is accessible by road using the Senai–Desaru Expressway from Johor Bahru.
