= Batu Kurau =

Mukim in Larut, Matang and Selama, Perak, Malaysia

Batu Kurau Tukugho
- Mukim
- Location within Perak
- Coordinates: 4.9771°N 100.8001°E
- Country: Malaysia
- State: Perak
- District: Larut, Matang and Selama
- Elevation: 45 m (148 ft)

Batu Kurau in Larut, Matang and Selama District

Batu Kurau (Reman Malay: Tukugho; Jawi: باتو كوراو) is a small town and mukim located in Larut, Matang and Selama district in Perak, Malaysia. It is located 20 km from Taiping, Perak's second largest city.

== History ==
The town of Batu Kurau was founded somewhere in the 1850s by settlers from Patani. The first leader of the town by the name of Tok Amar Wan Kasa Bin Raja Hulubalang Patani became Penghulu in the year 1859 until 1867. The foundation of Batu Kurau coincided with the founding of nearby Taiping by Long Jaafar who was the officer of Larut district at the time.

== Demographics ==
Majority of the residents in Batu Kurau are Malays of Patani origin, they are closely related to Patani Malay communities in Hulu Perak as well as Air Kuning of Batang Padang district and Baling district in the neighbouring state of Kedah. The residents of this town still speaks Reman Malay as their native language alongside Malaysian language. Like the rest of Malaysia, the town also has a significant Chinese and Indian communities and also Malays from outside the state.
