= Belimbing, Malaysia =

Town in Malaysia

Coordinates: 2°21′N 102°15′E

Belimbing is a small town in Pekan District, Pahang, Malaysia, located near Pahang River and Chini Lake. Belimbing means star fruit in Malay.
