= Perak State Route A131 =

Road in Malaysia

Perak Route 131
- Jalan Kampung Poh

Major junctions
- West end: Bidor
- FT 1 Federal Route 1 A132 Atate Route A132; North–South Expressway Northern Route / AH2
- East end: Kampung Poh

Location
- Country: Malaysia

Highway system
- Highways in Malaysia; Expressways; Federal; State

Perak State Route A131, Jalan Kampung Poh is a major road in Perak, Malaysia. It is also a main route to the North–South Expressway Northern Route via Bidor Interchange.

== Junction lists ==
The entire route is located in Batang Padang District, Perak.

Legend:

- I/C - Interchange, I/S - Intersection, RSA - Rest and service area, OBR - Overhead bridge restaurant, R/R - Restaurant and rest plaza, L/B - Layby, V/P - Vista point, TN - tunnel, T/P - Toll plaza, BR - Bridge
- C - Cloverleaf, S - Stack, T-A - Trumpet-A, T-B - Trumpet-B, DT - Directional-T/Y, SDT - Semi-Directional-T/Y, P-Y - Partial-Y, D - Diamond, P-C - Partial cloverleaf, D-D - Diverging diamond, D-R - Direct ramp

Location	km	mi	Name	Destinations	Notes
Bidor			Bidor	FT 1 Malaysia Federal Route 1 – Ipoh, Tapah, Teluk Intan, Terolak, Slim River, Kuala Lumpur	T-junctions
Bidor			Jalan Paku	A132 Perak State Route A132 – Kampung Chabang Baru	T-junctions
Bidor			Bidor-NSE	North–South Expressway Northern Route / AH2 – Bukit Kayu Hitam, Ipoh, Tapah, Sungkai, Slim River, Kuala Lumpur	T-junctions
Bidor			Taman Batang Padang		
Bidor			Kampung Kuala Gepal		
Bidor			Kampung Poh		
1.000 mi = 1.609 km; 1.000 km = 0.621 mi
