= Semeling =

Town in Kuala Muda, Kedah, Malaysia

Coordinates: 5°42′N 100°28′E

Semeling in Kuala Muda District

Semeling is a mukim in Kuala Muda District, Kedah, Malaysia.
