= Dulang =

Dulangkou 杜郎口镇
- Town
- Location in Shandong Dulangkou (China)
- Coordinates: 36°33′34″N 116°23′22″E
- Country: People's Republic of China
- Province: Shandong
- Prefecture-level city: Liaocheng
- County: Chiping
- Time zone: UTC+8 (China Standard)

Dulangkou (Chinese: 杜郎口镇; pinyin: Dùlángkǒu Zhèn) is a town in Chiping District, Liaocheng, in western Shandong province, China.
