= Merbok =

Mukim in Kuala Muda, Kedah, Malaysia

Coordinates: 5°43′N 100°25′E

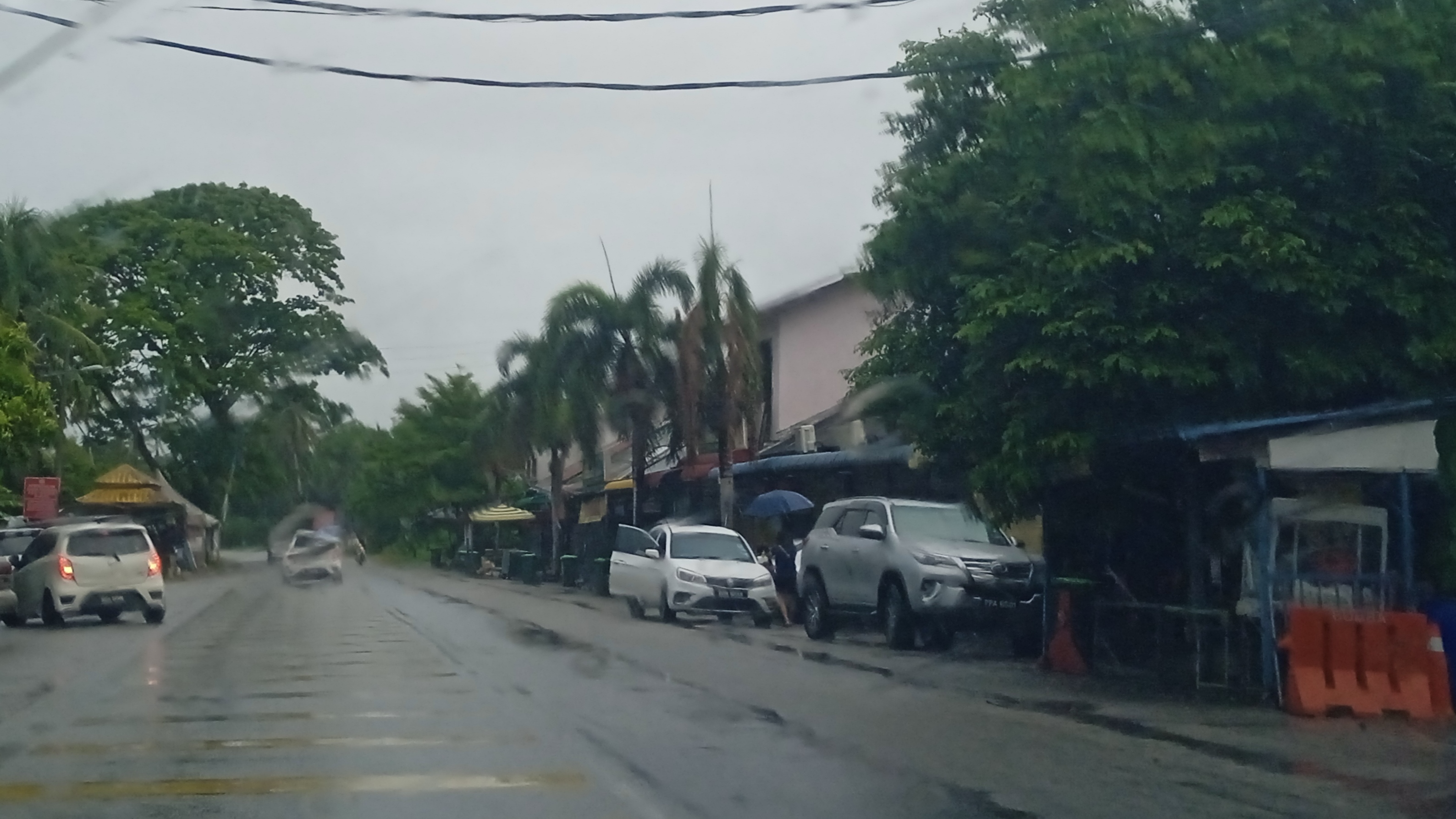
Merbok

Merbok in Kuala Muda District

Merbok is a mukim (sub-district) in the Kuala Muda District of Kedah, Malaysia. It is known for the historical Bujang Valley. The area also hosts the Kedah Campus of Universiti Teknologi MARA (UiTM Merbok/Sungai Petani).

== Etymology ==
The town derived its name from an archaic Langkasuka-Malay language, which means "the declaratory place". Based on the ancient Hikayat Merong Mahawangsa, the declaration of Islam being the state religion of the Kedah Kingdom was done in Merbok estuary port, which situated close to the kingdom's capital during the area, Bukit Meriam (Cannon Hill). This is in contrast from the popular belief that the name owed its origin from the local burung merbok (zebra dove).
