= Malaysia Federal Route 3374 =

Road in Malaysia

Federal Route 3374
- Jalan Tampoi

Route information
- Maintained by Malaysian Public Works Department
- Length: 7.43 km (4.62 mi)

Major junctions
- West end: Tampoi
- FT 1 Skudai Highway; J3 Kempas Highway; J3 Jalan Datin Halimah; FT 3 AH18 Tebrau Highway
- East end: Majidee Malay Village

Location
- Country: Malaysia
- Primary destinations: Bandar Baru UDA, Bandar Damansara Alif, Kempas

Highway system
- Highways in Malaysia; Expressways; Federal; State

Jalan Tampoi, Federal Route 3374 (formerly Johor State Route J2), is a dual carriageway industrial federal roads in Johor Bahru, Johor, Malaysia. Before Pasir Gudang Highway was built, Jalan Tampoi became the main road to Pasir Gudang together with Jalan Masai Lama (Johor State Route J10).

== Route background ==
The Kilometre Zero is located at Tampoi town interchange. The stretch between Datin Halimah Interchange and Kampung Ubi are under construction by Malaysian Public Works Department (JKR) thru Syarikat Ismail Ibrahim Sdn Bhd as the Main Contractor. The existing two lanes will be fully four-lane roadways. Completion works expected on 25 May 2011.

== Features ==
At most sections, the Federal Route 3374 was built under the JKR R5 road standard, allowing maximum speed limit of up to 90 km/h.

== Junction lists ==
The entire route is located in Johor Bahru District, Johor.

Legend:

- I/C - Interchange, I/S - Intersection, RSA - Rest and service area, OBR - Overhead bridge restaurant, R/R - Restaurant and rest plaza, L/B - Layby, V/P - Vista point, TN - tunnel, T/P - Toll plaza, BR - Bridge
- C - Cloverleaf, S - Stack, T-A - Trumpet-A, T-B - Trumpet-B, DT - Directional-T/Y, SDT - Semi-Directional-T/Y, P-Y - Partial-Y, D - Diamond, P-C - Partial cloverleaf, D-D - Diverging diamond, D-R - Direct ramp

Location	km	mi	Exit	Name	Destinations	Notes
Tampoi	0.0	0.0		Tampoi; Skudai Highway	FT 1 Skudai Highway – Kulai, Senai International Airport, Senai, Skudai, Pontian, City Centre, Woodlands (Singapore); North–South Expressway Southern Route / AH2 – Kuala Lumpur, Malacca Second Link Expressway / AH143 – Tuas (Singapore); Jalan Pengkalan Rinting – Tan Sri Mohammad Rahmat Complex	Diamond interchange
Tampoi				Plaza Angsana	Jalan Padi Mahsuri – Plaza Angsana, Bandar Baru UDA	Junctions
Bandar Baru UDA				Desa Mohamad Rahmat	Desa Mohamad Rahmat	Junctions
Bandar Baru UDA				Bandar Baru UDA	Jalan Persiaran Tanjung – Taman Johor, Hospital Permai Johor Bahru; Jalan Padi Mahsuri – Bandar Baru UDA	Junctions
Bandar Baru UDA			Shell L/B			
Bandar Baru UDA				Taman Orkid	Taman Orkid	LILO
Bandar Damansara Alif				Bandar Damansara Alif	Persiaran Mahkota – Bandar Damansara Alif	Roundabout
Bandar Damansara Alif				Jalan Tahana	Jalan Tahana – Bandar Baru UDA	T-junctions
Bandar Damansara Alif				Bandar Damansara Alif	Persiaran Aliff Harmoni 6 – Bandar Damansara Alif	T-junctions
Bandar Damansara Alif			Petronas L/B			
Tampoi Industrial Area				Jentayu Residensi Condominium		
Tampoi Industrial Area			Shell L/B			
Tampoi Industrial Area				Jalan Tara	Jalan Tara	T-junctions
Tampoi Industrial Area				Taman Bunga Ros	Taman Bunga Ros	T-junctions
Tampoi Industrial Area			BH Petrol L/B			
Tampoi Industrial Area				Kempas Highway	J3 Kempas Highway – Pasir Gudang, Kota Tinggi, Kempas; North–South Expressway Southern Route / AH2 – Kuala Lumpur, Malacca; J3 Jalan Datin Halimah – Larkin, City Centre, Larkin Sentral	Diamond interchange
Tebrau Industrial Park				Jalan Hasil	Jalan Hasil	T-junctions
Tebrau Industrial Park				Kampung Ungku Mohsin	Kampung Ungku Mohsin	T-junctions
Tebrau Industrial Park			Shell L/B			
Tebrau Industrial Park			Petron L/B			
Tebrau Industrial Park				Tebrau Industrial Park I	Tebrau Industrial Park I	Junctions
Tebrau Industrial Park				Taman Gembira	Taman Gembira	T-junctions
Majidee Malay Village				Majidee Malay Village	Majidee Malay Village	T-junctions
Majidee Malay Village			Majidee Malay Village L/B			
Majidee Malay Village				Kampung Ubi	Kampung Ubi	T-junctions
Majidee Malay Village				Majidee Malay Village; Jalan Tebrau	FT 3 / AH18 Tebrau Highway – Kota Tinggi, Pasir Gudang, Bandar Sri Alam, City Centre, Woodlands (Singapore); North–South Expressway Southern Route / AH2 –Kuala Lumpur, Malacca	Directional-T interchange
1.000 mi = 1.609 km; 1.000 km = 0.621 mi
