= Johor State Route J105 =

Road in Malaysia

Johor Route 105
- Jalan Seelong–Kempas; Jalan Kempas Lama

Major junctions
- North end: Senai
- J8 State Route J8; Persiaran Perniagaan Setia; North–South Expressway Southern Route / AH2; J3 Kempas Highway; FT 1 Skudai Highway
- South end: Tampoi

Location
- Country: Malaysia
- Primary destinations: Kampung Maju Jaya, Kempas

Highway system
- Highways in Malaysia; Expressways; Federal; State

Johor State Route J105, is a major road in Johor, Malaysia. It formed by two major parts of road, Jalan Seelong–Kempas and Jalan Kempas Lama. The terminus part of both roads is located at Kempas Interchange in North–South Expressway Southern Route.

== Junction lists ==
The entire route is located in Johor.

Legend:

- I/C - Interchange, I/S - Intersection, RSA - Rest and service area, OBR - Overhead bridge restaurant, R/R - Restaurant and rest plaza, L/B - Layby, V/P - Vista point, TN - tunnel, T/P - Toll plaza, BR - Bridge
- C - Cloverleaf, S - Stack, T-A - Trumpet-A, T-B - Trumpet-B, DT - Directional-T/Y, SDT - Semi-Directional-T/Y, P-Y - Partial-Y, D - Diamond, P-C - Partial cloverleaf, D-D - Diverging diamond, D-R - Direct ramp

District	Location	km	mi	Name	Destinations	Notes
Kulai	Seelong			Seelong	J8 Johor State Route J8 – Senai International Airport, Kulai, Senai, Johor Bahru, Ulu Tiram, Kota Tinggi Second Link Expressway / AH143 – Kuala Lumpur, Tuas (Singapore)	T-junctions
Johor Bahru	Bandar Dato' Onn			Persiaran Impian Jaya	Persiaran Impian Jaya	T-junctions
Johor Bahru	Bandar Dato' Onn			Kampung Seelong Jaya		
Johor Bahru	Bandar Dato' Onn			Kampung Maju Jaya		
Johor Bahru	Bandar Dato' Onn			Persiaran Perniagaan Setia	Persiaran Perniagaan Setia – Bandar Dato' Onn	T-junctions
Johor Bahru	Kempas			Starhill Golf and Country Club		
Johor Bahru	Kempas			Kempas-NSE	North–South Expressway Southern Route / AH2 – Kuala Lumpur, Malacca, Skudai, Pasir Gudang, Johor Bahru, Woodlands (Singapore)	Cloverleaf interchange
Johor Bahru	Kempas			Kempas Highway	J3 Kempas Highway – Kempas, Tampoi, Larkin, Johor Bahru, Setia Tropika, Larkin Sentral	T-junctions
Johor Bahru	Kempas			Railway crossing bridge		
Johor Bahru	Tampoi			Taman Perusahaan Ringan Pulai		
Johor Bahru	Tampoi			Skudai Highway	FT 1 Skudai Highway – Tampoi, Johor Bahru, Woodlands (Singapore)	LILO Southbound
1.000 mi = 1.609 km; 1.000 km = 0.621 mi: Incomplete access
