= Skudai Highway =

Road in Malaysia

Federal Route 1
- Skudai Highway
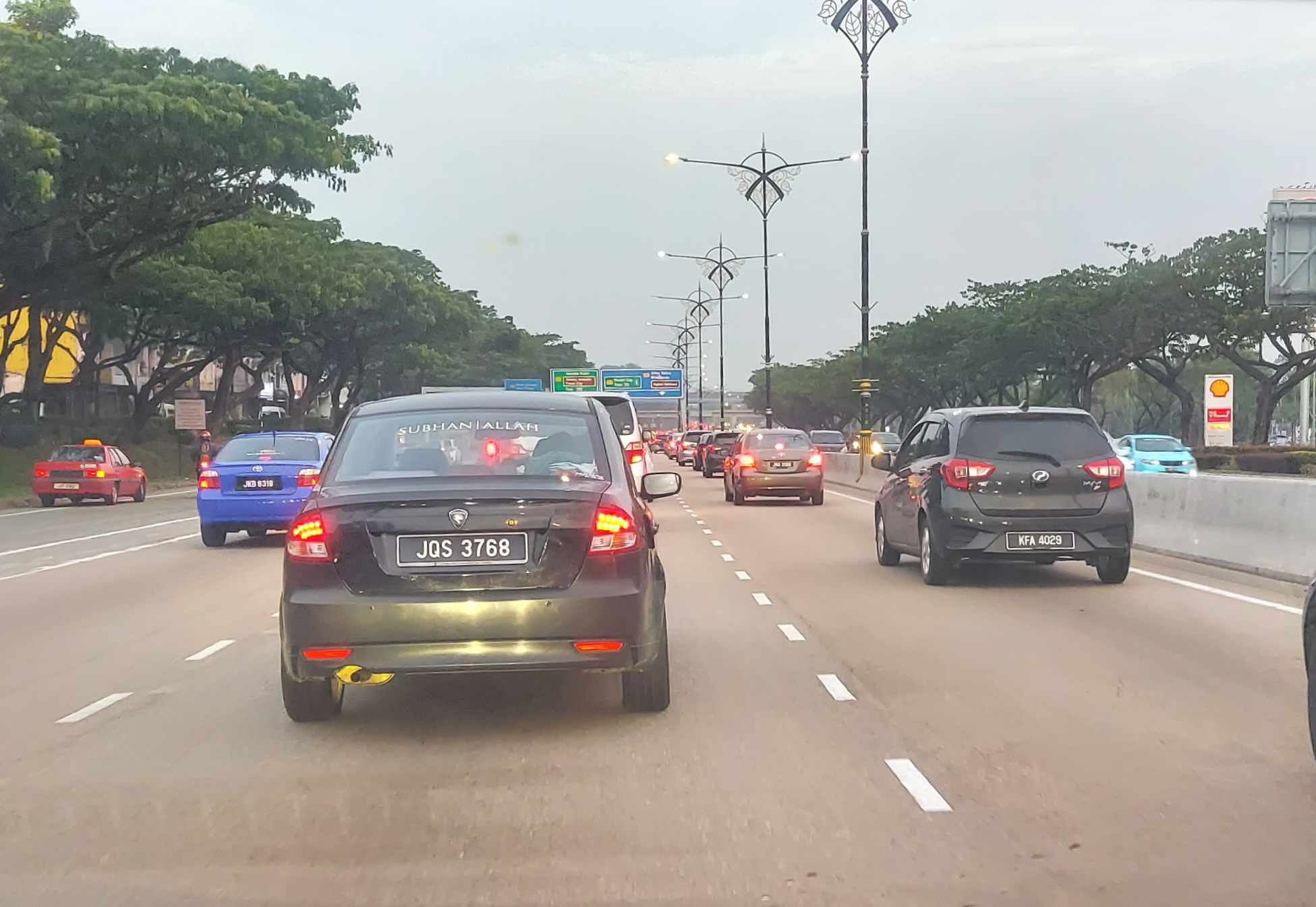

Route information
- Maintained by Malaysian Public Works Department
- Length: 29 km (18 mi)
- Existed: 1983–present
- History: Completed in 1985

Major junctions
- North end: Senai
- Second Link Expressway; FT 16 Senai Airport Highway; North–South Expressway Southern Route / AH2; FT 5 Skudai-Pontian Highway; FT 17 Pasir Gudang Highway; FT 52 J1 Iskandar Coastal Highway; FT 188 Johor Bahru Inner Ring Road FT 3 / AH18 Tebrau Highway
- South end: Johor Bahru

Location
- Country: Malaysia
- Primary destinations: Senai International Airport, Skudai, Tampoi, Woodlands (Singapore)

Highway system
- Highways in Malaysia; Expressways; Federal; State

Skudai Highway (Malay: Lebuhraya Skudai; Chinese: 士姑来快速公路), also known as Senai Highway (Malay: Lebuhraya Senai; Chinese: 士乃快速公路), Jalan Tun Abdul Razak or Jalan Skudai, Federal Route 1, is a 29 kilometre partial-access highway in Johor, Malaysia, from the town of Senai in Kulai District to Johor Bahru City in Johor Bahru District. The highway is designated as part of Federal Route 1.

== History ==
Opened to traffic in 1985, Skudai Highway was built as an upgrade to the Federal Route 1, as part of the North–South Expressway project. It was built as a four-lane highway (two in each direction). The stretch from Bandar Baru Uda to Skudai was widened to six lanes in 2001 to enable the highway to handle higher traffic capacity.

Skudai Highway used to be a tolled highway with two toll plazas, the Senai toll plaza and the Johor Causeway toll plaza. The highway concession was held by PLUS Expressway Berhad, the concessionaire of the North–South Expressway. In March 2004, the federal government decided to abolish the Senai toll plaza, and maintenance responsibility of the highway was transferred to the Malaysian Public Works Department. The Johor Causeway toll plaza remained in operation until 2008.

Until 2008, the highway was linked to the Johor–Singapore Causeway on its southern end via the former Johor Bahru CIQ Complex. With the opening of the new CIQ complex, Sultan Iskandar Building, access to the Causeway and Singapore is provided by the Eastern Dispersal Link.

The Tampoi North Interchange has been upgraded to a Double U-Turn interchange. Construction began in 2005 and was completed in 2008. Meanwhile, Skudai North junctions between Route 1 and Route 5 has been upgraded to trumpet interchanges. Construction began in 2005 and was completed in August 2007.

== Interchange lists ==
The entire route is located in Johor.

Legend:

- I/C - Interchange, I/S - Intersection, RSA - Rest and service area, OBR - Overhead bridge restaurant, R/R - Restaurant and rest plaza, L/B - Layby, V/P - Vista point, TN - tunnel, T/P - Toll plaza, BR - Bridge
- C - Cloverleaf, S - Stack, T-A - Trumpet-A, T-B - Trumpet-B, DT - Directional-T/Y, SDT - Semi-Directional-T/Y, P-Y - Partial-Y, D - Diamond, P-C - Partial cloverleaf, D-D - Diverging diamond, D-R - Direct ramp

District	Location	km	mi	Exit	Name	Destinations	Notes
Kulai	Kulai	27.1	16.8	Through to FT 1 Malaysia Federal Route 1			
Kulai	Kulai	27.1	16.8	Former Senai toll plaza location			
Kulai	Kulai	27.0	16.8		Malaysian Highway Authority Southern Regional Office	Malaysian Highway Authority Southern Regional Office	Northbound
Kulai	Kulai			116	Saleng I/C	Second Link Expressway (Senai Link) – Tuas (Singapore), Iskandar Puteri, Kuala Lumpur, Johor Premium Outlets	Off-ramp from Johor Bahru direction; on-ramp to northbound direction
Kulai	Kulai				Senai; Taman Senai Utama		
Kulai	Kulai			115	Senai; Senai Airport Highway I/C	FT 16 Senai Airport Highway – Senai International Airport; Senai–Desaru Expressway – Ulu Tiram, Kota Tinggi, Pasir Gudang, Desaru	Multi-tier interchange
Kulai	Kulai				Senai; Masjid Bandar Senai		
Kulai	Kulai			Sungai Senai bridge			
Kulai	Kulai				Senai		
Kulai	Kulai			114	Senai; Senai I/S	Taman Damai, Taman Bahagia	Junctions
Kulai	Kulai				Senai		
Kulai	Kulai				Senai; Taman Senai	Taman Senai	Northbound; LILO
Kulai	Kulai				U-Turn	FT 1 – Kulai, Senai Town Centre, Senai International Airport	Southbound
Kulai	Kulai				U-Turn	FT 1 – Skudai, Johor Bahru, Pontian	Northbound
Kulai	Kulai	23.0	14.3	113	Skudai-NSE I/C	North–South Expressway Southern Route / AH2 – Kuala Lumpur, Malacca, Senai International Airport, Tuas (Singapore), Kempas, Johor Bahru, Woodlands (Singapore)	Cloverleaf interchange
Kulai	Kulai				Johor Technology Park Exit	Persiaran Teknologi – Johor Technology Park, SIRIM Southern Region	Northbound; LILO
Kulai	Kulai				University of Technology Malaysia (UTM) (Gate 3)	University of Technology Malaysia (UTM) (Gate 3)	Northbound; LILO
Johor Bahru	Iskandar Puteri				U-Turn	FT 1 – Kulai, Senai, Senai International Airport, Desaru	U-Turn; Southbound
Johor Bahru	Iskandar Puteri				U-Turn	FT 1 – Skudai, Johor Bahru, Woodlands (Singapore), Pasir Gudang, Pontian	U-Turn; Northbound
Johor Bahru	Iskandar Puteri				PUB-Skudai	Public Utilities Board (PUB) Singapore-Skudai water pipe maintenance facilities	Southbound
Johor Bahru	Iskandar Puteri				Skudai TNB intake	Tenaga Nasional Berhad (TNB)-Skudai intake	Northbound
Johor Bahru	Iskandar Puteri	19.0	11.8	112	Skudai North I/C	FT 5 Skudai-Pontian Highway – Pekan Nanas, Pontian, Kukup, Tanjung Piai, Universiti Teknologi Malaysia (UTM); Persiaran Impian Emas – Taman Impian Emas	Trumpet interchange
Johor Bahru	Iskandar Puteri				Skudai; Skudai Parade		Southbound
Johor Bahru	Iskandar Puteri				Skudai; MBIP	Iskandar Puteri City Council (MBIP) main headquarters	Northbound
Johor Bahru	Iskandar Puteri			Skudai flyover Start/End of flyover			
Johor Bahru	Iskandar Puteri	17.0	10.6	111	Skudai; Skudai I/C	J4 Johor State Route J4 – Taman Ungku Tun Aminah, Lima Kedai, Gelang Patah	Diamond interchange
Johor Bahru	Iskandar Puteri				Skudai; Taman Ungku Tun Aminah	Taman Ungku Tun Aminah	Northbound
Johor Bahru	Iskandar Puteri			Skudai flyover Start/End of flyover			
Johor Bahru	MBIP-MBJB			Sungai Skudai bridge			
Johor Bahru	Johor Bahru				Southern University College	Southern University College	Southbound
Johor Bahru	Johor Bahru			Caltex L/B (northbound)			
Johor Bahru	Johor Bahru				Jalan Kempas Lama	J105 Johor State Route J105 – Kempas, Seri Tropika	Southbound; LILO
Johor Bahru	Johor Bahru				Taman Sutera Utama	Jalan Sutera Danga – Taman Sutera Utama	Northbound; LILO
Johor Bahru	Johor Bahru			110	Paradigm Mall I/C	Jalan Mewah Ria 2 – Paradigm Mall	Directional-T interchange
Johor Bahru	Johor Bahru				Taman Munshi Ibrahim	Jalan Segenting – Taman Munshi Ibrahim	Southbound; LILO
Johor Bahru	Johor Bahru				Taman Tampoi Indah	Jalan Titiwangsa 3 – Taman Tampoi Indah, Shell petrol stations	Northbound; LILO
Johor Bahru	Johor Bahru				Taman Johor	Jalan Ledang – Taman Johor	Southbound; LILO
Johor Bahru	Johor Bahru			109	Tampoi North I/C	FT 17 Pasir Gudang Highway – Perling, Bandar Sri Alam, Pasir Gudang, Johor Port Second Link Expressway (Pontian-Johor Bahru Parkway) / AH143 – Iskandar Puteri, Gelang Patah, Port of Tanjung Pelepas, Tuas (Singapore)	Double u-turn interchange
Johor Bahru	Johor Bahru			Petronas L/B (southbound)			
Johor Bahru	Johor Bahru				Giant Hypermarket Tampoi	Giant Hypermarket Tampoi	Southbound
Johor Bahru	Johor Bahru	10.0	6.2	108	Tampoi; Tampoi I/C	FT 3374 Malaysia Federal Route 3374 – Pengkalan Rinting, Kompleks Tan Sri, Mohammad Rahmat, Bandar Baru UDA, Kempas, Bandar Damansara Alif, Hospital Permai Johor Bahru	Diamond interchange
Johor Bahru	Johor Bahru			Sungai Tampoi bridge			
Johor Bahru	Johor Bahru				Bandar Baru UDA	Jalan Padi – Bandar Baru UDA, Petronas petrol stations and southern headquarters	Southbound; LILO
Johor Bahru	Johor Bahru			107	Danga Bay flyover (towards Senai only); Danga Bay I/C	FT 52 / J1 Iskandar Coastal Highway – Iskandar Puteri, Gelang Patah, Perling, Kota Iskandar, Danga Bay, Istana Bukit Serene, Dataran Bandaraya, Sultan Abu Bakar State Mosque, Istana Besar, Sultanah Aminah Hospital	Interchange
Johor Bahru	Johor Bahru			106	Taman Tasek I/S	Jalan Tasek – Taman Tasek	Northbound; LILO
Johor Bahru	Johor Bahru			Petronas Shell L/B (northbound)			
Johor Bahru	Johor Bahru			105	RJCC I/C	Royal Johor Country Club	Half diamond interchange
Johor Bahru	Johor Bahru	6.0	3.7	104	Jalan Datin Halimah I/C	J3 Jalan Datin Halimah – Larkin, Larkin Sentral, Jalan Kolam Ayer, Kompleks RTM Sultan Iskandar, Dataran Bandaraya, Taman Merdeka	Cloverleaf interchange
Johor Bahru	Johor Bahru				Jalan Yahya Awal	Jalan Yahya Awal – Hutan Bandar	Northbound; LILO
Johor Bahru	Johor Bahru				Taman Larkin	Jalan Kebun Teh – Taman Larkin	Southbound; LILO
Johor Bahru	Johor Bahru				Johor Bahru Central Fire Station	Johor Bahru Central Fire Station	
Johor Bahru	Johor Bahru				Jalan Kebun Teh	Jalan Kebun Teh – Jalan Dato' Jaafar, Malaysian Public Works Department (JKR) Johor state Headquarters	Southbound; LILO
Johor Bahru	Johor Bahru			103	Ulu Ayer Molek I/C	Jalan Ulu Ayer Molek – Jalan Dato' Abdul Rahman Andak; Jalan Kebun Teh Lama	T-junctions and LILO
Johor Bahru	Johor Bahru				Danga City Mall	Danga City Mall	Southbound
Johor Bahru	Johor Bahru			102	Danga City Mall-JBIRR I/C	FT 188 Johor Bahru Inner Ring Road – Jalan Skudai, Dataran Bandaraya, Jalan Yahya Awal, Woodlands (Singapore), Stulang	Multi level Single-point urban interchange
Johor Bahru	Johor Bahru	1.0	0.62	101	Johor Bahru; Landmark I/C	FT 3 / AH18 Tebrau Highway – Mersing, Desaru, Kota Tinggi, Bandar Sri Alam, Pasir Gudang, Permas Jaya, Woodlands (Singapore)	Cloverleaf interchange
Johor Bahru	Johor Bahru				Komtar JBCC		
Johor Bahru	Johor Bahru			Caltex L/B (southbound)			
Johor Bahru	Johor Bahru				Johor Bahru City Square		
Johor Bahru	Johor Bahru				JB Sentral	P&R JB Sentral – Arrival/Departure, Tourist Information Centre; KTM ETS	
Johor Bahru	Johor Bahru			Johor Bahru old customs and immigration checkpoint Toll operation discontinued			
Johor Bahru	Johor Bahru	0.0	0.0		Johor Bahru old railway station	Johor Bahru old railway station Jalan Station – Wong Ah Fook Street	T-junctions
1.000 mi = 1.609 km; 1.000 km = 0.621 mi: Concurrency terminus; Closed/former; Incomplete access

== See also ==
- Federal Route 1
- Johor–Singapore Causeway
- North–South Expressway
- North–South Expressway Southern Route
- Malaysian Federal Roads system
- Malaysian Expressway System
