= Abdul Razak Hussein =

Prime Minister of Malaysia from 1970 to 1976

Yang Amat Berbahagia Tun Abdul Razak Hussein DMN DK I (Pahang) DK (Kelantan) SMN DUK SIMP SPMJ SPMK SPMS SPMP SPCM DUPN SPDK SPMT DP SPMP SPMB DPMB GCMG
- عبد الرزاق حسين
- Official portrait, 1970s

2nd Prime Minister of Malaysia
- In office 22 September 1970 – 14 January 1976
- Monarchs: Abdul Halim; Yahya Petra
- Deputy: Ismail Abdul Rahman; Hussein Onn
- Preceded by: Tunku Abdul Rahman
- Succeeded by: Hussein Onn

President of UMNO
- In office 25 January 1971 – 14 January 1976
- Preceded by: Tunku Abdul Rahman
- Succeeded by: Hussein Onn
Ministerial portfolios
Deputy Prime Minister of Malaysia
In office 31 August 1957 – 22 September 1970
Monarchs	Abdul Rahman; Hisamuddin; Putra; Ismail Nasiruddin; Abdul Halim
Prime Minister	Tunku Abdul Rahman
Preceded by	Office established
Succeeded by	Ismail Abdul Rahman
Menteri Besar of Pahang
In office 1 February 1955 – 15 June 1955
Monarch	Abu Bakar
Preceded by	Tengku Muhamad Sultan Ahmad
Succeeded by	Tengku Muhamad Sultan Ahmad
Minister
1955–1957	Education
1957–1970	Defence
1957–1970	National and Rural Development
1967–1969	Home Affairs
1970–1975	Foreign Affairs
1974	Finance
1974–1976	Defence
Parliamentary offices
Member of Parliament for Pekan
In office 11 September 1959 – 14 January 1976 (Note: Parliament suspended between 15 May 1969 and 20 February 1971.)
Preceded by	Constituency created
Succeeded by	Najib Razak
Political positions
1950–1951	Leader of UMNO Youth
1970–1973	Leader of Alliance Party
1973–1976	Chairman of Barisan Nasional

Personal details
- Born: Abdul Razak bin Hussein; 11 March 1922 Pekan, Pahang, Federated Malay States
- Died: 14 January 1976 (aged 53) London, England
- Resting place: Makam Pahlawan, Masjid Negara, Kuala Lumpur
- Party: Labour (1947–1950); UMNO (1950–1976)
- Other political affiliations: Alliance (1955–1973); BN (1973–1976)
- Spouse: Rahah Noah (m. 1952)
- Children: 5 (including Najib and Nazir)
- Parents: Hussein Awang Mohd Taib (father); Hajah Teh Fatimah Daud (mother)
- Education: Malay College Kuala Kangsar
- Alma mater: Raffles College (unfinished); Lincoln's Inn (LLB)
- Awards: Full list

Military service
- Branch/service: Askar Wataniah Pahang
- Years of service: 1941–1945
- Rank: Captain
- Unit: Force 136
- Battles/wars: World War II

Abdul Razak bin Hussein (Jawi: عبد الرزاق بن حسين; 11 March 1922 – 14 January 1976) was a Malaysian lawyer and politician who served as the second prime minister of Malaysia from 1970 until his death in 1976. He also served as the first deputy prime minister of Malaysia from 1957 to 1970. He is referred to as the "Father of Development" ("Bapa Pembangunan") of Malaysia.

During his term as prime minister, Abdul Razak launched the Malaysian New Economic Policy (NEP), a program aimed at reducing the socioeconomic disparity between ethnic communities, particularly those of the ethnic Malay and Chinese. He also oversaw a realignment of Malaysia foreign policy away from his predecessor's pro-West and anti-Communist attitude and towards neutrality, with the country becoming a member of the Non-Aligned Movement in 1970. Abdul Razak was also the figure responsible for setting up Barisan Nasional (BN), a political coalition which held power uninterrupted from its inception in 1974 to 2018.

His eldest son, Najib Razak, became the sixth prime minister in 2009; however, later became infamous for his involvement in the 1MDB corruption scandal, which led to his conviction on multiple charges of corruption, abuse of power, and money laundering.

== Early life and education ==
Born in Kampung Pulau Keladi, a village located northwest of Pekan, Pahang on 11 March 1922, Abdul Razak is the first of two children to Hussein Awang bin Mohd Taib (1898–1950) and Fatimah binti Daud (1906–1968). An aristocratic descendant holding the title Orang Kaya Indera Shahbandar, Abdul Razak studied at the Malay College Kuala Kangsar.

After joining the Malay Administrative Service in 1938, he was awarded a scholarship to study at Raffles College in Singapore in 1940. His studies at the college ceased with the onset of the Second World War. During the war he helped organise the Wataniah resistance movement in Pahang.

After World War II, Abdul Razak left for Britain in 1948 to study law. In 1950, he received a law degree and qualified as a barrister at Lincoln's Inn in London. During his student days in England, Abdul Razak was a member of the British Labour Party and a prominent student leader of the Malay Association of Great Britain, and formed the student association Malayan Forum.

== Involvement in World War II ==
After his studies were interrupted in 1942 because of World War II, Abdul Razak returned to Kuantan, Pahang. There, he met his former colleague from the Malay Administrative Service, Yeop Mahidin, and expressed his interest in joining the Malay Regiment (now Royal Malay Regiment). Mahidin, who was also the founder of Askar Wataniah Pahang ('Pahang State Territorial Army'; precursor of the Rejimen Askar Wataniah), recruited Razak into his new guerrilla force. Upon the completion of his training, Razak was instructed to join the Japanese Malayan Civil Service as an agent and informant.

Razak, as an aristocrat and son of a respected Malay leader in Pahang, was posted to his home state of Pahang as an assistant to District Officer and at the same time as a bridge for the Japanese to gain the trust of local Malays. Using his privileges as an aristocrat, Razak started networking with the Imperial Japanese Forces while maintaining his connection with Yeop Mahidin. His role as an informant inside the Japanese Administration was only known to a few. Because of this, Razak was labelled as a traitor by the rest of the Wataniah Pahang.

As the Malay population received preferential treatment compared to other ethnic groups, it was not fully trusted by the British to oppose the Japanese occupation. Nevertheless, the Askar Wataniah Pahang with its 200 members were absorbed into the Special Operations Executive (SOE) and organised under Force 136.

Force 136 Pahang's missions' continuous success made the Japanese Administration begin to suspect that there were informants inside their administration. Force 136 Pahang quickly set up an extraction mission to recover their agent, Razak, who was still unknown to many of its members.

== Early political career ==
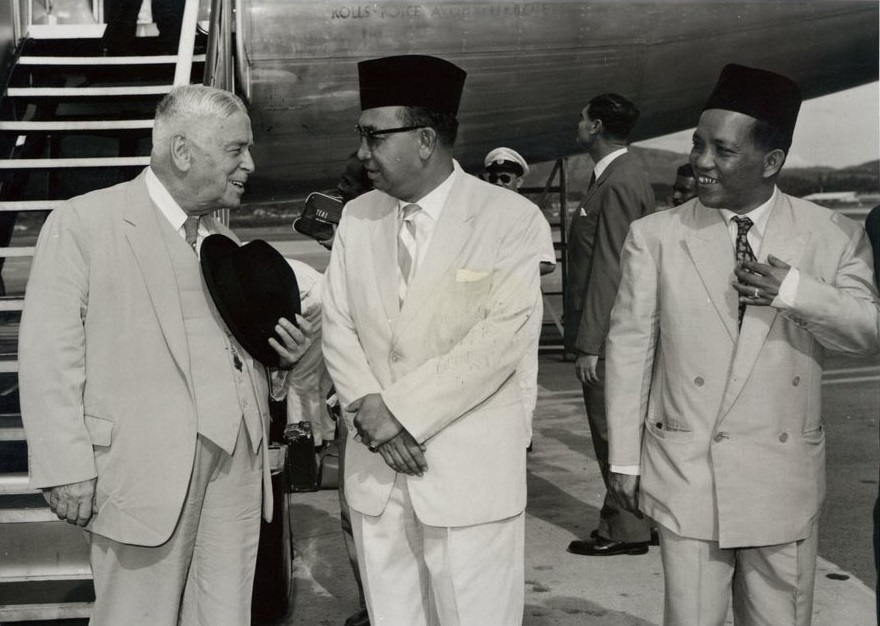
Deputy Prime Minister Razak greeting New Zealand Prime Minister Walter Nash in 1960.

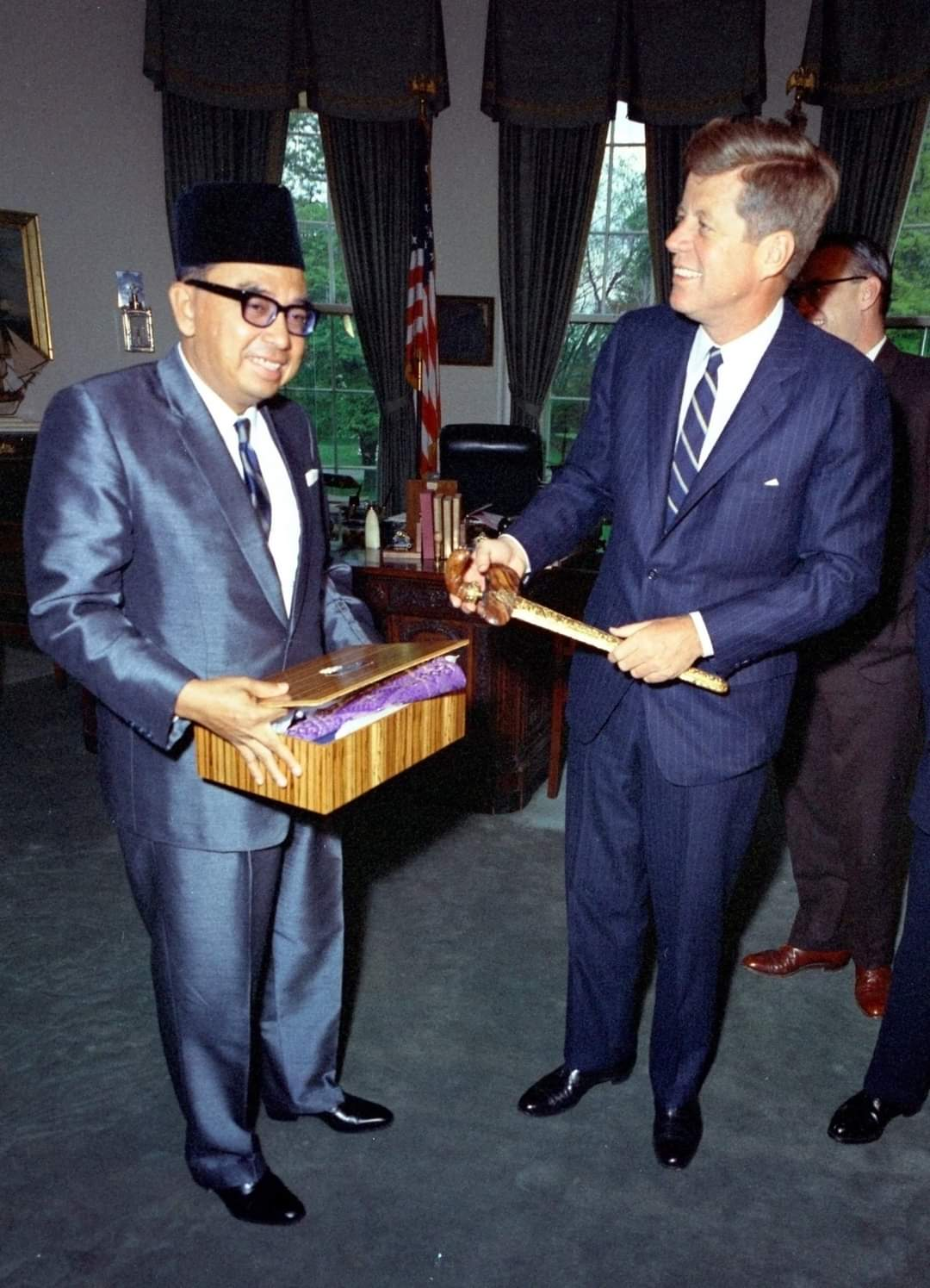
Deputy Prime Minister Razak with U.S. President John F. Kennedy in the White House, 1961

Upon his return from the United Kingdom, in 1950, Tun Razak joined the Malayan Civil Service. Owing to his political calibre, he became the youth chief for United Malays National Organisation (UMNO). Two years later, he worked as the Assistant State Secretary of Pahang and in February 1955, at just 33 years of age, became Pahang's Chief Minister.

Razak stood in and won a seat in Malaya's first general elections in July 1955 and was appointed as the Education Minister. He was instrumental in the drafting of the Razak Report which formed the basis of the Malayan education system. Tun Razak was also a key member of the February 1956 mission to London to seek the independence of Malaya from the British.

He was appointed Deputy Prime Minister and Minister of Defence in 1957 and, after the 1959 general election, also held the Ministry of National and Rural Development portfolio. His ideas concerning rural development and agriculture were collected into the Red Book (Buku Merah) and Green Book (Buku Hijau) respectively and served as the basis for government policy during his time in power.

In 1965 Razak was closely involved in the negotiations with Singaporean leaders for the Independence of Singapore Agreement.

== Prime Minister ==
- Abdul Razak Hussein; 22 September 1970 – 14 January 1976
- Monarchs: Abdul Halim; Yahya Petra
- Prime Minister: Abdul Razak Hussein
- Cabinet: Razak I; Razak II
- Party: Alliance–UMNO (1970–1973); BN–UMNO (1973–1976)
- Election: 1974
- Seat: Seri Taman

=== Gaining power ===
In the aftermath of the ethnic riot of 1969, known as the 13 May incident, incumbent prime minister Tunku Abdul Rahman was subjected to criticism from Malay nationalists within UMNO, among them supporters of Abdul Razak, for his pluralist and accommodating attitude towards the country's non-Malay population. During the state of emergency that lasted from 1969 to 1971, Tunku's power as prime minister was eroded by Abdul Razak, who led the National Operations Council that ruled in lieu of the elected government, culminating in his resignation in 1970. The official narrative of the 13 May incident and the circumstances under which Abdul Razak became prime minister are still contested by some.

=== Domestic affairs ===
The government excised Kuala Lumpur from the state of Selangor in 1974, which served to detach five opposition parliamentary seats from the Selangor legislative council, helping prevent the state from falling into the hands of opposition parties. It also kept to the previous government's decision to suspend local government elections and through a parliamentary act allowed state governments to take over local authorities and appoint members to relevant bodies.

=== Foreign affairs ===
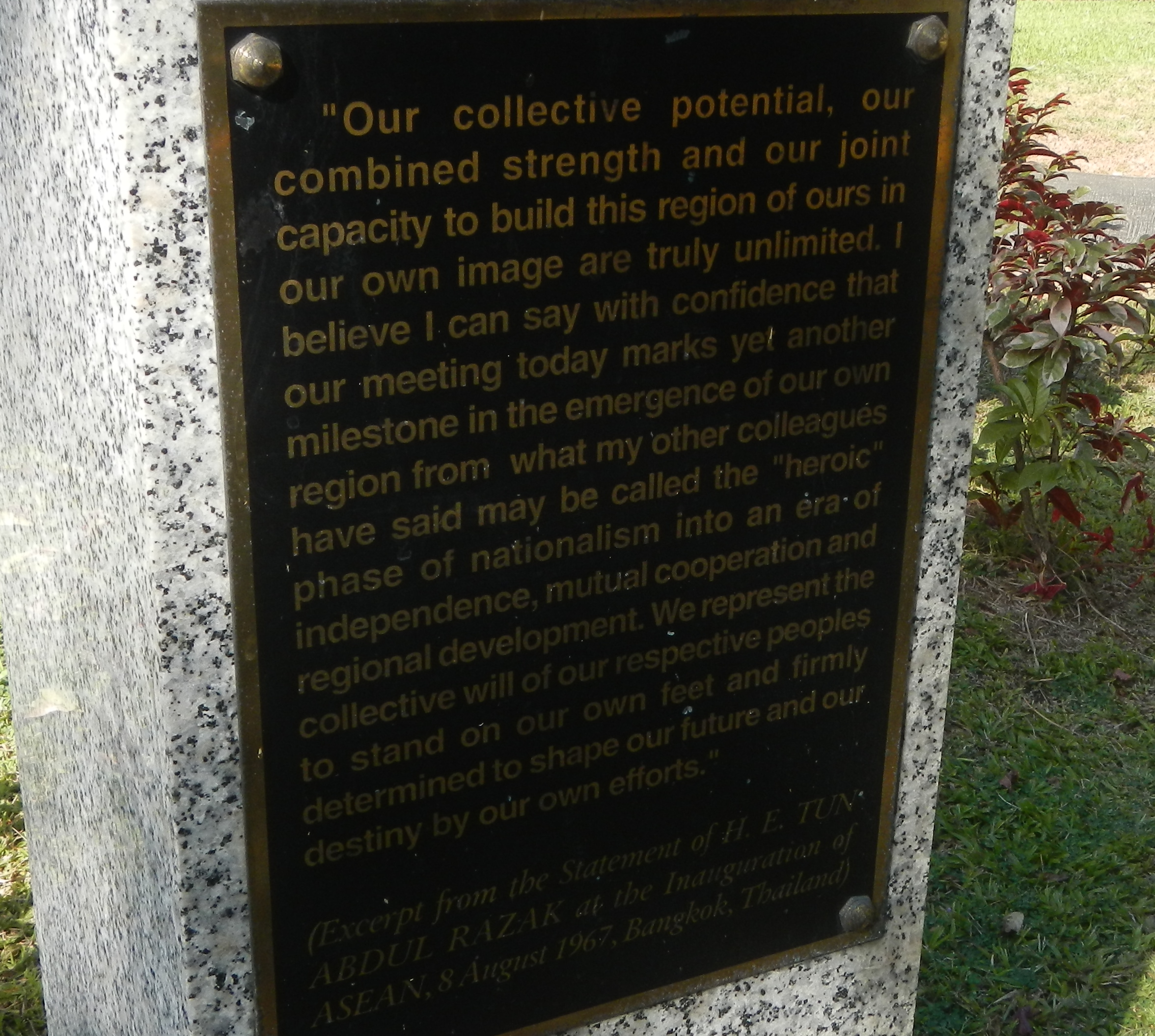
Bust of Tun Abdul Razak at the ASEAN Garden with the excerpt from his statement at the inauguration of ASEAN.

Abdul Razak also took up the Ministry of Foreign Affairs portfolio upon becoming prime minister and oversaw a realignment of the country's foreign policy away from the West and anti-Communism towards neutrality and non-alignment in international conflicts, as well as an increased focus on regional affairs through the Association of Southeast Asian Nations (ASEAN).

Malaysia joined the Non-Aligned Movement in 1970, while the Anglo-Malayan military alliance was replaced with the Five Power Defence Arrangements in 1971. It also became a signatory of the Zone of Peace, Freedom and Neutrality Declaration (ZOPFAN) in 1971 as part of ASEAN.

Bilateral relations with the People's Republic of China were inaugurated with Abdul Razak's state visit and Malaysia's adoption of the One China Policy in 1974.

== Death ==
Abdul Razak was diagnosed with leukemia in 1969 and given two years to live, but kept the diagnosis secret from his friends and family.

Abdul Razak died in office on 14 January 1976 while seeking medical treatment in London. He was posthumously granted the soubriquet Bapa Pembangunan ('Father of Development'). He was laid to rest in Heroes Mausoleum (Malay: Makam Pahlawan) near Masjid Negara, Kuala Lumpur.

== Filmography ==
List of films
Year	Title	Role	Notes	Link(s)
1969	The Red Book	Himself	Tun Abdul Razak makes his debut in the film to explain the policy of rural economic development. The film was produced by Malayan Film Unit (currently FINAS).	External videos: Retrospektif: The Red Book (1969) via YouTube channel by FINAS.

== Election results ==
Parliament of Malaysia
Year	Constituency	Candidate	Votes	Pct	Opponent(s)	Votes	Pct	Ballots cast	Majority	Turnout
1959	P062 Pekan	Abdul Razak Hussein (UMNO)	8,811	77.26%	Mohamed Ariff Abas (PMIP)	2,593	22.74%	11,508	6,218	74.52%
1964	P062 Pekan	Abdul Razak Hussein (UMNO)	11,858	87.39%	Abdul Hamid Awang Hitam (PMIP)	1,711	12.61%	14,165	10,147	76.63%
1969	P062 Pekan	Abdul Razak Hussein (UMNO)	12,641	77.28%	Yazid Jaafar (PMIP)	3,716	22.72%	16,845	8,925	71.24%
1974	P071 Pekan	Abdul Razak Hussein (UMNO)	Unopposed							

== Awards and recognitions ==
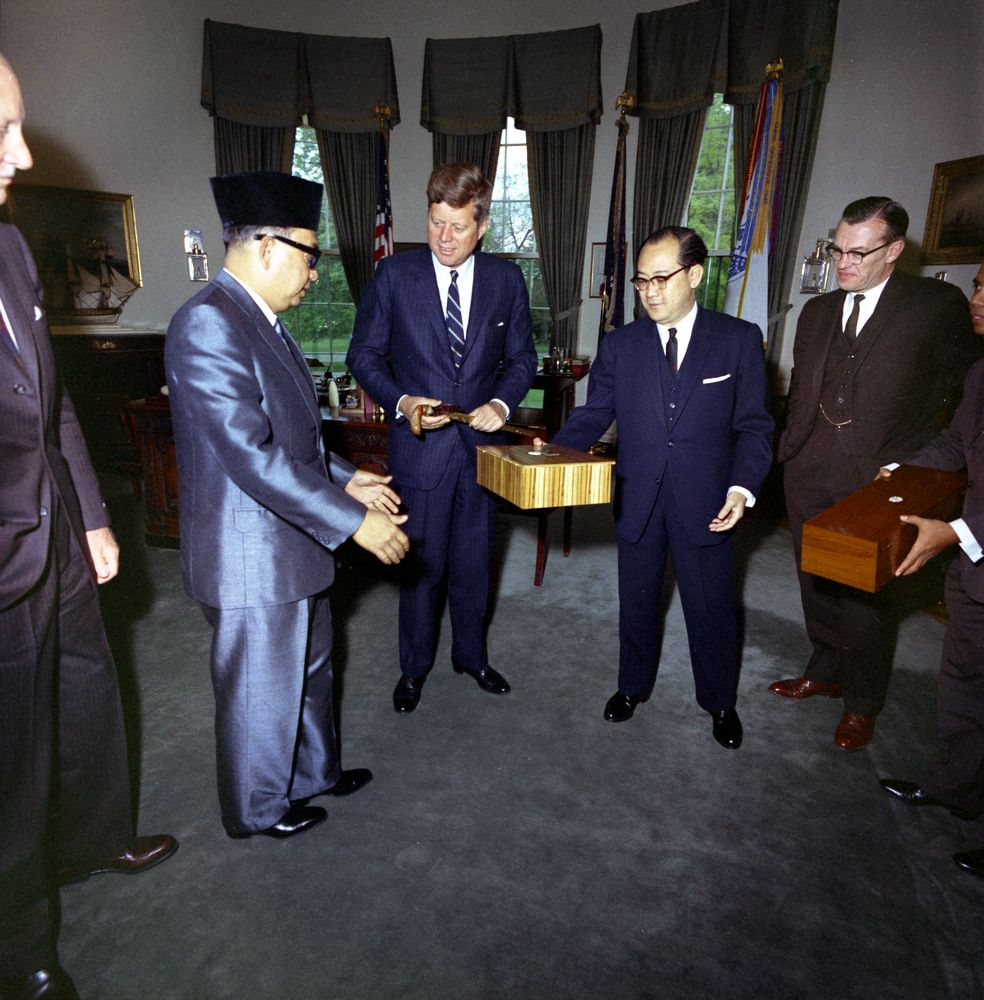
Deputy Prime Minister Tun Abdul Razak with US President John F. Kennedy at the White House in 1961

=== Titles ===
- Malaysia
  - Father of Development (Bapa Pembangunan), (posthumously)
- Pahang
  - Yang DiHormat Orang Kaya Indera Shahbandar ke-10

=== Honours of Malaysia ===
- Malaya
  - Grand Commander of the Order of the Defender of the Realm (SMN) – Tun (1959)
- Malaysia
  - Recipient of the Malaysian Commemorative Medal (Gold) (PPM) (1965)
  - Recipient of the Order of the Crown of the Realm (DMN) (1976)
- Pahang
  - Member 1st class of the Family Order of the Crown of Indra of Pahang (DK I) (1973)
  - Grand Knight of the Order of the Crown of Pahang (SIMP) – formerly Dato', now Dato' Indera (1967)
- Kelantan
  - Recipient of the Royal Family Order (DK)
  - Knight Grand Commander of the Order of the Crown of Kelantan (SPMK) – Dato'
- Kedah
  - Member of the Kedah Supreme Order of Merit (DUK)
- Penang
  - Knight Grand Commander of the Order of the Defender of State (DUPN) – Dato' Seri Utama (1975)
- Sabah
  - Grand Commander of the Order of Kinabalu (SPDK) – Datuk Seri Panglima (1971)
- Perlis
  - Knight Grand Commander of the Order of the Crown of Perlis (SPMP) – Dato' Seri (1965)
- Selangor
  - Knight Grand Commander of the Order of the Crown of Selangor (SPMS) – Dato' Seri (1965)
- Johor
  - Knight Grand Commander of the Order of the Crown of Johor (SPMJ) – Dato' (1961)
- Terengganu
  - Knight Grand Commander of the Order of the Crown of Terengganu (SPMT) – Dato' (1964)
- Perak
  - Knight Grand Commander of the Order of Cura Si Manja Kini (SPCM) – Dato' Seri (1974)
  - Knight Grand Commander of the Order of the Perak State Crown (SPMP) – Dato' Seri (1964)
- Sarawak
  - Knight Grand Commander of the Order of the Star of Hornbill Sarawak (DP) – Datuk Patinggi

=== Foreign honours ===
- Belgium
  - Grand Cross of the Order of the Crown of Belgium (1967)
- Brunei
  - Grand Commander of the Order of Seri Paduka Mahkota Brunei (SPMB) – Dato Seri Paduka (1959)
  - Commander of the Order of Seri Paduka Mahkota Brunei (DPMB) – Dato Paduka (1958)
- Cambodia
  - Grand Officer of the Royal Order of Sahametrei (1962)
- Philippines
  - Grand Collar of the Order of Lakandula (2017)
- United Kingdom
  - Honorary Knight Grand Cross of the Order of St Michael and St George (GCMG) (1972)
  - Associate Knight of the Order of the Hospital of St John of Jerusalem (1967)

=== Namesakes ===
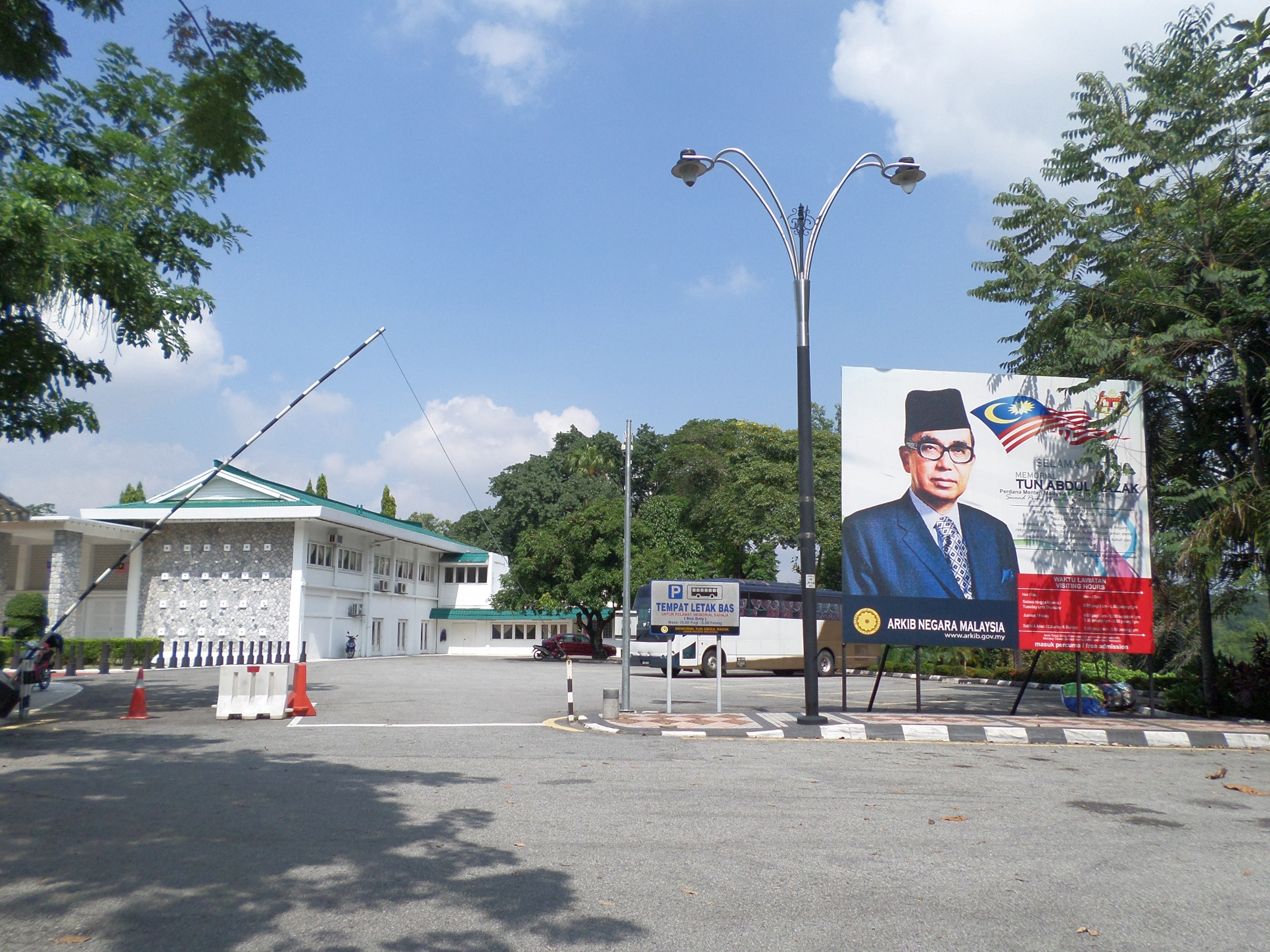
Tun Abdul Razak Memorial in Kuala Lumpur.

Several things were named after him, including:

- Tun Razak Highway (Federal Route 12 connecting Segamat, Johor to Gambang, Pahang)

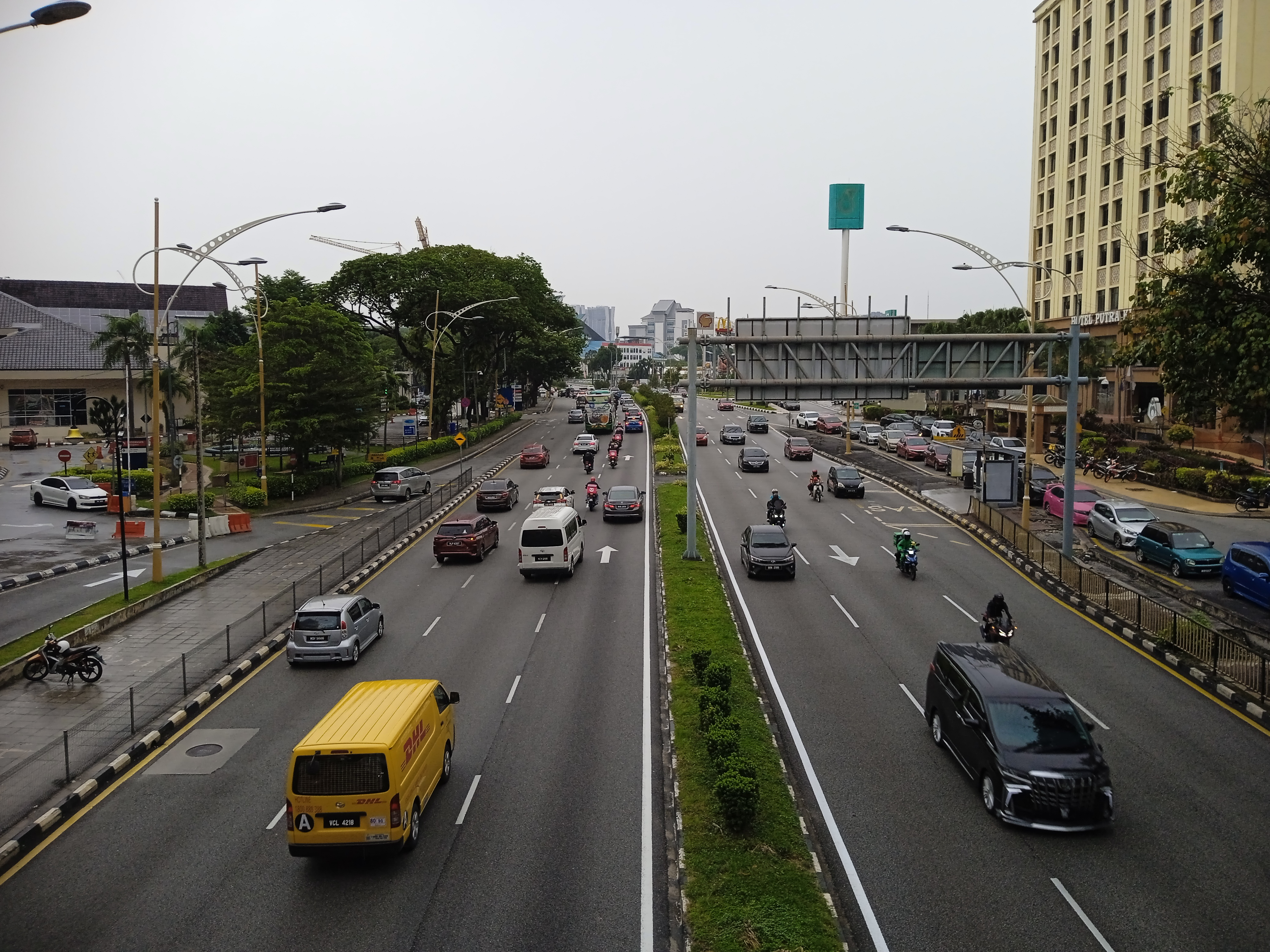
Jalan Tun Razak towards Bulatan Pahang in Kuala Lumpur

- Jalan Tun Razak in Kuala Lumpur (part of Kuala Lumpur Middle Ring Road 1)
- Jalan Tun Abdul Razak in Johor Bahru (part of Skudai Highway)
- Jalan Tun Abdul Razak in Ipoh (also known as Maxwell Road)
- Jalan Tun Abdul Razak in Malacca City (street name for Malacca Bypass)
- Jalan Tun Razak in Kota Kinabalu
- Jalan Tun Abdul Razak in Gowa, Sulawesi Selatan, Indonesia (known as Jalan Hertasning Baru and Jalan Aroepala)
- Jalan Tun Razak in Putrajaya
- Taman Tun Abdul Razak also known as Taman TAR (a residential area in Ampang Jaya, Selangor)
- Desa Tun Razak, a small township in the outskirts of Kuala Lumpur
- Bandar Tun Razak in Kuala Lumpur
  - Bandar Tun Razak LRT station
  - Parliamentary constituency of Bandar Tun Razak
- Bandar Tun Razak, Jengka in Pahang
- Bandar Tun Abdul Razak, Rompin, Pahang
- Komtar Tower in George Town, Penang
- Komtar JBCC in Johor Bahru, Johor
- Komtar Skywalk in George Town, Penang
- SK Tun Abdul Razak, a primary school in Kuala Kubu Bharu, Selangor
- Kampung Tun Abdul Razak, a township in Kuala Kubu Bharu
- Surau Desa Tun Abdul Razak, a prayer hall in Desa Tun Razak, Kuala Lumpur
- Surau Rumah Keluarga Angkatan Tentera Tun Abdul Razak, a prayer hall for Malaysians veteran army in Desa Tun Razak, Kuala Lumpur
- Institut Penyiaran dan Penerangan Tun Abdul Razak, a government broadcasting office in Taman Bukit Angkasa, Kuala Lumpur
- Dewan Terbuka Tun Abdul Razak, a community hall centre in Labu, Negeri Sembilan
- Jalan Tun Abdul Razak, a major road in Kangar, Perlis
- Masjid Tun Abdul Razak Repoh, a mosque in Kangar, Perlis
- Jalan Tun Abdul Razak, a major road in Johor Bahru, Johor
- Jalan Tun Razak, a major road in Alor Setar, Kedah
- Kampung Tun Abdul Razak and Kampung Tun Rahah, a township in honour of Tun Razak and her spouse, Tun Rahah in Bukit Katil, Melaka
- Auditorium Tun Abdul Razak in Balok, Pahang
- Rumah Kelahiran Tun Abdul Razak, a museum of his hometown house in Pekan, Pahang
- Chanselori Tun Abdul Razak, Universiti Malaysia Pahang
- Rumah Penyayang Tun Abdul Razak, a nursing home in Pekan, Pahang
- Sekolah Berasrama Penuh Integrasi, a fully integrated boarding school in Pekan, Pahang
- Jalan Tun Razak, a road in Kuala Kangsar, Perak
- Auditorium Tun Razak, Jalan Kolej Melayu, Kuala Kangsar
- SMK Tun Abdul Razak, a secondary school in Selekoh, Perak
- Sekolah Menengah Kebangsaan Tun Abdul Razak, a secondary school in Kuching, Sarawak
- Tun Abdul Razak Stadium in Bandar Tun Razak, Jengka, Pahang

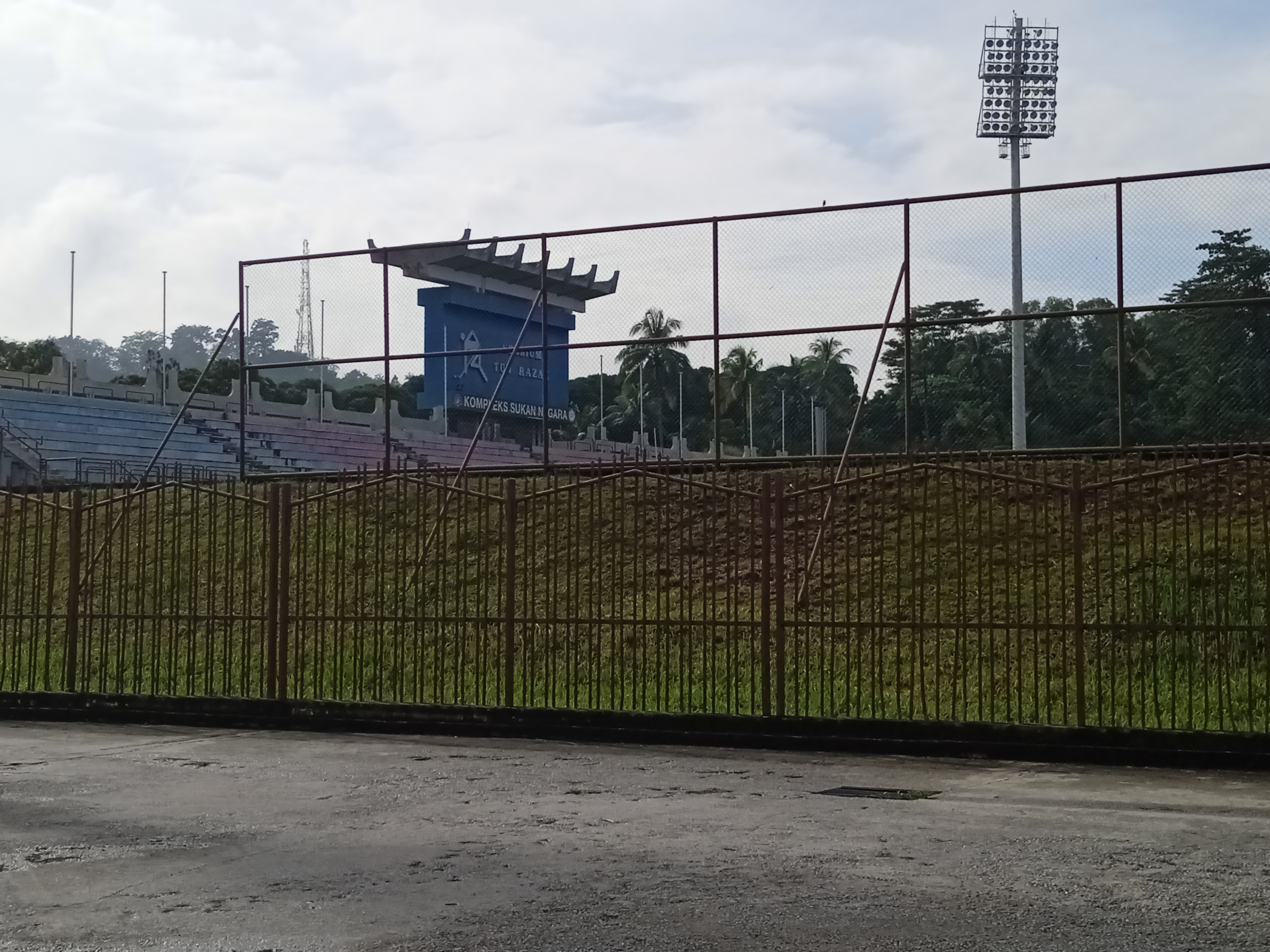
Tun Razak Hockey Stadium (Stadium Hoki Tun Razak) at Taman Duta in Kuala Lumpur

- Tun Razak Hockey Stadium in Kuala Lumpur
- SK Pusat Penyelidikan Pertanian Tun Razak, a primary school in Jerantut, Pahang
- SMK Pusat Penyelidikan Pertanian Tun Razak, a secondary school in Jerantut, Pahang
- Pusat Penyelidikan Pertanian Tun Razak, a scientific research base in Jerantut, Pahang
- Tun Abdul Razak Research Centre (formerly known as British Rubber Producers' Research Association) in Brickendonbury, England
- KD Tun Abdul Razak, a Scorpène-class submarine of the Royal Malaysian Navy
- Tun Abdul Razak Chancellor Hall (DECTAR) at the National University of Malaysia (UKM) in Bangi, Selangor
- Tun Abdul Razak Library (PTAR) at MARA University of Technology (UiTM), Shah Alam, Selangor
- Tun Razak Library, a public library in Ipoh, Perak
- MRSM Tun Abdul Razak, MARA Junior Science College in Pekan, Pahang.
- Bandar Tun Razak, a township in Jengka, Pahang
- Stadium Tun Abdul Razak, a stadium in Jengka Pahang
- Sekolah Berasrama Penuh Integrasi Tun Abdul Razak (InSTAR), an integrated boarding school in Pekan, Pahang
- Sekolah Dato' Abdul Razak (SDAR), all-boys boarding school in Seremban, Negeri Sembilan.
- Universiti Tun Abdul Razak (UNIRAZAK), a private university in Kuala Lumpur.
- Tun Abdul Razak Residential College, one of residential college in Universiti Malaysia Perlis
- Dewan Tun Abdul Razak, Menara Kembar Bank Rakyat in Kuala Lumpur
- Dewan Tun Abdul Razak, a museum exhibition gallery in Kuching, Sarawak Museum
- Dewan Tun Abdul Razak 1 & 2, Putra World Trade Centre, Kuala Lumpur
- Dewan Kenangan Tun Abdul Razak in Baling, Kedah
- Institut Teknologi Tun Abdul Razak in Petaling Jaya, Selangor
- Institut Teknologi Tun Abdul Razak in Perai, Penang
- Tun Abdul Razak Hockey Cup
- Tun Abdul Razak Heritage Park, a public recreational park in Kuala Lumpur
- Tun Abdul Razak Memorial, a memorial in Kuala Lumpur
- Kem Tun Razak, a military camp in Bayan Lepas, Penang
- Tun Razak Chair at Ohio University's Department of Southeast Asian Studies
- Tun Razak Exchange
  - Tun Razak Exchange MRT station in Kuala Lumpur
- Tun Razak Tower in Kuala Lumpur
- Universiti Tun Abdul Razak, formerly known as SIDMA College, Kota Kinabalu, Sabah
- Perpustakaan Tun Abdul Razak, a public library of UiTM Kota Kinabalu Branch
- Kolej Tun Abdul Razak, a residential college at Universiti Malaysia Perlis, Arau, Perlis
- Kolej Tun Abdul Razak and Kolej Toh Puan Abdul Razak, residential colleges at Universiti Teknologi MARA, Bukit Besi, Terengganu
- Kolej Tun Abdul Razak, a residential college at Universiti Teknologi MARA, Machang, Kelantan
- Kolej Tun Razak, a residential college at Universiti Teknologi Malaysia, Skudai, Johor

== In popular culture ==
Motion picture & television

- Malaysian actor Naa Murad N played in 2007 film 1957: Hati Malaya
- FFM Award Winning actor Rusdi Ramli portrayed Razak in 2013 film Tanda Putera and won his second FFM for Best Leading Actor.
- Malaysian actor Abdul Manan Sulaiman in 2015 film, Kapsul

Stage/Theatre

- FFM nominee Rashidi Ishak portrayed Razak in 2009 local theatre production Tun Razak in Istana Budaya.

== Notes ==
Political offices
New office	Deputy Prime Minister of Malaysia; 1957–1970	Succeeded by Ismail Abdul Rahman
Preceded by Abdul Rahman	Prime Minister of Malaysia; 1970–1976	Succeeded by Hussein Onn
