= Kempas =

- Suburb of Johor Bahru
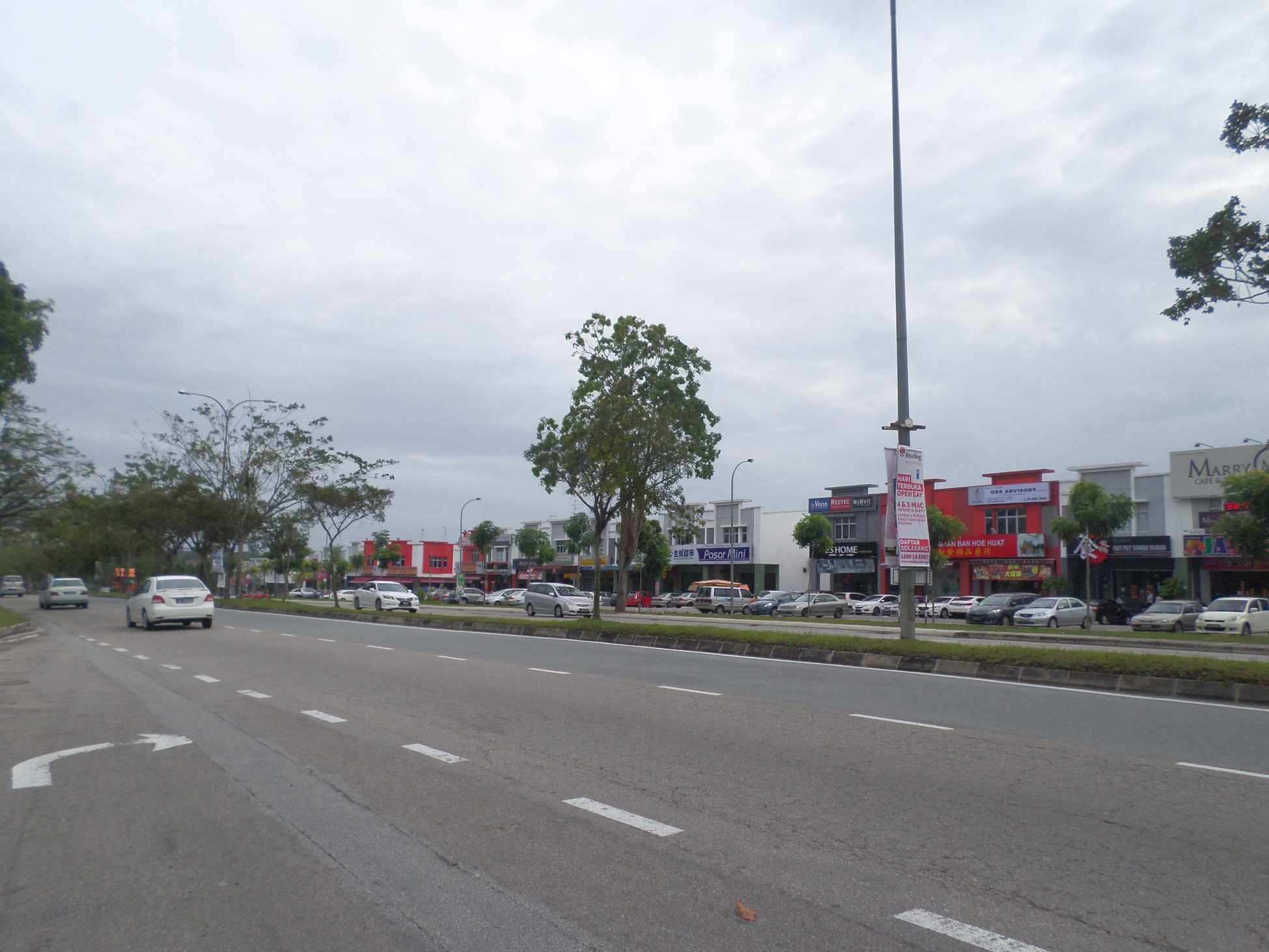
- Street at Kempas
- Interactive map of Kempas
- Coordinates: 1.5287669°N 103.70570522°E
- Country: Malaysia
- State: Johor
- District: Johor Bahru
- City: Johor Bahru
- Time zone: MST

Kempas is a suburb and administrative zone in Johor Bahru, Johor, Malaysia. It is bordered by six other planning zones: Tampoi to the southwest, Bandar Baru Uda to the south, Larkin to the southeast, Kangkar Tebrau to the east, Bandar Dato' Onn to the northeast and Impian Emas to the northwest.

Kempas is largely suburban but with some industrial facilities in two main areas; Kawasan Perindustrian Maju jaya near Impian Emas and Taman Perindustrian Tampoi near the border with Larkin. Since 1 August 2024, It is the location of the new headquarters of the department of social welfare(JKM) in Johor. Additionally, it hosts several medical or medical-adjacent facilities including a government psychiatric hospital, a government medical college and Johor's public health department.

== Politics ==
As an administrative zone in the Johor Bahru City Council, Kempas has a councillor appointed by the state government. Abd Rashid Kasman, a member of UMNO, is the most recent to hold this position.

Most of Kempas is located within the eponymous state constituency of Kempas which is mandated to return a single assemblyman to the Johor State Legislative Assembly. Kawasan Perindustrian Maju Jaya is instead part of the state constituency of Skudai. Kempas has been mostly held by UMNO since it was first contested in 1995, though between 2018 to 2021, former UMNO party member Osman Sapian won the seat as a member of BERSATU, later becoming the 16th Menteri Besar of Johor, and held it until his death in December 2021. It has been represented since 2022 by UMNO member Ramlee Bohani.

The state constituency of Kempas is part of the larger federal constituency of Pulai which is mandated to return a single member to the Dewan Rakyat, the lower house of Malaysia's Parliament. Though it has long been held historically by UMNO, since 2018 Pulai has been held by AMANAH and is currently represented by Sulahaizan Kayat.

== Housing ==
Though most of Kempas's residences are low-density private houses, there is also a significant number of high-density public housing meant to serve as affordable housing in the area and ongoing talks to expand this initiative further on vacant federal land.

== Transportation ==
The Kempas Baru railway station sits in the north of Kempas. In February 2024, it was relocated to a new building in order to accommodate the Gemas-Johor Bahru Electrified Double Track Project(EDTP). The station connects Kempas by passenger rail to several cities in Malaysia including KL, Butterworth and Padang Besar as well as Johor Bahru's city center. Additionally, freight lines connect the station to the industrial port areas of Pasir Gudang and Tanjung Pelepas.

Several of Bus Muafakat Johor's lines also pass through kempas: route P104, route P112 and route P113. Route P113 starts at the bus terminal in Larkin Sentral and stops by at the JKM headquarters to cater to lower-income commuters.
