= Taman Damansara Aliff =

Township in Johor Bahru, Johor, Malaysia

Bandar Damansara Alif is a major township in the city of Johor Bahru, Johor, Malaysia. This township is located between Tampoi and Bandar Baru UDA.
