= SMK Bandar Baru UDA =

Sekolah Menengah Kebangsaan Bandar Baru UDA

Location
- Jalan Padi Ria 1 Bandar Baru UDA; Johor Bahru, Johor Darul Ta'zim, 81200; Malaysia
- Coordinates: 1°29′50″N 103°43′6″E

Information
- School type: Secondary school
- Motto: Berilmu, Berwibawa, Berbakti (Knowledgeable, Authoritative, Serve)
- Opened: December 1, 1994
- Status: Open
- School district: Johor Bahru
- Principal: ENCIK MOHAMED KHAIRUL BIN MOHAMED AMIN
- Classes: Upper Form: DLP; STA; KAA; SK; EKON 1; EKON 2; DIGITAL; PSV 1; PSV 2; PSV 3; Lower Form: UM; UITM; KAA; USM; UKM; UPM; UTM; UUM; UIAM; UMS
- Houses: Puma; Cheetah; Jaguar; Leopard
- Song: Menuju Era Gemilang
- Nickname: SMKBBU
- Yearbook: Bitara
- Feeder schools: Sekolah Kebangsaan Kompleks UDA; Sekolah Kebangsaan Bandar UDA (2)
- Website: smkbbu.edu.my

SMK Bandar Baru UDA or Sekolah Menengah Kebangsaan Bandar Baru UDA is the main secondary school in Bandar Baru UDA, Johor Bahru, Johor, Malaysia. The school is located near Masjid Jamek Bandar Baru UDA. This school is one of the most prestigious school in Malaysia

== History ==
Sekolah Menengah Kebangsaan Bandar Baru UDA (SMKBBU) was established in 1994 and began admitting students for the schooling session on November 30, 1994. A total of 384 Form 1 students and 166 Form 2 students registered at this coeducational school. Due to the unfinished school building, all school administration was conducted at Sekolah Menengah Kebangsaan Tasek Utara. Until April 17, 1995, school management was carried out in the new building (at SMKBBU) after approval from the Johor Bahru District Public Works Department, which only permitted the use of the Amanah and Bakti blocks. All teaching of stream subjects such as science and life skills was conducted in classrooms only, as the Science labs and Life Skills workshops were still under construction. SK Kompleks UDA and SK Bandar Uda (2) are the two main feeder schools. The residential areas of the students are predominantly in Bandar Baru UDA (BBU), Taman Skudai Kanan, Kampung Skudai Kiri, Kampung Muafakat, and Kempas. The socio-economic status backgrounds of the families of SMKBBU students vary.
