= Jalan Datin Halimah =

Road in Malaysia

Johor Route 3

Major junctions
- North end: J3 Kempas Highway; FT 3374 Jalan Tampoi; FT 1 Skudai Highway
- South end: Dataran Bandaraya; Johor Bahru Inner Ring Road

Location
- Country: Malaysia
- Primary destinations: Larkin, Johor Bahru

Highway system
- Highways in Malaysia; Expressways; Federal; State

Jalan Datin Halimah (Johor State Route J3) or Jalan Kolam Ayer is a major road in Johor Bahru, Johor, Malaysia. It was named after wife of Menteri Besar of Johor Dato' Onn Jaafar, Datin Halimah.

== Junction lists ==
The entire route is located in Johor Bahru District, Johor.

Legend:

- I/C - Interchange, I/S - Intersection, RSA - Rest and service area, OBR - Overhead bridge restaurant, R/R - Restaurant and rest plaza, L/B - Layby, V/P - Vista point, TN - tunnel, T/P - Toll plaza, BR - Bridge
- C - Cloverleaf, S - Stack, T-A - Trumpet-A, T-B - Trumpet-B, DT - Directional-T/Y, SDT - Semi-Directional-T/Y, P-Y - Partial-Y, D - Diamond, P-C - Partial cloverleaf, D-D - Diverging diamond, D-R - Direct ramp

Km	Exit	Name	Destinations	Notes
Through to J3 Kempas Highway
	7	Jalan Tampoi I/C	FT 3374 Jalan Tampoi – Tampoi, Bandar Damansara Alif, Kampung Melayu Majidee, Kota Tinggi	Diamond interchange
	L/B	BH Petrol L/B	BH Petrol	North bound
		Cheshire Home		Southbound
		Jalan Petaling	Jalan Petaling – Jalan Langkasuka, Kampung Melayu Majidee, Larkin	T-junctions
		Jalan --		T-junctions
		Start/End of dual carriageway		
		Nippon Paint factory		
		Institut Kemajuan Ternakan Ayam		
		Jalan Kelang	Jalan Kelang – Kampung Aman	T-junctions
		Jalan Taruka	Jalan Taruka – Institut Kemahiran Mara, Bandar Baru UDA	T-junctions
		Percetakan Nasional Malaysia Berhad		
		Kampung Aman		
		Datin Halimah's Condomunium		
		Sekolah Menengah Kebangsaan Perempuan (ERT)		
		Kompleks Kraftangan Johor		
	L/B	Petron L/B	Petron	Northbound
		Kampung Dato' Onn		T-junctions
		Sultan Ismail Library		T-junctions
		Maktab Perguruan Temenggong Ibrahim (MPTI)	Maktab Perguruan Temenggong Ibrahim (MPTI); Jalan Cenderawasih – Jalan Langkasuka, Kampung Melayu Majidee, Larkin	Junctions
		Start/End of dual carriageway		
		Larkin Sentral	Jalan Kenyalang – Larkin Sentral	T-junctions
		Jalan Tun Abdul Razak Susur	Jalan Tun Abdul Razak Susur – Bandar Baru UDA, City Centre, Woodlands (Singapore)	
		Skudai Highway	FT 1 Skudai Highway – Senai International Airport, Skudai, Tampoi, Royal Johor Country Club (RJCC), City Centre, Woodlands (Singapore); North–South Expressway Southern Route / AH2 – Kuala Lumpur	Cloverleaf interchange
		Jalan Tasek Utara	Jalan Tasek Utara – Jalan Abdul Samad, Jalan Yahya Awal, Jalan Abdul Rahman Andak, Hutan Bandar (City Forest), Kompleks Penyiaran Sultan Iskandar	T-junctions
		Kompleks Penyiaran Sultan Iskandar		
		Taman Merdeka		North bound
		Bulatan Kolam Ayer	Istana Bukit Serene	Roundabout
		Kampung Kolam Ayer		T-junctions
		Kampung Nong Chik	Jalan Nong Chi – Kampung Nong Chik, Jalan Abdul Samad, Restoran Anjung Warisan	T-junctions
		Aloha Towers Condomunium		
		Maktab Sultan Abu Bakar		
		Jalan Sungai Chat	Jalan Sungai Chat – Tepian Tebrau food court, Sungai Chat food court, City Centre	T-junctions
		Maktab Sultan Abu Bakar		
		Jalan Thompson	Jalan Thompson – City Centre	Junctions
		Mawar Johor		
		Dataran Bandaraya		
		Hyatt Regency Johor Bahru		
		Johor Bahru Inner Ring Road	FT 188 Johor Bahru Inner Ring Road – Jalan Abdul Samad, Kulai, Kota Tinggi, Stulang, Woodlands (Singapore); J1 Iskandar Coastal Highway – City Centre, Tampoi, Skudai, Danga Bay, Nusajaya, Senai International Airport; North–South Expressway Southern Route / AH2 – Kuala Lumpur, Malacca; Jalan Mahmoodiah – Mahmoodiah Royal Mausoleum	Junctions
