= Johor Bahru Inner Ring Road =

Road in Malaysia

Coordinates: 1°28′24.3″N 103°45′40.2″E

Federal Route 188
- Johor Bahru Inner Ring Road (Jalan Lingkaran Dalam)
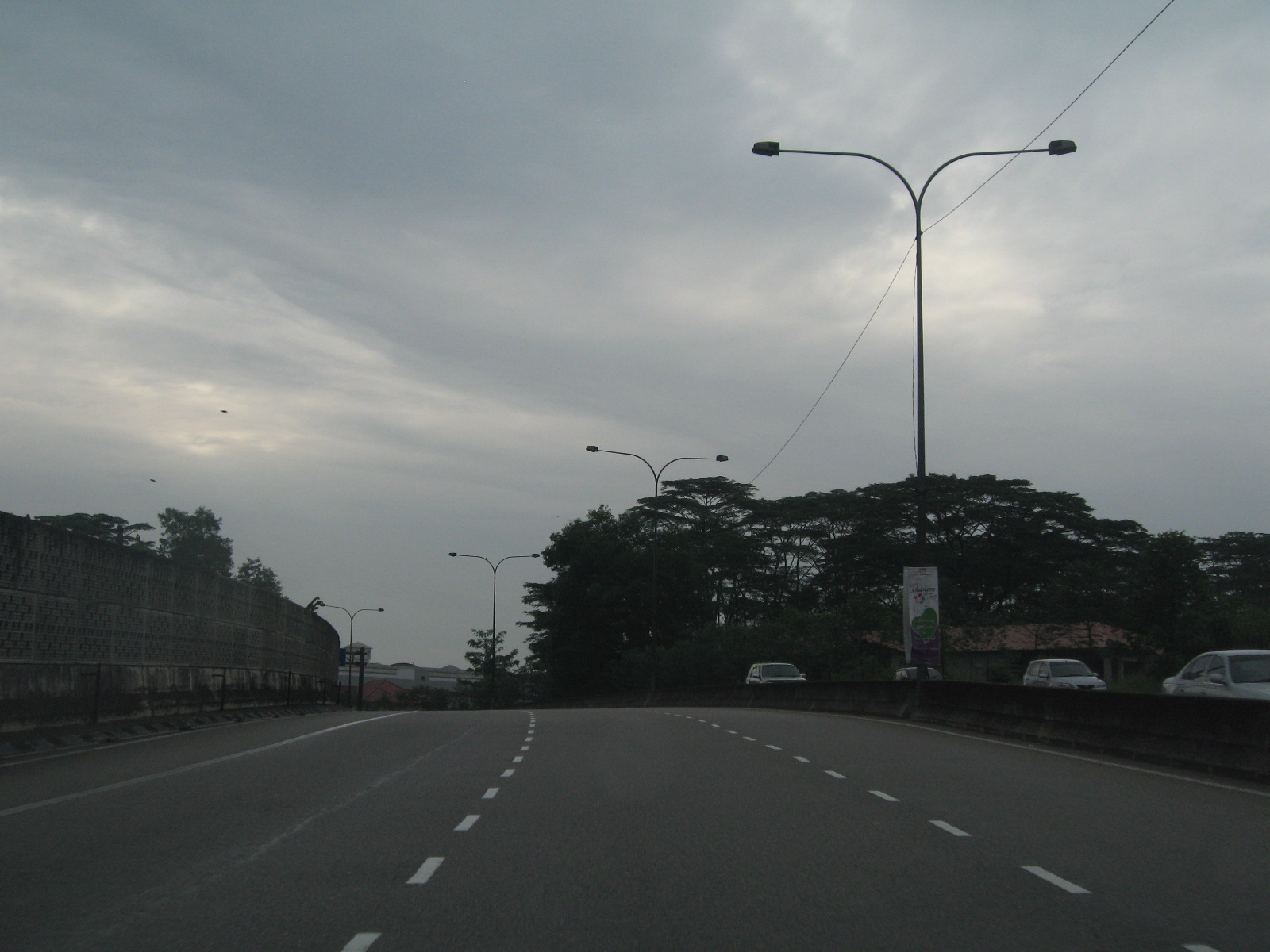

Route information
- Maintained by Malaysian Public Works Department
- Length: 4.81 km (2.99 mi)
- Existed: 1996–present
- History: Completed in 2001

Major junctions
- Southwest end: Dataran Bandaraya Interchange
- J1 Iskandar Coastal Highway; Jalan Yahya Awal; FT 1 Skudai Highway FT 3 / AH18 Tebrau Highway; Johor Bahru Eastern Dispersal Link Expressway / AH2; J5 Johor Bahru East Coast Parkway; Jalan Tanjung Puteri; Jalan Ibrahim Sultan
- Southeast end: Stulang; Jalan Ibrahim Sultan Interchange

Location
- Country: Malaysia
- Primary destinations: Woodlands (Singapore)

Highway system
- Highways in Malaysia; Expressways; Federal; State

Johor Bahru Inner Ring Road, (JBIRR) or Jalan Lingkaran Dalam, Federal Route 188, is a multi-lane federal ring road controlled-access highway that circles the Johor Bahru Central District in Johor, Malaysia. The 4.6-kilometre (2.9 mi) highway was the most expensive road infrastructure project per kilometre of its time in the country.

The Kilometre Zero of the Federal Route 188 starts at Jalan Abu Bakar junctions near Dataran Bandaraya.

== History ==
Johor Bahru Inner Ring Road commenced construction in 1996 with the objective of diverting traffic not destined for the centre of the city to bypass it through the ring road that connects all four arterial highways and major roads leading into the area.

The construction was divided into three phases:

=== Phase 1 ===
From the Tanjung Puteri Customs Complex/Jalan Sultan Ibrahim to Jalan Tebrau (Tebrau Highway), this 500-metre section links the Malaysia-Singapore commercial vehicles customs complex to Tebrau Highway, one of the two major arterial highways into the city. This 6 to 8 lane section comprised two ground-level traffic-light- controlled intersections with provisions for future tri-level interchange, and a two-level interchange with provision for future tri-level interchange. This phase was opened to traffic in 1998.

=== Phase 2 ===
This 600 metre elevated section from Jalan Tebrau (Tebrau Highway) to Jalan Abdul Rahman Andak (named after Abdul Rahman Andak) comprises only one interchange, 25 metres high, roughly equivalent to a four-storey building. It links Tebrau Highway to Jalan Tun Abdul Razak (Skudai Highway) near Plaza Best World. The tri-level interchange was the tallest traffic interchange at the time of construction in Malaysia. This phase was opened to traffic in 1999.

=== Phase 3 ===
This 3.5 kilometre section runs from Jalan Abdul Rahman Andak to Jalan Tun Dato Ismail near the City Square clock tower, or Dataran Bandaraya Johor Bahru. It comprises four ground level traffic-lights controlled intersections with provisions for future dual or tri-level interchanges. This phase was opened to traffic after multiple delays in 2001.

== Features ==
At most sections, the Federal Route 188 was built under the JKR R5 road standard, allowing maximum speed limit of up to 90 km/h.

Traffic interchanges at Jalan Sultan Ibrahim and Jalan Lumba Kuda merges to Southern International Gateway known as Sultan Iskandar Building.

A flyover on Tebrau Highway Interchange was constructed during the middle of 2006 and became operational to the public on 15 December 2007.

== Interchange lists ==
The entire route is located in Johor Bahru District, Johor.

Legend:

- I/C - Interchange, I/S - Intersection, RSA - Rest and service area, OBR - Overhead bridge restaurant, R/R - Restaurant and rest plaza, L/B - Layby, V/P - Vista point, TN - tunnel, T/P - Toll plaza, BR - Bridge
- C - Cloverleaf, S - Stack, T-A - Trumpet-A, T-B - Trumpet-B, DT - Directional-T/Y, SDT - Semi-Directional-T/Y, P-Y - Partial-Y, D - Diamond, P-C - Partial cloverleaf, D-D - Diverging diamond, D-R - Direct ramp

Location	km	mi	Exit	Name	Destinations	Notes
Dataran Bandaraya; Dataran Bandaraya Flyover	0.0	0.0	18801	Dataran Bandaraya I/C	J1 Iskandar Coastal Highway – Skudai, Senai International Airport, Kulai, Iskandar Puteri, Danga Bay, City Centre, Hospital Sultanah Aminah , Masjid Negeri Sultan Abu Bakar, Istana Besar	Trumpet interchange
Dataran Bandaraya; Dataran Bandaraya Flyover			–	Dataran Bandaraya		Eastbound
Dataran Bandaraya; Dataran Bandaraya Flyover			18802	Kolam Ayer I/C	J3 Jalan Datin Halimah – Larkin, Kempas; Jalan Mahmoodiah – Muslim Cemetery, Mahmoodiah Royal Mausoleum	Diamond interchange
Johor Bahru			–	Jalan Abdul Samad	Jalan Abdul Samad – Sedap Corner	Eastbound
Johor Bahru			–	Jalan Petri	Jalan Petri – Muslim cemetery, Jalan Mahmoodiah	Westbound
Johor Bahru			18803	Mahmoodiah I/C	Jalan Wirawan – Jalan Mariamah; Jalan Mahmoodiah – Muslim cemetery, Mahmoodiah Royal Mausoleum	Diamond interchange with tunnel
Johor Bahru			18804	Jalan Yahya Awal I/C	Jalan Yahya Awal – Jalan Tasek Utara, Hutan Bandar; Jalan Ayer Molek – Bangunan KWSP, Bangunan Tabung Haji	Diamond interchange
Johor Bahru			18805	Jalan Tun Abdul Razak I/C	FT 1 Skudai Highway – Kulai, Senai International Airport, Skudai, Tampoi, Iskandar Puteri, City Centre, JB Sentral; North–South Expressway Southern Route / AH2 – Kuala Lumpur, Malacca	Single-point urban interchange
Johor Bahru			18806	Tebrau Highway I/C	FT 3 / AH18 Tebrau Highway – Mersing, Kota Tinggi, Bandar Sri Alam, Pasir Gudang, City Centre, JB Sentral	Stack diamond interchange
Johor Bahru			–	Muzium Tokoh Johor	Muzium Tokoh Johor	Eastbound
Johor Bahru			Shell Layby (westbound)			
Johor Bahru			–	Jalan Storey	Jalan Storey	Westbound
Johor Bahru			18807	CIQ flyover CIQ I/C	Johor Bahru Eastern Dispersal Link Expressway / AH2 – Kuala Lumpur, Malacca, Senai International Airport, Bandar Dato' Onn, Setia Tropika; Sultan Iskandar Building – Touch 'n Go Immigration Customs; AH2 Johor Causeway – Woodlands, Singapore City; J5 Johor Bahru East Coast Parkway (Jalan Stulang Laut – Permas Jaya, Pasir Gudang	Multi-level stacked diamond interchange
Johor Bahru	4.0	2.5	–			
Johor Bahru	4.6	2.9	18808	Jalan Ibrahim Sultan I/C	Jalan Tanjung Puteri – City Centre; Jalan Ibrahim Sultan – Stulang, ZON Duty Free Complex	T-junctions
1.000 mi = 1.609 km; 1.000 km = 0.621 mi: Incomplete access

== See also ==
- Transport in Malaysia
