= Kempas Highway =

Road in Malaysia

Johor Route 3

Route information
- Maintained by PLUS Malaysia Berhad with its subsidiary Projek Lebuhraya Usahasama Berhad (Former concessionaries known as Projek Lebuhraya Utara Selatan Berhad (PLUS))
- Existed: 1992–present
- History: Completed in 1994

Major junctions
- North end: J105 Jalan Kempas Lama
- J105 Jalan Kempas Lama; Jalan Kempas Denai; FT 17 Pasir Gudang Highway; FT 3374 Jalan Tampoi; J3 Jalan Datin Halimah
- South end: FT 3374 Jalan Tampoi

Location
- Country: Malaysia
- Major cities: Senai, Pasir Gudang, Tampoi, Larkin, Johor Bahru

Highway system
- Highways in Malaysia; Expressways; Federal; State

Kempas Highway or Jalan Kempas (Johor State Route J3) is a major highway in Johor Bahru, Johor, Malaysia. It is the only state road in Malaysia constructed as a two-lane highway by an expressway concessionaire company, PLUS Expressway Berhad as a part of the North–South Expressway project. Kempas Highway was built to provide access to Johor Bahru from North–South Expressway Southern Route via Exit 255 Kempas Interchange.

== Route background ==
The Kilometre Zero of Kempas Highway starts at Jalan Kempas Lama junctions.

At most sections, the State Route J3 was built under the JKR R5 road standard, allowing maximum speed limit of up to 90 km/h.

There are no alternate routes or sections with motorcycle lanes.

== Junction lists ==
The entire route is located in Johor Bahru District, Johor.

Legend:

- I/C - Interchange, I/S - Intersection, RSA - Rest and service area, OBR - Overhead bridge restaurant, R/R - Restaurant and rest plaza, L/B - Layby, V/P - Vista point, TN - tunnel, T/P - Toll plaza, BR - Bridge
- C - Cloverleaf, S - Stack, T-A - Trumpet-A, T-B - Trumpet-B, DT - Directional-T/Y, SDT - Semi-Directional-T/Y, P-Y - Partial-Y, D - Diamond, P-C - Partial cloverleaf, D-D - Diverging diamond, D-R - Direct ramp

Km	Exit	Name	Destinations	Notes
0.0	1	Jalan Kempas Lama I/S	J105 Johor State Route J105 – Skudai, Tampoi, Kampung Maju Jaya, Senai, Senai International Airport; North–South Expressway Southern Route / AH2 – Kuala Lumpur, Malacca, Johor Bahru, Woodlands (Singapore)	T-junctions
	2	Setia Tropika I/S	Jalan Setia Tropika Utama – Setia Tropika, Johor state Ministry of Home Affairs Complex	T-junctions
	BR	Railway crossing bridge		
	3	Taman Kempas I/S	Taman Kempas	T-junctions
	4	Kampung Kempas I/S	Jalan Kempas Denai – Tampoi, Taman Johor, Taman Munshi Ibrahim, Hospital Permai Johor Bahru; Jalan Permatang 8 – Kempas Baru railway station KTM ETS	Junctions
	L/B	Petronas L/B	Petronas TnG TAG Hub	Northbound
		Masjid Kempas		North only
	L/B	Petronas L/B	Petronas	Southbound
		The Southern Hospital		North only
	L/B	Shell L/B	Shell	Northbound
		Masjid Baru Kempas		North only
	5	Kempas-Pasir Gudang Highway I/C	FT 17 Pasir Gudang Highway – Kulai, Senai International Airport, Skudai, Bandar Sri Alam, Pasir Gudang, Kota Tinggi Second Link Expressway / AH143 – Nusajaya, Tuas	Diamond interchange
	6	Kempas Industrial Area I/S	Kempas Industrial Area	Junctions
	7	Jalan Tampoi I/C	FT 3374 Jalan Tampoi – Tampoi, Bandar Damansara Alif, Kampung Melayu Majidee, Kota Tinggi	Diamond interchange
Through to J3 Jalan Datin Halimah
