= Saleng =

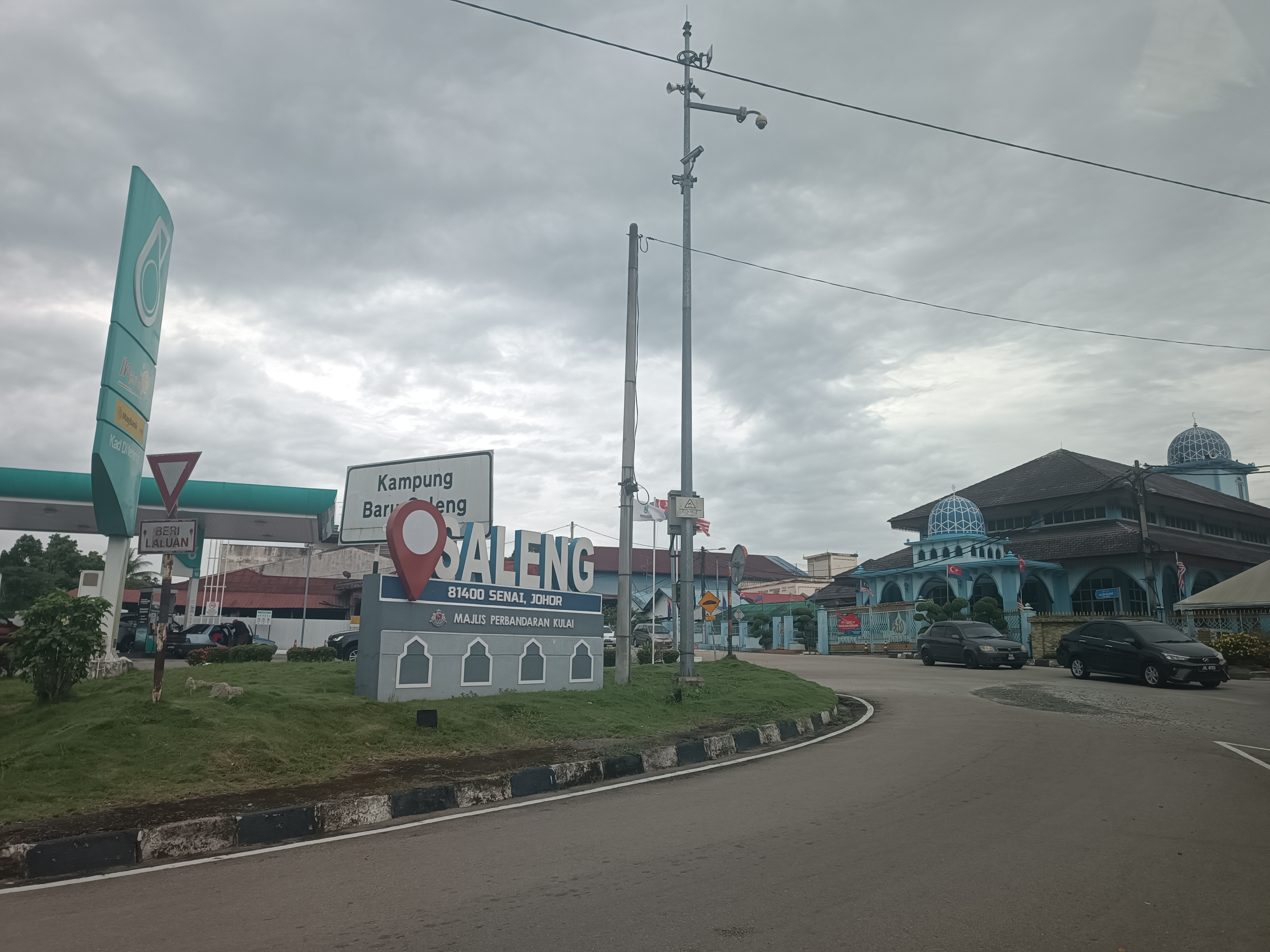

- Location within Malaysia
- Coordinates: 1°38′00″N 103°38′00″E
- Country: Malaysia
- State: Johor
- Local Authorities: Majlis Perbandaran Kulai (MPKu, Kulai Municipal Council)
- Elevation: 36.88 m (121.0 ft)

Population
  - Total: Senai Saleng = 92,223
- Time zone: UTC+8 (MST)
  - Summer (DST): Not observed

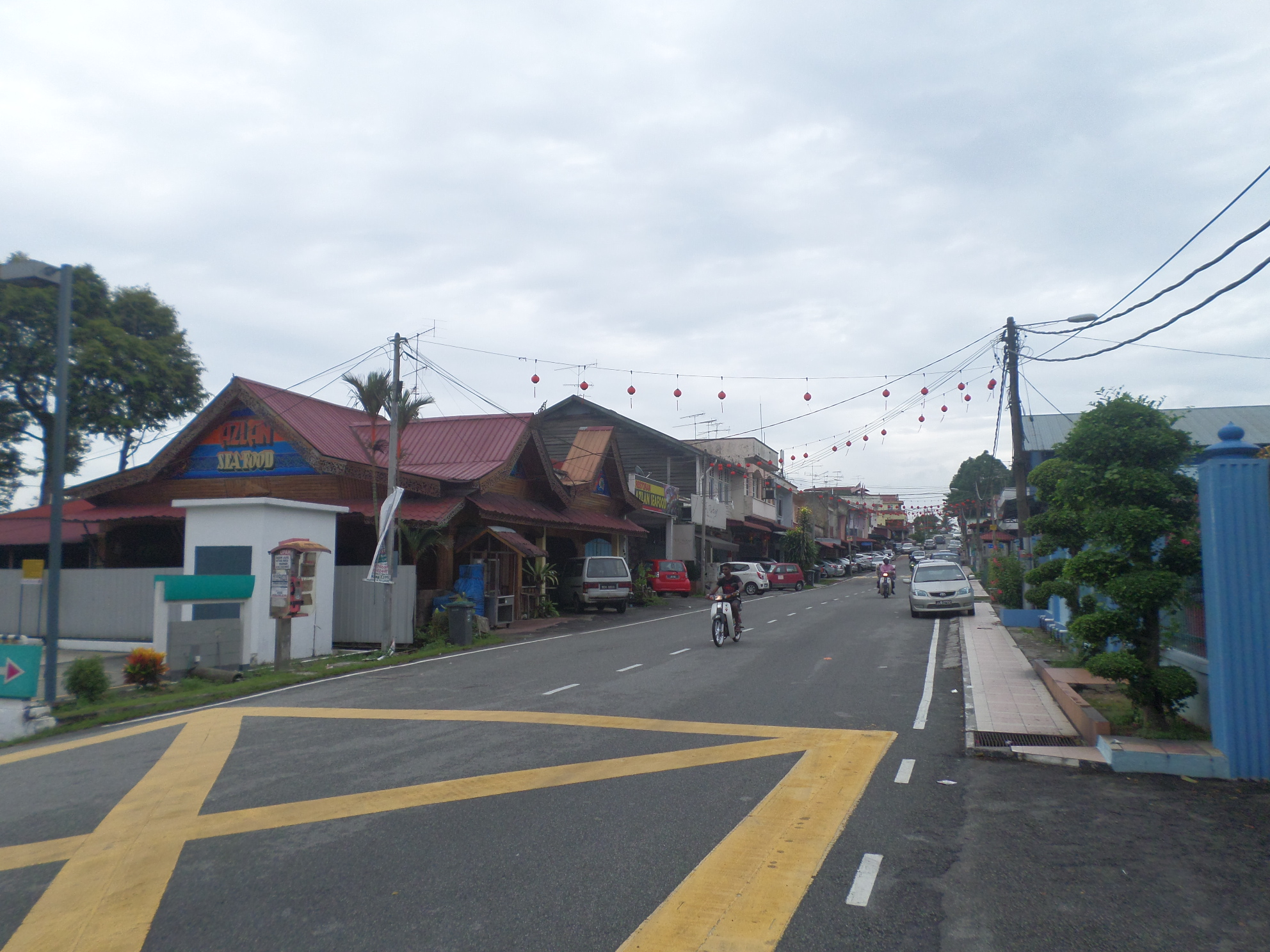
Saleng

Saleng is a town in Kulai District, Johor, Malaysia.

== History ==
Saleng developed from a small new village named (Kampung Baru) into a small town with many new development projects and a township plan.

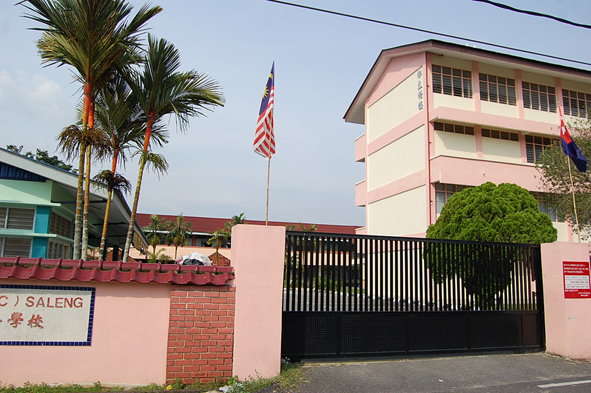
Saleng Chinese Primary School

== Demography ==
Saleng has a primary school(S.J.K(C)Saleng), a shopping mall, a famous masjid jamek, and a 24-hours fastfood restaurant. Federal Route 1. Foon Yew High School Kulai Campus and Johor Multimedia Super Corridor (MSC) are also near the town.

== Administration ==
Saleng is administered by Pejabat Daerah Kulaijaya and Kulai Municipal Council.

== Population ==
Primary ethnic groups: Malay, Chinese, Indian. Most of the residents are Chinese, the Chinese community speaks mainly the Hakka dialect.

== Transportation ==
=== Road ===
The town is accessible by bus from Johor Bahru Sentral railway station (7B, 777, 777B, A1, BET1, JPO1, S&S 7) or Larkin Sentral (2, 13, 777, 888, JPO1) in Johor Bahru. It is also accessible by Muafakat Bus route P-401.
