= Tun Abdul Razak Memorial =

Residence in Kuala Lumpur, Malaysia

Coordinates: 3.1418°N 101.6870°E

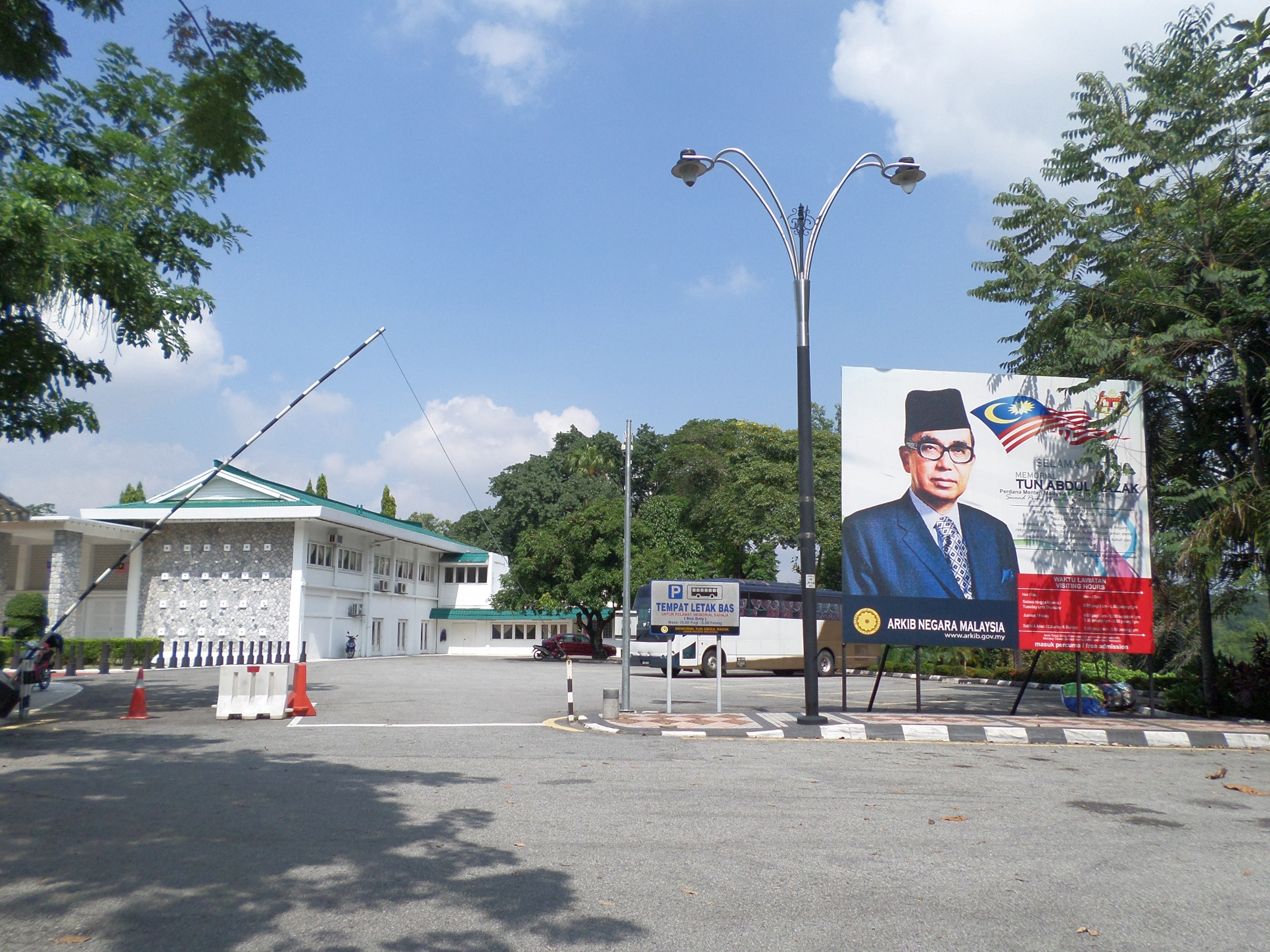
In front of memorial, 2016

The Tun Abdul Razak Memorial is an official residence building of Tun Abdul Razak in Kuala Lumpur, Malaysia which was originally known as the Sri Taman Building. This building was later turned into a museum to commemorate his services and was inaugurated by Prime Minister Mahathir Mohamad on 6 May 1982. Tun Abdul Razak had lived in this building since 1962 until he died in January 1976.

== Exhibition ==
This memorial displays materials belonging to Tun Abdul Razak himself and also materials related to him.

The entire exhibition is divided into two parts. The first part is the exhibition at Bangunan Sri Taman which exhibits about 650 materials and can be categorized into three large groups namely archive materials, museum materials, and library materials. All materials are displayed according to certain headings, including Biography, Personalities, Defense, Lessons, Gifts and Souvenirs, Social, Politics, Development, Foreign Affairs, Religious Activities, Return to Rahmatullah and Tun Razak Foundation. In addition to photographs and documents, his and his family's personal belongings are also on display.

The second part displays about 1580 materials about Tun Abdul Razak's involvement and activities during his tenure as Minister and Prime Minister of Malaysia. The materials are displayed according to specific titles. Apart from the exhibition materials, there are also multimedia presentations as additional information to visitors. There is also an example of a FELDA House on display on the outside of the building. Next, this memorial provides facilities to visitors such as a library and research room as well as a souvenir shop.
