= Komtar Skywalk =

Bridge in George Town, Malaysia

KOMTAR Skywalk
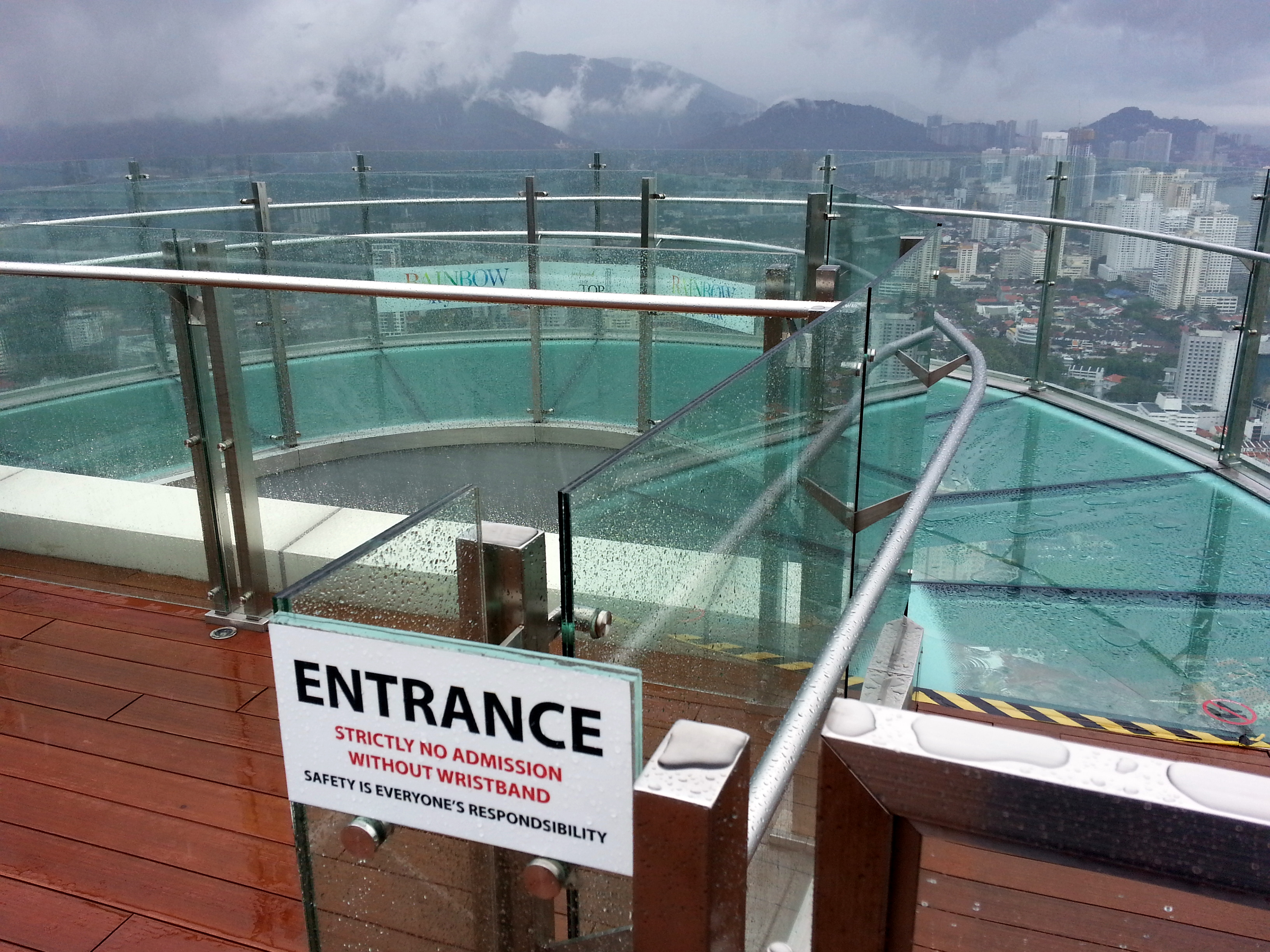
- Coordinates: 5°24′52.3938″N 100°19′46.45″E
- Carries: Pedestrian
- Locale: George Town, Penang, Malaysia
- Official name: Rainbow Skywalk
- Owner: Only World Group
- Website: thetop.com.my

Characteristics
- Design: Curved pedestrian cantilever glass bridge
- Material: Glass
- Total length: 16 metres (52 ft)
- Height: 248.7 m (816 ft)

History
- Constructed by: Only World Group
- Construction end: 2016
- Opened: 18 December 2016

The Komtar Skywalk is the highest outdoor glass sky walk in Malaysia. It is located at the top of Komtar, the tallest skyscraper in George Town, Penang. The horseshoe-shaped cantilever bridge with a glass walkway sits at an elevation of 248.7 metres (816 ft) above ground.

Launched in 2016, the Komtar Skywalk, also known as the Rainbow Skywalk, was part of the major facelift of Komtar undertaken by Only World Group, a local private limited firm specialising in food and beverages.

The U-shaped 16 metre-long glass walkway offers visitors an unimpeded panoramic view of the cityscape of George Town, its surrounding suburbs such as Tanjung Tokong, Pulau Tikus and Air Itam, and the Penang Hill.

== Design and construction ==
In 2012, Only World Group (OWG) was awarded the RM50 million project to revitalise Komtar, which until then had been largely seen as a white elephant. This major renovation effort was aimed to rejuvenate Komtar as a tourist attraction in George Town, and included the construction of a banquet hall, a sky lounge at the 65th floor and an international-themed restaurant at the summit of the skyscraper. These new tourist attractions are collectively known as 'The Top'.

The U-shaped Komtar Skywalk is situated at the newly added 68th floor of Komtar, which also elevated the skyscraper's height to 248.7 metres (816 ft). The Komtar Skywalk is similar in construction to the Grand Canyon Skywalk, in that both bridges use the same heat-treated and temper-proofed laminated glass. The Penang-based Universiti Sains Malaysia also ran an array of pendulum, wind and vibration tests on the glass, which was designed to withstand the load of 16 adults.

In addition, three high-speed bubble lifts were installed along Komtar's facade, one of which connects level 59 with the 68th floor. While the bubble lifts were originally designed with a transparent glass wall to allow for a panoramic view of George Town on the way up, the lifts were then completely concealed in 2016 in accordance with safety advice by the Department of Occupational Safety and Health.

The Komtar Skywalk was opened to the public on 18 December 2016 in a ceremony attended by the CEO of OWG, Richard Koh, and the Chief Minister of Penang, Lim Guan Eng.

== Access ==
The Komtar Skywalk can be accessed between 11am and 10pm daily. The standard entry fares for Malaysians and foreigners are as follows.

Category	Non-Malaysian (RM)	Malaysian (RM)
Adult	68	48
Children	48	28
Disabled	48	28

== See also ==
- Komtar
