= Majidee Malay Village =

Village in Johor, Malaysia

Coordinates: 1.5110314°N 103.7416077°E

- Village in Johor Bahru
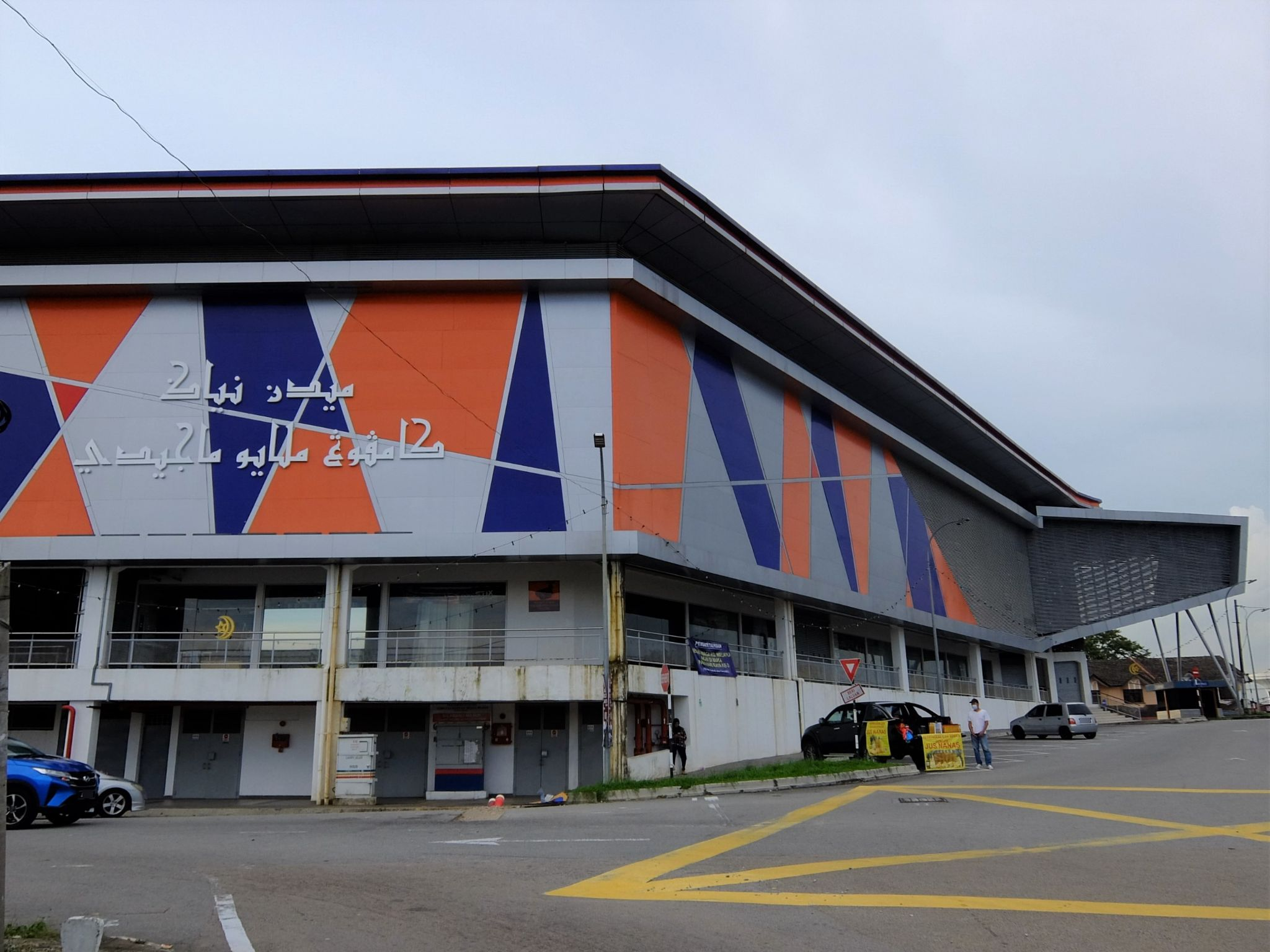
- Majidee Malay Village Market
- Interactive map of Majidee Malay Village
- Country: Malaysia
- State: Johor
- District: Johor Bahru
- City: Johor Bahru

Population (2015)
  - Total: 30,000
- Postcode: 81100

Majidee Malay Village (Malay: Kampung Melayu Majidee; Jawi: کامڤوڠ ملايو مجيدي) is a Malay village located in the city of Johor Bahru, Johor, Malaysia.

The village is known by locals of Johor Bahru as a major culinary hub due to its high concentration of restaurants and food courts.

== Geography ==
It is situated on a hilly area near Sungai Sebulong, connecting to Sungai Pandan on the coast of the Straits of Tebrau. It spans over an area of 7.3 km^{2}.

== History ==
Its history stretches back to the 15th century, which includes involvement in Portuguese settlements cleared by the legendary "Six Friends", the new settlement by the people of the heritage family that is related to the family from Pergam Istana Buruk in Muar. They were originally from the old Sultanates of the Kingdom of Johor Lama and Melaka, the Demak Sultanate of Kudus, the Siam Sultanate, the Kelantan 7-tombs, the Hassan, the Sultan of Johor Temenggong Daeng Ibrahim, the British Army, and the Johor Military Force (JMF).

Kampung Melayu Majidee and several other villages were used by the British authorities to accommodate their soldiers, which gave the village the name "majidee", which was used for a large constituency for the security forces for the front line, camp, and battalions to guard the royal family's bank between the mouth of Sungai Pandan and Sungai Skudai.

== Economy ==
Although the early settlers were the pensioners and merchants, trading activities had a strong presence in the village since the 1950s. Its economy depends on its harbors, resorts, and tourist attractions, for tourists heading to and from Johor Bahru, the World Heritage Site at Tanjung Puteri, Johor River coast to the east, and Muar's geology and landforms to the north.

== Demographics and culture ==
It is the largest and most populous settlement area with a Malay population, followed by Kampung Baru in Kuala Lumpur, the capital city of Malaysia. Its population is mostly Malay and Javanese.

Economically, it is surrounded by developments for Johor Bahru. Kampung Melayu Majidee is enjoying the state capital's resources for humanitarian developments and township infrastructures.

== Transportation ==
=== Road ===
The North–South Expressway's southern exit point in Johor Bahru Interchange connects Kampung Melayu Majidee from the direction of Ulu Tiram.

Kg. Melayu Majidee is flanked by major roads which link to the city.

- Jalan Tebrau on the east which links Johor Bahru to the east coast of Johor.
- Jalan Tampoi on the north which links part of Jalan Tebrau towards Skudai to the west.
- Jalan Stulang Baru on the southwest which links part of Jalan Tebrau towards Larkin Jaya to the west.
- There are two infamous main roads in Kg. Melayu Majidee. They are the Jalan Rahmat and Jalan Merdeka. There are several other main link roads such as the Jalan Sekolah, Jalan Utama, Jalan Masjid and Jalan Kenangan . Jalan Masjid links to Jalan Rahmat, while Jalan Merdeka links to Jalan Kenangan. Depending on which direction one approaches, those roads intersect each other.
- The first platform of the prelude junctions come with a traffic light that leads to the first four-junctions. It is located right at the tip of the hill with its edge downhill on towards Jalan Rahmat as one approaches from the town's wet market and Johor Bahru. Adjacent to it is the mosque. As one turns to the right, he enters Jalan Merdeka and into the second platform's prelude junction.
- While the second platform's prelude junctions consist of a small roundabout, it spreads out to four other roads. If one approaches from Jalan Merdeka, to the left it goes down to the link road to Jalan Rahmat; going forward towards Jalan Kenangan and directed to Jalan Stulang Baru; and to the right at 3 o'clock turn may lead one to Jalan Hujung.
- The first entrance from Jalan Tebrau is Jalan Utama. During the early stages of Kampung Melayu's settlement period, that area were supposedly to be developed into the pekan, or town. Jalan Utama is supposedly to become Kampung Melayu's main entrance road. Since the initial plan changed, Jalan Utama became an ordinary linkage road to Jalan Rahmat but remained important.
