= Setia Tropika =

- Town in Johor, Malaysia
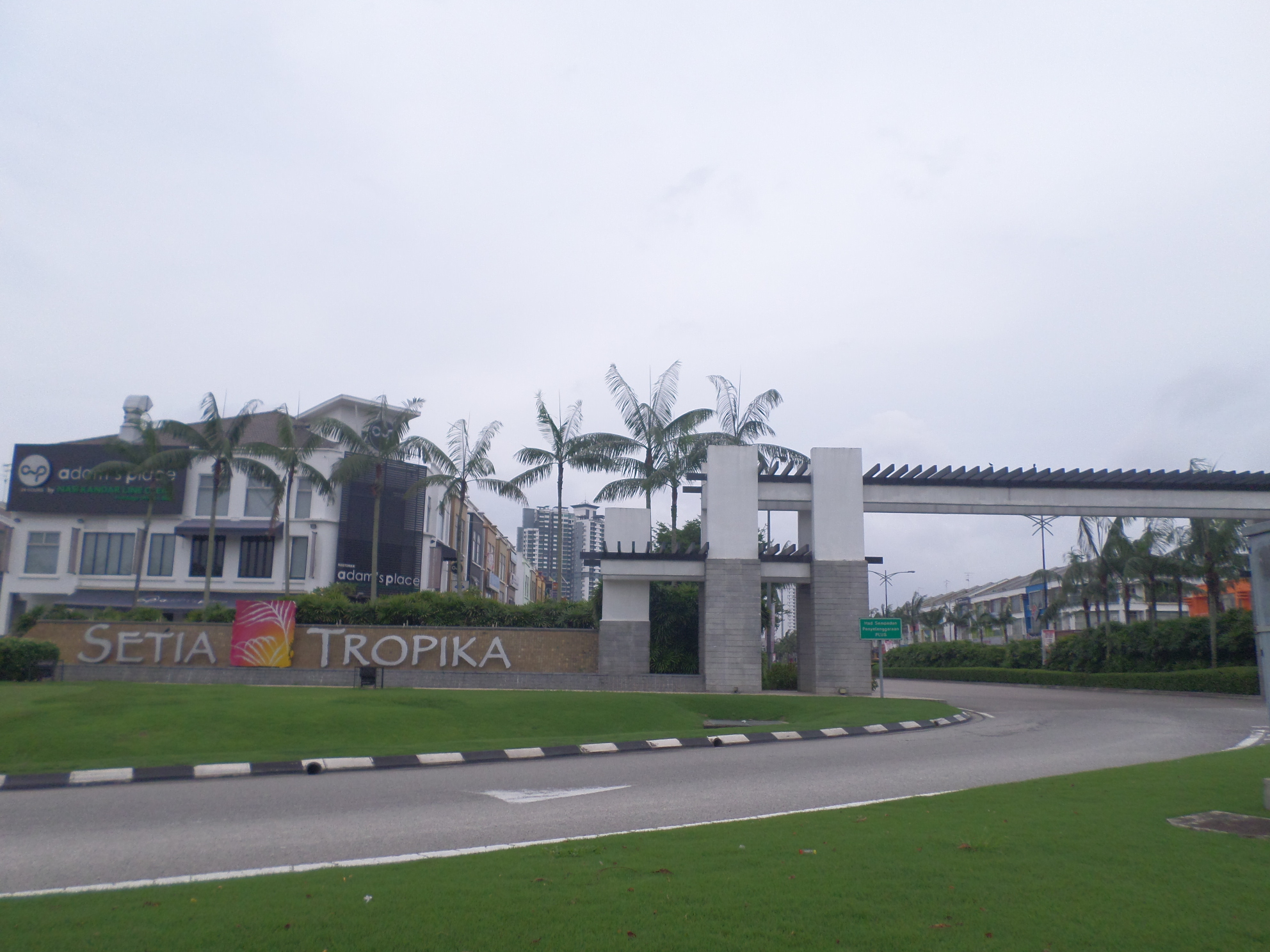

- Map showing Setia Tropika in Johor and Malaysia Setia Tropika (Malaysia)
- Coordinates: 1°32′37.9″N 103°43′33.2″E
- Country: Malaysia
- State: Johor
- District: Johor Bahru District
- Local government: Johor Bahru City Council
- Time zone: UTC+8 (Malaysian Standard Time)
- Postal code: 80xxx
- Area code: +6-07
- Vehicle registration plates: J

Setia Tropika is a township in Johor Bahru, Johor, Malaysia. It is owned by Setia Homes, a member of S P Setia Berhad.
