= Bandar Baru UDA Jamek Mosque =

Mosque in Johor Bahru, Johor, Malaysia

- Masjid Jamek Bandar Baru UDA
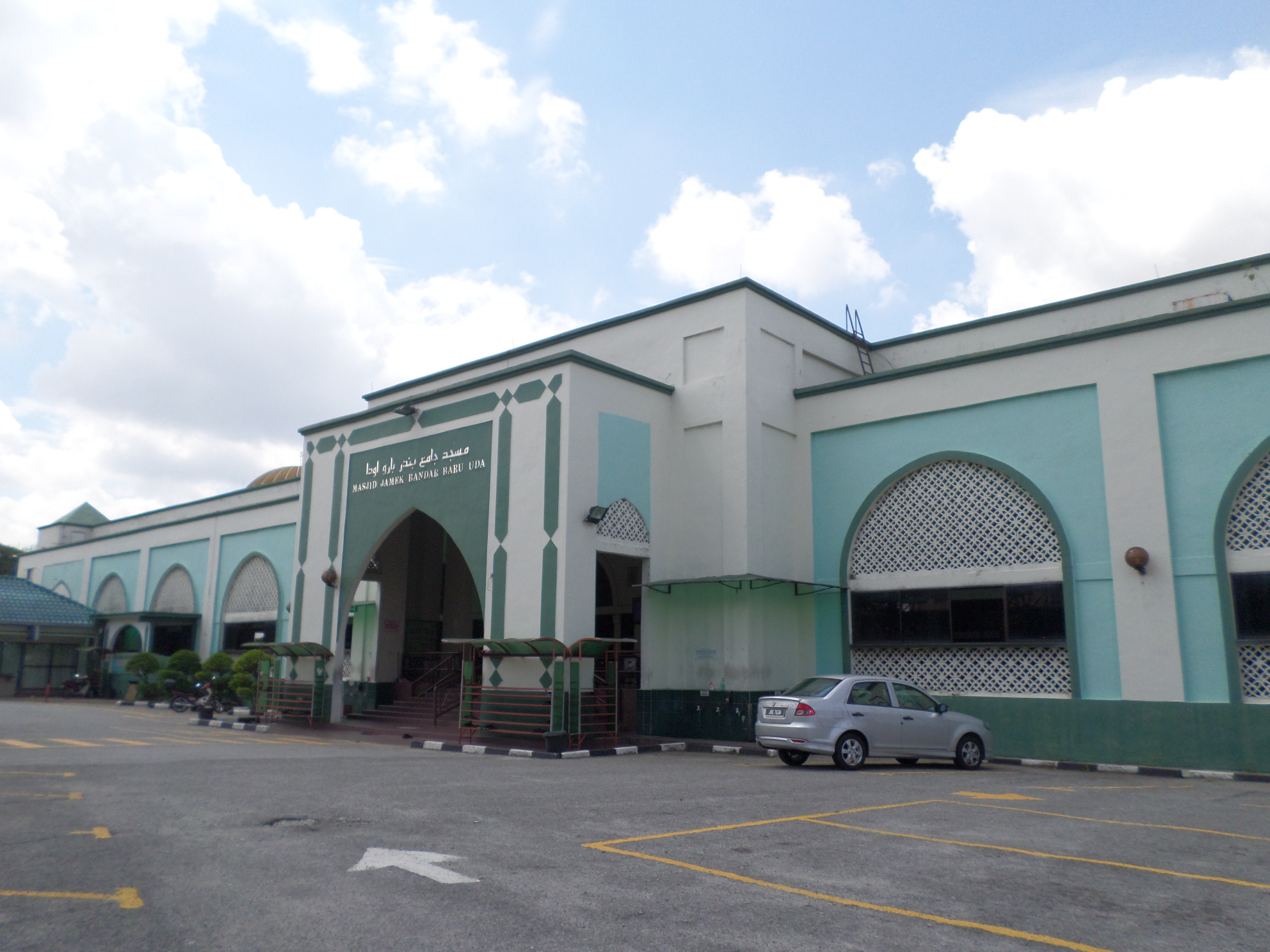

- Location within Johor

Religion
- Affiliation: Islam
- Branch/tradition: Sunni

Location
- Location: Johor Bahru, Johor, Malaysia
- Interactive map of Bandar Baru UDA Jamek Mosque
- Coordinates: 1°30′N 103°43′E

Architecture
- Type: mosque

The Bandar Baru UDA Jamek Mosque (Malay: Masjid Jamek Bandar Baru UDA) is a main mosque in Bandar Baru UDA in Johor Bahru, Johor, Malaysia.

== See also ==
- Islam in Malaysia
