= Bandar Baru UDA =

- Suburb
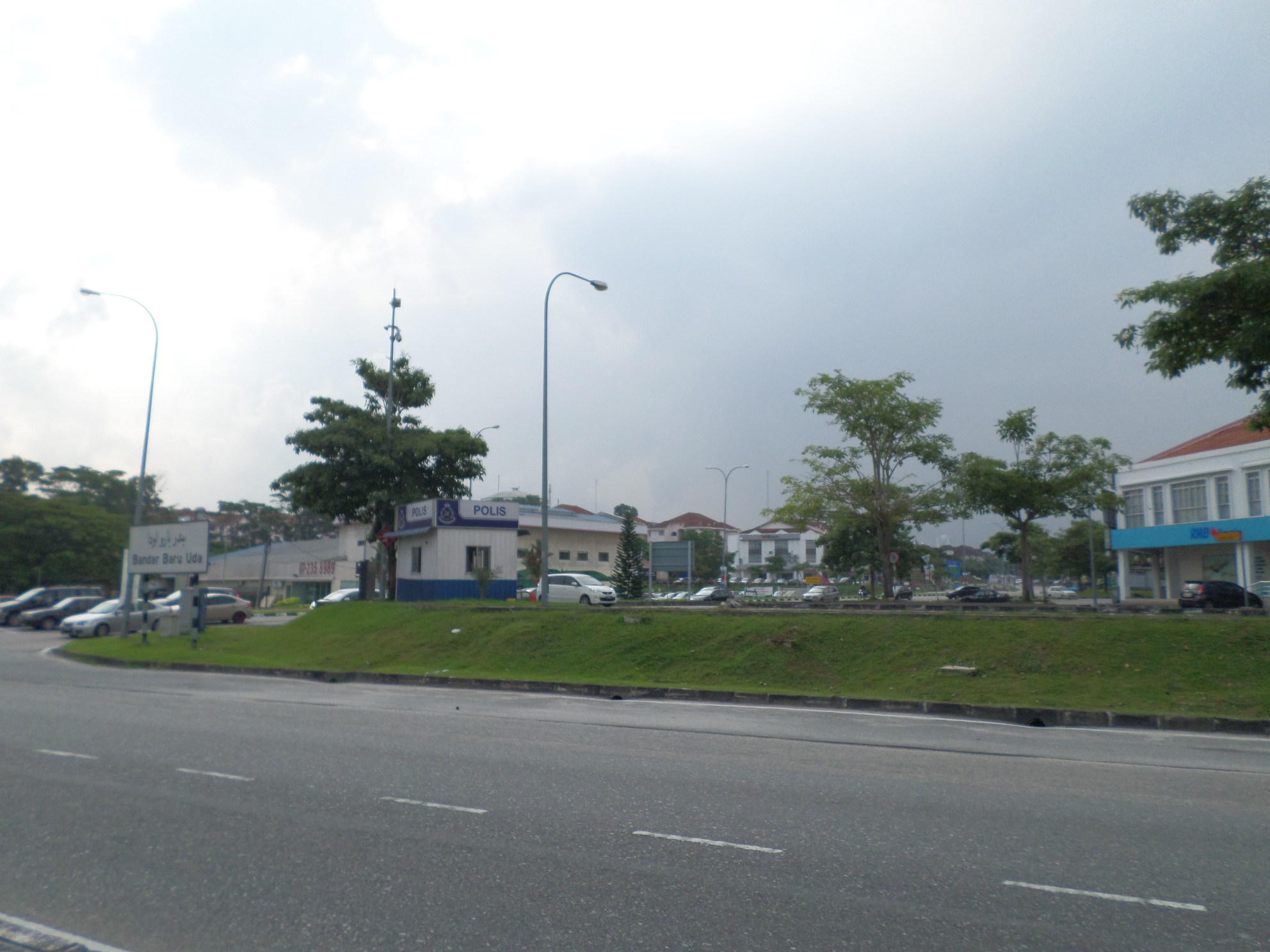
- Intersection between Jalan Tampoi (foreground) and Jalan Padi Mahsuri (background).
- Interactive map of Bandar Baru UDA
- Coordinates: 1°29′49″N 103°42′53.3″E
- Country: Malaysia
- State: Johor
- District: Johor Bahru
- City: Johor Bahru
- Time zone: UTC+8 (MST)
  - Summer (DST): Not observed
- Postal code: 81750
- Website: mbjb.gov.my

Bandar Baru UDA is a suburb in Johor Bahru, Johor, Malaysia. It mainly consists of four phases where this townships has developed well and strategically located in the middle of Johor Bahru Town and transportation. The main population of this town is Malay.

Most of those staying at the terrace houses are professionals and higher middle class Malays. However, there are small portion of rich people living in the bungalows areas, as well lower middle class population staying in the flats.

== Education ==
It has two primary schools (Sekolah Kebangsaan Bandar Uda (2) and Sekolah Kebangsaan Kompleks Uda) as well as a secondary school, Sekolah Menengah Kebangsaan Bandar Baru UDA.

== Transportation ==
The suburb is accessible by Causeway Link bus services T30, T31, T32, T33 and JPO1 from Johor Bahru Sentral Bus Terminal. and bus services 2, T40, T50, 96, P104 and P211 from Larkin Sentral.

== See also ==
- Bandar Baru UDA Jamek Mosque
