= Tampoi, Johor =

Tampoi
- Suburb of Johor Bahru

Other transcription(s)
  - Jawi: تامڤوي
  - Chinese: 淡杯; Dànbēi
  - Tamil: தம்போய் Tampōy (Transliteration)
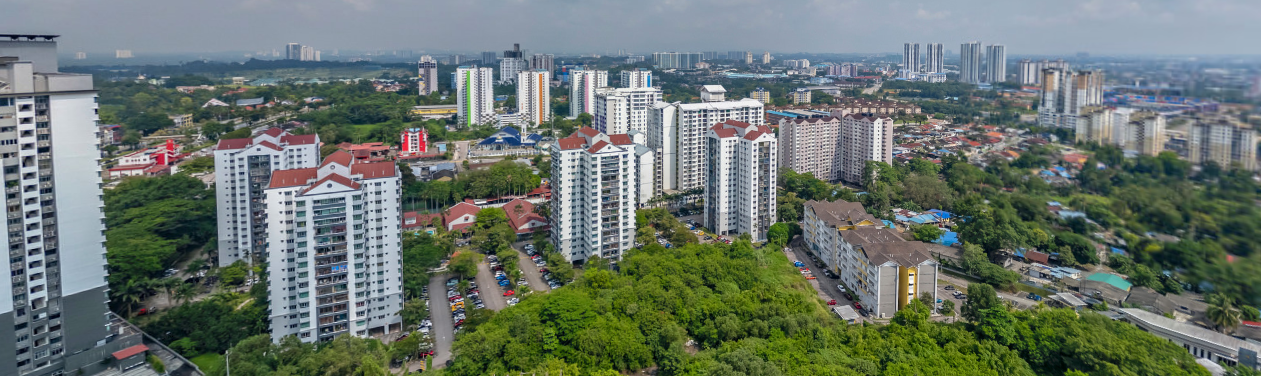
- Tampoi skyline

- Tampoi shown within Johor Bahru. Tampoi (Peninsular Malaysia) Tampoi (Malaysia)
- Coordinates: 1.4927758°N 103.7059348°E
- Country: Malaysia
- State: Johor
- District: Johor Bahru
- City: Johor Bahru
- Time zone: UTC+8 (MST)
- Postcode: 81200
- Dialling code: +607
- Police: Tampoi
- Fire: Johor Bahru

Tampoi is a suburb of Johor Bahru, Johor, Malaysia, about 8 km from Johor Bahru. Its economy is primarily based on light industry factories.

== Geography ==
The suburb spans over an area of 9.58 km^{2} (3.70 sq mi).
