= Larkin Sentral =

Bus station in Johor Bahru, Malaysia

Coordinates: 1°29′44.7″N 103°44′33.7″E

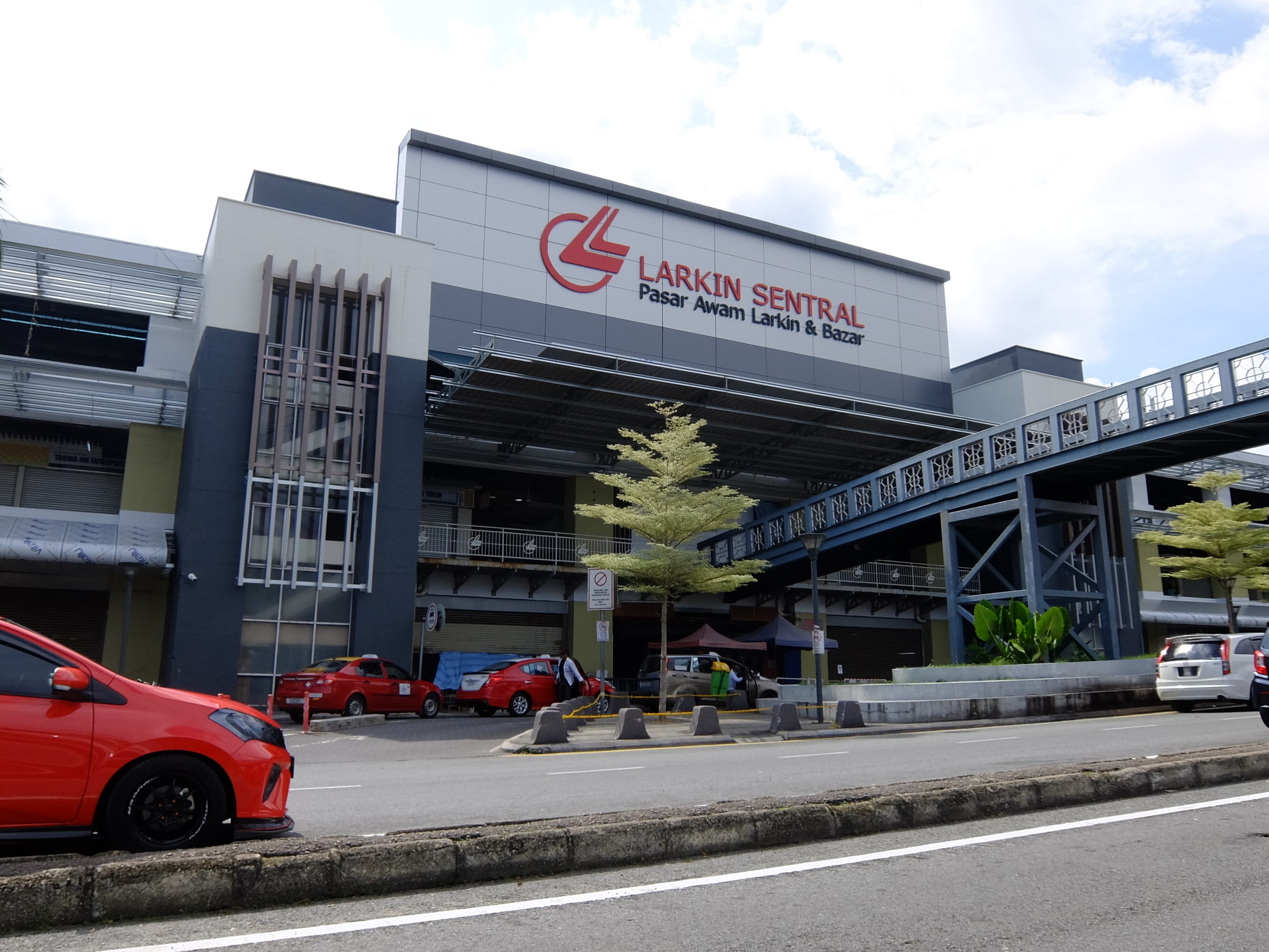

General information
- Location: Jalan Kenyalang, Johor Bahru, Johor, Malaysia
- Owner: Larkin Sentral Property Berhad (subsidiary of Wakaf An-Nur Corporation Berhad)

Other information
- Website: https://www.larkinsentraljb.com.my/

History
- Opened: 1 January 1996; 30 years ago
Location

The Larkin Sentral (formerly Larkin Bus and Taxi Terminal) is a bus terminal located in Johor Bahru, Johor, Malaysia. It has direct bus services to and from many cities and towns in Peninsular Malaysia, Singapore and Hat Yai in Thailand. This T-shaped terminal has three levels and about 50 bus bays.

Also combined with a wet market, the terminal is located near Larkin Stadium. The terminal is connected to the nearby Jalan Tun Abdul Razak.

== History ==
Originally known as Larkin Terminal, the terminal was jointly built by the Johor Bahru City Council and Lion Group of Companies in 1995 at a cost of RM 15 million. The terminal began operations on 1 January 1996. The terminal is four times the size of the Jalan Terus terminal at the city centre, located 5 kilometres away. After the opening of Larkin Terminal, the Jalan Terus terminal became a food centre.

At opening time, the terminal had 56 ticketing counters, 18 tour agent booths, 46 shops, a bank, post office, a clinic and two fast food restaurants.

Larkin Sentral received RM 10 million to upgrade their facilities which will be completed on 2016.

== Transportation services ==
=== Intercity express bus ===
The terminal serves mainly intercity bus services from Johor Bahru to various places in Peninsular Malaysia especially to Melaka, Seremban, Kuala Lumpur, Ipoh, Penang, Kota Bharu and other towns and cities. Express bus services to other towns in Johor like Batu Pahat, Muar and Mersing is also available here.

Online ticketing system is accepted in this terminal although one need to exchange tickets to terminal-type ticket by a small fee. Entry to bus departure/arrival areas is limited to valid ticket holders only.

=== Local bus ===
The terminal also serves local buses to various places in Johor Bahru and surrounding areas, with services goes up to Pontian, Ayer Hitam and Kota Tinggi. Shuttles to Johor Bahru Sentral train station and the city centre is also available from the terminal.

Local public buses in Johor Bahru currently accept cashless payments such as Visa card, NFC using smartphone or smartwatch, and QR code payment, making it the first Malaysian city to support contactless payment using smart devices on urban bus network.

=== Cross-border services ===
The terminal also locates various cross border transports to Singapore. Stage buses by Causeway Link, Singapore-Johore Express and SBS Transit terminates at this terminal from various places in Singapore, mainly Kranji MRT station and Queen Street bus and taxi hub near Bugis. Tickets are purchased directly from the bus with most accepts debit and credit cards. Cross-border platforms are located separately from express buses.

Taxi hub for cross-border taxis is also available here, with their main service is to Queen Street hub in Singapore with a fixed fare. Fares can be paid when alighting the taxi.

Express buses to Hat Yai, Thailand is available from the terminal, although the ticketing and departure process is similar to other intercity buses.

== See also ==
- List of bus routes in Johor Bahru
- Transport in Malaysia
