= Malaysia Federal Route 93 =

Road in Malaysia

Federal Route 93
- Jalan Sungai Sayong
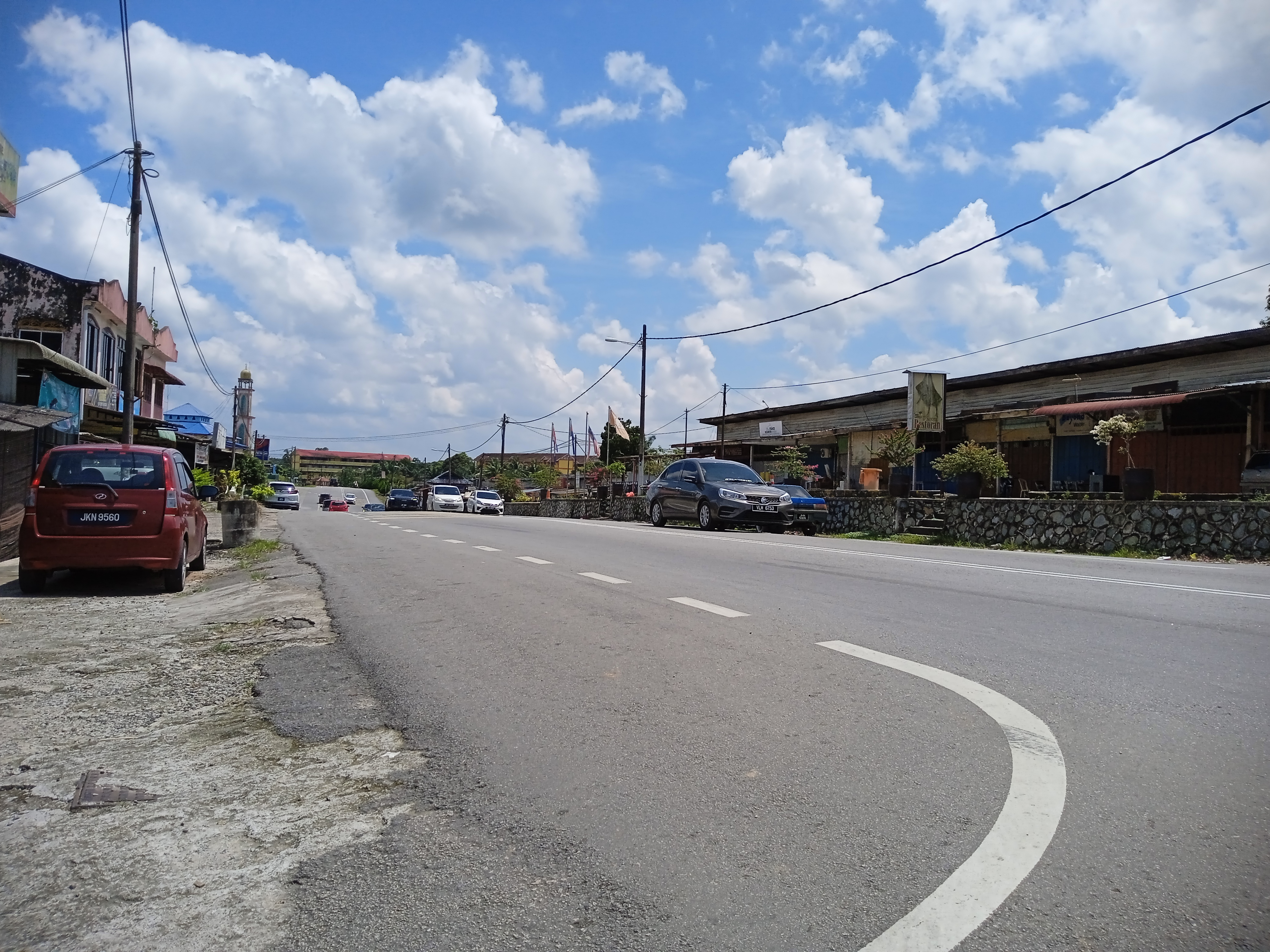

Route information
- Maintained by Malaysian Public Works Department
- Length: 14.32 km (8.90 mi)

Major junctions
- North end: Bandar Tenggara
- FT 91 Federal Route 91; FT 94 Federal Route 94
- South end: Jalan Kulai–Kota Tinggi

Location
- Country: Malaysia
- Primary destinations: Kluang, Kulai, Ulu Tiram

Highway system
- Highways in Malaysia; Expressways; Federal; State

Federal Route 93, or Jalan Sungai Sayong, is the main federal road in Johor, Malaysia.

== Features ==
At most sections, the Federal Route 93 was built under the JKR R5 road standard, allowing with a limit of 90 km/h.

== Junction and town lists ==
The entire route is located in Kota Tinggi District, Johor.

Legend:

- I/C - Interchange, I/S - Intersection, RSA - Rest and service area, OBR - Overhead bridge restaurant, R/R - Restaurant and rest plaza, L/B - Layby, V/P - Vista point, TN - tunnel, T/P - Toll plaza, BR - Bridge
- C - Cloverleaf, S - Stack, T-A - Trumpet-A, T-B - Trumpet-B, DT - Directional-T/Y, SDT - Semi-Directional-T/Y, P-Y - Partial-Y, D - Diamond, P-C - Partial cloverleaf, D-D - Diverging diamond, D-R - Direct ramp

Location	km	mi	Name	Destinations	Notes
Bandar Tenggara			Bandar Tenggara	FT 91 Malaysia Federal Route 91 – Bandar Tenggara, Mengkibol, Kluang, Kota Tinggi, Kota Tinggi waterfalls	T-junctions
Bandar Tenggara			FELDA Inas Utara & Selatan	Jalan FELDA Inas – FELDA Inas Utara & Selatan, FELDA Taib Andak	T-junctions
Bandar Tenggara			Sungai Sayong bridge		
Bandar Tenggara			Sungai Sayong Estate		
Kota Tinggi			FELDA Sungai Sayong		
Kota Tinggi			FELDA Pasir Raja	Jalan FELDA Pasir Raja – FELDA Pasir Raja, FELDA Taib Andak	
Kota Tinggi			FELDA Bukit Besar		
Kota Tinggi			Bukit Besar Estate		
Kota Tinggi			Jalan Kulai–Kota Tinggi I/S	FT 94 Malaysia Federal Route 94 – Kulai, Senai, Johor Bahru, Ulu Tiram, Kota Tinggi, Mersing, Desaru Second Link Expressway / AH143 – Tuas (Singapore); North–South Expressway Southern Route / AH2 – Kuala Lumpur	T-junctions
1.000 mi = 1.609 km; 1.000 km = 0.621 mi
