= Malaysia Federal Route 91 =

Road in Malaysia

Federal Route 91
- Jalan Kluang–Kota Tinggi
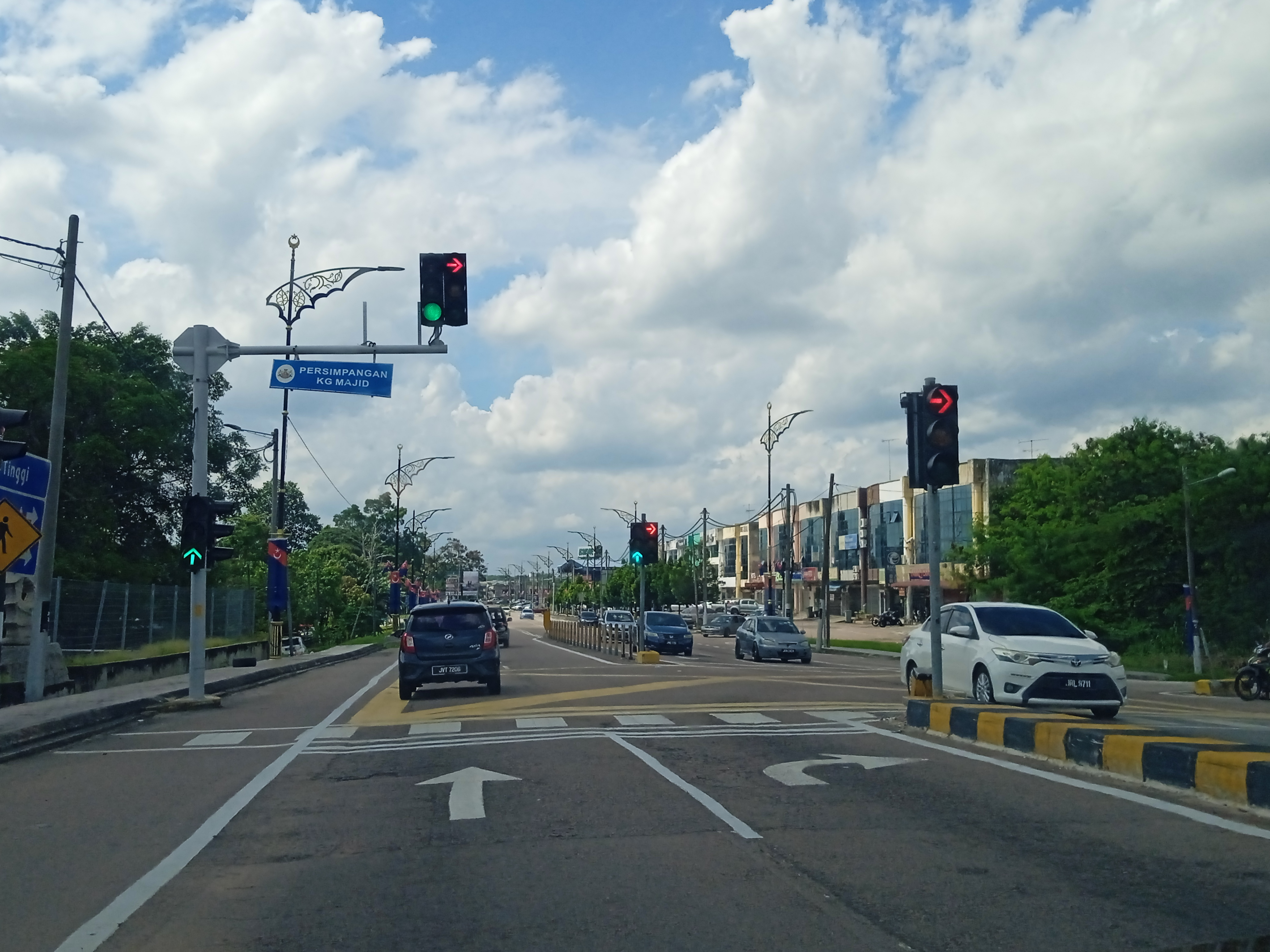

Route information
- Maintained by Malaysian Public Works Department
- Length: 81.6 km (50.7 mi)

Major junctions
- North end: Kluang
- FT 50 Federal Route 50; FT 173 Jalan Besar; FT 184 Jalan Padang Tembak; FT 93 Federal Route 93 FT 3 (Federal Route 3) / AH18
- South end: Kota Tinggi

Location
- Country: Malaysia
- Primary destinations: Mengkibol, Gunung Lambak, Taman Sri Lambak, Bandar Tenggara, Kota Tinggi Waterfalls

Highway system
- Highways in Malaysia; Expressways; Federal; State

Federal Route 91, or Jalan Kluang-Kota Tinggi, is the main federal road in Johor, Malaysia. It connects Kluang to Kota Tinggi.

== Route background ==
The route starts at Kluang and ends at Kota Tinggi via Gunung Lambak and Bandar Tenggera.

== Features ==
At most sections, the Federal Route 91 was built under the JKR R5 road standard, allowing maximum speed limit of up to 90 km/h.

== Junction and town lists ==
The entire route is located in Johor.

Legend:

- I/C - Interchange, I/S - Intersection, RSA - Rest and service area, OBR - Overhead bridge restaurant, R/R - Restaurant and rest plaza, L/B - Layby, V/P - Vista point, TN - tunnel, T/P - Toll plaza, BR - Bridge
- C - Cloverleaf, S - Stack, T-A - Trumpet-A, T-B - Trumpet-B, DT - Directional-T/Y, SDT - Semi-Directional-T/Y, P-Y - Partial-Y, D - Diamond, P-C - Partial cloverleaf, D-D - Diverging diamond, D-R - Direct ramp

District	km	Exit	Name	Destinations	Notes
Kluang			Kluang (Jalan Mersing I/S)	FT 50 Jalan Mersing – Ayer Hitam, Batu Pahat, Kahang, Jemaluang, Mersing	
Kluang			Jalan Besar I/S	FT 173 Jalan Besar – Batu Pahat, Ayer Hitam	
Kluang			Gunung Lambak Recreational Forest I/S	Gunung Lambak Recreational Forest	
Kluang			Enche' Besar Hajjah Khalsom Hospital	Enche' Besar Hajjah Khalsom Hospital	
Kluang			Gunung Lambak I/S	FT 184 Jalan Padang Tembak – Paloh, Gunung Lambak, Mengkibol, Renggam, Layang-Layang	
Kluang			Taman Sri Lambak		
Kluang			Gunung Belumut Recreational Forest I/S	Gunung Belumut Recreational Forest	
Kluang			FELDA Hulu Belitung		
Kota Tinggi			Bandar Tenggara		
Kota Tinggi			Jalan Sungai Sayong I/S	FT 93 Jalan Sungai Sayong – Felda Sungai Sayong, Kulai, Ulu Tiram	
Kota Tinggi		BR	Sungai Johor bridge		
Kota Tinggi		BR	Sungai Tengkil bridge		
Kota Tinggi			Felda Linggiu		
Kota Tinggi			Kampung Sayang Pinang		
Kota Tinggi			Kampung Asam		
Kota Tinggi		BR	Sungai Lebak bridge		
Kota Tinggi		BR	Sungai Sisek bridge		
Kota Tinggi		BR	Sungai Pelepah bridge		
Kota Tinggi			Jalan Lombong I/S	J171 Jalan Lombong – Kota Tinggi waterfalls, Gunung Panti Recreational Forest	
Kota Tinggi		BR	Sungai Panti Kechil bridge		
Kota Tinggi			Jalan Lombong I/S	J175 Jalan Lukut – Kampung Lukut	
Kota Tinggi		BR	Sungai Panti Besar bridge		
Kota Tinggi			Kampung Batu Empat		
Kota Tinggi			Kampung Jawa		
Kota Tinggi			Masjid Jamek Kota Tinggi		
Kota Tinggi			Kota Tinggi (Jalan Mawai I/S)	FT 3 / AH18 Jalan Mawai – Kuantan, Mersing, Jemaluang, Johor Bahru, Ulu Tiram	
