= Johor State Route J175 =

Road in Malaysia

Johor Route 175
- Jalan Lukut/Jalan Kampung Makam

Major junctions
- Northwest end: Jalan Kluang–Kota Tinggi
- FT 91 Federal Route 91 FT 3 / AH18 Federal Route 3
- Southeast end: Kampung Makam

Location
- Country: Malaysia
- Primary destinations: Batu 45 Lintang, Kampung Lukut, Kampung Makam

Highway system
- Highways in Malaysia; Expressways; Federal; State

Johor State Route J175 (Jalan Lukut and Jalan Kampung Makam) is a major road in Johor, Malaysia.

== Junction lists ==
The entire route is located in Kota Tinggi District, Johor.

Legend:

- I/C - Interchange, I/S - Intersection, RSA - Rest and service area, OBR - Overhead bridge restaurant, R/R - Restaurant and rest plaza, L/B - Layby, V/P - Vista point, TN - tunnel, T/P - Toll plaza, BR - Bridge
- C - Cloverleaf, S - Stack, T-A - Trumpet-A, T-B - Trumpet-B, DT - Directional-T/Y, SDT - Semi-Directional-T/Y, P-Y - Partial-Y, D - Diamond, P-C - Partial cloverleaf, D-D - Diverging diamond, D-R - Direct ramp

Km	Exit	Name	Destinations	Notes
		Jalan Kluang-Kota Tinggi	FT 91 Malaysia Federal Route 91 – Bandar Tenggara, Kluang, Lombong, Kota Tinggi waterfalls, Kota Tinggi town centre, Mersing, Johor Bahru	T-junctions
		Kampung Sepak		
		Batu 45 Lintang		
		Kota Kechil		
		Jalan Kota Tinggi-Mersing	FT 3 / AH18 Malaysia Federal Route 3 – Kota Tinggi town centre, Johor Bahru, Kuantan, Mersing, Jemaluang, Bandar Penawar, Pengerang, Desaru	Junctions
		Kota Makam Tauhid	Jalan Bendahara – Kota Makam Tauhid	T-junctions; Historical site
		Kampung Makam; Makam Tun Habab/Habib Abdul Majid	Makam Tun Habab/Habib Abdul Majid	Historical site
		Taman Indah, Kampung Makam	Jalan Indah – Taman Indah, Kampung Makam	T-junctions
		Kampung Makam; Site of Sultan Mahmud's Old Mosque; Sultan Mahmud's murder site	Site of Sultan Mahmud's Old Mosque; Sultan Mahmud's murder site	Historical site
		Kampung Makam; Sultan Mahmud Mangkat Di Julang Mausoleum Complex	Sultan Mahmud Mangkat Di Julang Mausoleum – Sultan Mahmud Mangkat Di Julang Mausoleum, Kucing Bertanduk Mausoleum, Masjid Al-Hidayah, Kampung Makam (formerly Masjid Sultanah Rogaiyah)	T-junctions; Historical site
		Kampung Makam; Pengkalan Kota Jetty	Pengkalan Kota Jetty	
