= Johor State Route J171 =

Road in Malaysia

Johor Route 171
- Jalan Lombong

Major junctions
- North end: Kota Tinggi Waterfalls
- FT 91 Federal Route 91
- South end: Jalan Kluang-Kota Tinggi

Location
- Country: Malaysia
- Primary destinations: Lombong

Highway system
- Highways in Malaysia; Expressways; Federal; State

Jalan Lombong, Johor State Route J171 is a major road in Johor, Malaysia. It is also a main route to Kota Tinggi Waterfalls.

== Junction lists ==
The entire route is located in Kota Tinggi District, Johor.

Legend:

- I/C - Interchange, I/S - Intersection, RSA - Rest and service area, OBR - Overhead bridge restaurant, R/R - Restaurant and rest plaza, L/B - Layby, V/P - Vista point, TN - tunnel, T/P - Toll plaza, BR - Bridge
- C - Cloverleaf, S - Stack, T-A - Trumpet-A, T-B - Trumpet-B, DT - Directional-T/Y, SDT - Semi-Directional-T/Y, P-Y - Partial-Y, D - Diamond, P-C - Partial cloverleaf, D-D - Diverging diamond, D-R - Direct ramp

Location	km	Name	Destinations	Notes
Lombong		Jalan Kluang-Kota Tinggi	FT 91 Malaysia Federal Route 91 – Kluang, Bandar Tenggara, Kota Tinggi, Mersing, Johor Bahru	T-junctions
Lombong		Lombong		
Lombong		Kota Tinggi Waterfalls	Kota Tinggi Waterfalls – Gunung Panti Recreational Forest, Stalls and shops V	
1.000 mi = 1.609 km; 1.000 km = 0.621 mi
