= Jalan FELDA Taib Andak =

Road in Malaysia

Federal Route 1388
- Jalan FELDA Taib Andak

Major junctions
- North end: FT 94 Jalan Kulai-Kota Tinggi
- FT 94 Federal Route 94
- South end: FELDA Taib Andak

Location
- Country: Malaysia

Highway system
- Highways in Malaysia; Expressways; Federal; State

Jalan FELDA Taib Andak, Federal Route 1388, is a federal road in Johor, Malaysia.

At most sections, the Federal Route 1388 was built under the JKR R5 road standard, allowing a maximum speed limit of up to 90 km/h.

== List of junctions and towns ==
Km	Exit	Junctions	To	Remarks
		Jalan Kulai-Kota Tinggi	West; J8 Ulu Tiram; FT 94 Kulai; FT 1 Johor Bahru; Second Link Expressway Singapore; North–South Expressway Southern Route AH2 Kuala Lumpur East; FT 94 Kota Tinggi; FT 3 AH18 Mersing; FT 92 Desaru	T-junctions
		FELDA Taib Andak; Welcome arch		
		FELDA Taib Andak	Masjid FELDA Taib Andak; Sekolah Kebangsaan Sinar Bahagia	
