= Malaysia Federal Route 94 =

Road in Malaysia

Federal Route 94
- Jalan Kulai–Kota Tinggi

Route information
- Length: 36.01 km (22.38 mi)

Major junctions
- West end: Kulai
- FT 1 Federal Route 1 FT 1388 Jalan FELDA Taib Andak; FT 93 Jalan Sungai Sayong FT 3 / AH18 Federal Route 3
- East end: Kota Tinggi

Location
- Country: Malaysia
- Primary destinations: Senai, Bandar Tenggara, Kluang, Ulu Tiram, Desaru, Mersing

Highway system
- Highways in Malaysia; Expressways; Federal; State

Federal Route 94, or Jalan Kulai–Kota Tinggi, is the main federal road in Johor, Malaysia. It connects Kulai to Kota Tinggi.

== Route background ==
The Kilometre Zero of the Federal Route 94 is located at Kulai, at its interchange with the Federal Route 1, the main trunk road of the central of Peninsular Malaysia.

== Features ==
At most sections, the Federal Route 94 was built under the JKR R5 road standard, allowing maximum speed limit of up to 90 km/h.

== Junction and town lists ==
The entire route is located in Johor.

Legend:

- I/C - Interchange, I/S - Intersection, RSA - Rest and service area, OBR - Overhead bridge restaurant, R/R - Restaurant and rest plaza, L/B - Layby, V/P - Vista point, TN - tunnel, T/P - Toll plaza, BR - Bridge

District	km	Exit	Name	Destinations	Notes
Kulai	0.0		Kulai	FT 1 Malaysia Federal Route 1 – Segamat, Labis, Yong Peng, Ayer Hitam, Simpang Renggam, Senai, Senai International Airport, Skudai, Johor Bahru, Pontian; North–South Expressway Southern Route / AH2 – Kuala Lumpur, Johor Bahru, Woodlands (Singapore) Second Link Expressway / AH143 – Gelang Patah, Tuas (Singapore)	T-junctions
Kulai		BR	Railway crossing bridge		
Kulai		BR	Skudai River bridge		
Kulai			Kulai Cemetery	Kulai Chinese Cemetery, Kulai Muslim Cemetery, Kulai Christian Cemetery	
Kulai			Taman Mewah		
Kulai			Taman Mas		
Kulai			Taman Jaya		
Kulai			Taman Semenanjung		
Kulai			Taman Chantik		
Kulai			Perpetual Memorial Park		
Kulai			Jalan FELDA Taib Andak	FT 1388 Jalan FELDA Taib Andak – FELDA Taib Andak	T-junctions
Kulai			Taib Andak Estate		
Kulai			Jalan Ulu Tiram	FT 1375 Malaysia Federal Route 1375 – Ulu Tiram	T-junctions
Kota Tinggi			Jalan Sungai Sayong	FT 93 Jalan Sungai Sayong – Sungai Sayong, Bandar Tenggara, Mengkibol, Kluang	T-junctions
Kota Tinggi			Semangar Estate		
Kota Tinggi			Kampung Semangar Luar		
Kota Tinggi			Semangar Estate		
Kota Tinggi			Jalan Semangar	J224 Jalan Semangar	T-junctions
Kota Tinggi			Kampung Sungai Telor	Kampung Sungai Telor – SAJ Quarters	T-junctions
Kota Tinggi		BR	Sungai Telor bridge		
Kota Tinggi			Semangar Estate		
Kota Tinggi			Jalan Semangar	J224 Jalan Semangar – Semangar Dam, Semangar Water Plant, Tai Hong	T-junctions
Kota Tinggi			Semangar Dam	Semangar Dam – Semangar Water Plant	T-junctions
Kota Tinggi			Semangar Estate		
Kota Tinggi			Kota Tinggi palm oil processing plant		
Kota Tinggi	36.0		Kota Tinggi	FT 3 / AH18 Johor Bahru–Kota Tinggi Highway – Kuantan, Mersing, Kota Tinggi, Kota Tinggi waterfall, Pengerang, Desaru, Ulu Tiram, Pasir Gudang, Johor Bahru	T-junctions
