= Tenggara =

Tenggara means southeast in Malay languages (Indonesian and Malaysian). The term can be frequently found in topography (e.g., Southeast Asia: Asia Tenggara).

Indonesia

- Nusa Tenggara, Southeast Islands or Lesser Sunda Islands
  - East Nusa Tenggara
  - West Nusa Tenggara
- Sulawesi Tenggara

Malaysia

- Bandar Tenggara
