= Malaysia Federal Route 1375 =

Road in Malaysia

Federal Route 1375
- Jalan Ulu Tiram

Route information
- Maintained by Malaysian Public Works Department

Major junctions
- West end: FT 94 Jalan Kulai–Kota Tinggi
- FT 94 Federal Route 94 FT 3 (Johor Bahru–Kota Tinggi Highway) / AH18
- East end: Kampung Kangkar Sungai Tiram

Location
- Country: Malaysia
- Primary destinations: FELDA Ulu Tebrau, Ulu Tiram, Kampung Sungai Tiram

Highway system
- Highways in Malaysia; Expressways; Federal; State

Jalan Ulu Tiram or Jalan Sungai Tiram, Federal Route 1375 (formerly Johor State Route J8) is a major road in Johor, Malaysia.

== Junction lists ==
The entire route is located in Johor.

Legend:

- I/C - Interchange, I/S - Intersection, RSA - Rest and service area, OBR - Overhead bridge restaurant, R/R - Restaurant and rest plaza, L/B - Layby, V/P - Vista point, TN - tunnel, T/P - Toll plaza, BR - Bridge
- C - Cloverleaf, S - Stack, T-A - Trumpet-A, T-B - Trumpet-B, DT - Directional-T/Y, SDT - Semi-Directional-T/Y, P-Y - Partial-Y, D - Diamond, P-C - Partial cloverleaf, D-D - Diverging diamond, D-R - Direct ramp

District	Location	km	mi	Name	Destinations	Notes
Kulai	Kulai			Jalan Kulai–Kota Tinggi	FT 94 Malaysia Federal Route 94 – Kulai, Johor Bahru, Kota Tinggi, Mersing, Bandar Tenggara, Kluang, Kota Tinggi waterfall, Desaru	T-junctions
Kulai	Kulai			Roscote Estate		
Kulai	Kulai			Kampung Roscote		
Johor Bahru	Ulu Tebrau			Jalan Ulu Tiram–Seelong	J8 Johor State Route J8 – Seelong, Senai, Senai International Airport	T-junctions
Johor Bahru	Ulu Tebrau			FELDA Ulu Tebrau	FELDA Ulu Tebrau	T-junctions
Johor Bahru	Ulu Tebrau			Ulu Tebrau Estate		
Johor Bahru	Ulu Tebrau			Kampung Kiambang		
Johor Bahru	Ulu Tiram			Taman Bukit Jaya		
Johor Bahru	Ulu Tiram			Taman Tiram Jaya		
Johor Bahru	Ulu Tiram			Taman Bukit Tiram		
Johor Bahru	Ulu Tiram			Ulu Tiram	FT 3 (Johor Bahru–Kota Tinggi Highway) / AH18 – Kota Tinggi, Mersing, Kota Tinggi waterfall, Desaru, Pasir Gudang, Johor Bahru, Singapore	Diamond interchange
Johor Bahru	Ulu Tiram			Taman Tiram Baru		
Johor Bahru	Ulu Tiram			Taman Seri Jaya		
Johor Bahru	Ulu Tiram			Kampung Ulu Plentong		
Johor Bahru	Ulu Tiram			Kampung Tenang		
Johor Bahru	Sungai Tiram			Sungai Tiram bridge		
Johor Bahru	Sungai Tiram			Kampung Oren		
Johor Bahru	Sungai Tiram			Kampung Sungai Tiram		
Johor Bahru	Sungai Tiram			Kampung Kangkar Sungai Tiram		
1.000 mi = 1.609 km; 1.000 km = 0.621 mi
