= Mahmud Shah II of Johor =

Sultan of Johor, Pahang and Lingga

Paduka Sri Sultan Mahmud Shah II ibni al-Marhum Sultan Ibrahim Shah (1675 or 1680 – 1699) was the Sultan of Johor, Pahang and Lingga (1685 – 3 September 1699). As he was young upon assuming the throne, regents oversaw the affairs of state in Johor until the death of the Bendahara, one of the two regents, in 1697. Upon assuming duties as sultan, Mahmud Shah II undermined Johor's stability due to his erratic behavior. As a result, he was murdered by members of his advisory council in 1699. His death led to a period of upheaval and chaos in the southern Strait of Malacca, as successors fought for control of the state.

== Life ==
Mahmud Shah II's year of birth is uncertain. Many sources report that he was born in 1675, while other state that his birth more likely was closer to 1680. Much of this is obscured due to the circumstances of his rule and death. Mahmud Shah II became sultan in 1685, following the death of his father Ibrahim Shah, who had overseen an expansion of territorial control and economic prosperity until Johor encompassed much of the southern reaches of the Strait of Malacca and the Malay Peninsula as well as eastern Sumatra. As Mahmud Shah II was a young child at the time, the state operated under the joint regency of his mother and the Bendahara Paduka Raja until the latter's death on 27 July 1697. Mahmud Shah II then took on all official duties as sultan.

The reign of Sultan Mahmud Shah II was disastrous. He was erratic and – according to contemporary European trade company sources as well as local texts – exhibited a "cruel nature" leading the state to be described as "ungovernable." Much of this was exhibited in sadistic behavior. Local texts contain references to the Sultan being violent towards women, even ordering their execution for minor offences. The Scottish country trader Alexander Hamilton vividly recorded several incidents, including the discharge of a firearm into a "poor fellow" on the street to test its efficacy. This behavior threatened the well-being of the state, as traders and merchants began avoiding the main port. The economic turmoil that ensued, combined with violence directed towards women related to the Orang kaya (Malay nobility), led high officials of the state to decide to act against the Sultan.

== Death ==
By August 1699 the Orang kaya enacted a plan to eliminate Sultan Mahmud Shah II. According to both European and local texts, the various officials of state descended upon the young sultan and stabbed him to death. Many later accounts claim this occurred when Mahmud Shah II was making his way to the royal mosque, while others described it as occurring in the market. According to Dutch East India Company reports, his naked corpse was dragged to the Bendahara's residence, where it lay exposed until late afternoon. Later that night the body was wrapped in cloth, taken away and buried with little ceremony. His grave still exists in a village near Kota Tinggi in Johor, which is still known today as Kampung Makam (Village of the Tomb).

== Aftermath of his murder ==
The killing of Sultan Mahmud Shah II created a crisis in the Johor state as he was considered to be the last in line of the dynasty descended from the rulers of Johor and therefore Malacca and consequently Srivijaya. After the murder, the Bendahara Abdul Jalil declared himself the next Sultan of Johor. Over the next two decades, the Bendahara dynasty had difficulty gaining support, leading to attempts from communities living in the peripheral areas of Johor to exert their own sovereignty. One major example of this, by 1718, a usurper from eastern Sumatra known as Raja Kecil, and claiming to be the son of Sultan Mahmud Shah II, attacked Johor with the support of Orang Laut and a variety of diverse ethnic groups. Following four years of chaotic rule, Raja Kecil retreated to eastern Sumatra, where he founded the Siak Sultanate in 1722, and descendants of the Bendahara sultan returned to power under a new arrangement with Bugis mercenaries, thus laying the foundation for the Johor-Riau-Lingga sultanate.

== Legend and historiography ==
As he was the last ruler of dynasty descended from the Sultans of Malacca, and regicide was an unimaginable act in Malay culture, the murder of Sultan Mahmud Shah II created numerous difficulties for society at the time. Legends, tales, and alternative accounts quickly sprang up, mainly to reduce the complicity of the ruling elite in his death. Among the most popularly accepted retellings of these events placed blame for the regicide on one official, Laksamana Megat Sri Rama (hailing from Bintan), who was supposedly motivated by the disembowelment of his own pregnant wife under the orders of Mahmud Shah II. Enraged by this injustice, Megat Sri Rama attacked the Sultan while he was being carried to Friday prayers, resulting in the common appellation "Sultan Mahmud Mangkat Dijulang," in remembrance of the way he was killed (mangkat being the Malay word referring specifically to a royal death) while being carried (dijulang) in a royal litter or dais. This tale was recreated in court texts for the next two centuries, particularly in the Tuhfat al-Nafis and the Hikayat Siak.

As Sultan Mahmud Shah II was childless at the time of his death, other legends arose related to Raja Kecil, who claimed that he was conceived in a supernatural manner on the eve of the murder. Although Raja Kecil already had adult children at the time of his attack on the Johor state in 1718, his use of this legend in eastern Sumatra enabled him to attract followers hoping to continue the legacy of traditional Johor rulers and avenge the murder of a spiritually powerful ruler. The supposed connection between Raja Kecil and Sultan Mahmud Shah II was subsequently used to legitimatize the Siak Sultanate, which Raja Kecil founded in 1722, as a Malay state.

The legend of Sultan Mahmud Shah II become the subject matter for popular culture texts in the 1950s and 1960s, including the 1961 film Sultan Mahmud Mangkat Dijulang directed by K.M. Basker starring M. Amin as the Sultan.

== Sexuality ==
Sultan Mahmud Shah II was described in contemporary European accounts as having a preference for male sexual partners. Scottish sea captain and trader Alexander Hamilton, who visited Johor in 1695, reported in his travelogue A New Account of the East Indies (1727) that the Sultan was attracted to men and had allegedly taken the sons of Johor nobles into his palace. Hamilton also recounted an incident involving a merchant whose son had attracted the Sultan's attention, prompting Hamilton to intervene to protect the boy.

Hamilton further claimed that the Sultan's mother attempted to encourage his interest in women by arranging for a young woman to visit him, but that the encounter ended violently. These allegations were discussed by Simon Obendorf in his 2006 doctoral thesis, Sexing up the International, which examined European colonial narratives of sexuality and their representation of Malay society.

The Malay chronicle Tuhfat al-Nafis, written by Raja Ali Haji in the nineteenth century, offers a different account. According to Obendorf's analysis, the chronicle indirectly refers to the Sultan's preference for men through a narrative that he had taken a peri (fairy or supernatural being) as his wife and consequently had no desire to marry a human woman. The chronicle also provides an extraordinary account of how one of his concubines conceived a child after his death, thereby explaining the continuation of the royal lineage.

Obendorf notes that the Malay chronicle's treatment of the sultan's same-sex preferences differs from Hamilton's account, particularly in its emphasis on the continuation of the royal lineage rather than on his sexual conduct. The historical accounts therefore provide evidence of reported same-sex preferences, although they do not establish how the Sultan himself understood his sexuality in modern terms.

Mahmud Shah II of Johor Malacca-Johor dynasty Born: 1675 Died: 1699
Regnal titles
Preceded by Ibrahim Shah	Sultan of Johor; 1685–1699	Succeeded by Abdul Jalil Shah IV
