= Taman Sri Lambak =

Sri Lambak
- Township
- Taman Sri Lambak
- Location within Johor Location within Peninsular Malaysia Location within Malaysia
- Coordinates: 1°57′25″N 103°23′12″E
- Country: Malaysia
- State: Johor
- District: Kluang
- Time zone: UTC+8 (MYT)
- Postal code: 86000

Taman Sri Lambak or Bandar Taman Sri Lambak (Bandar T6) is a township in Kluang District, Johor, Malaysia. Established under the KEJORA (Lembaga Kemajuan Johor Tenggara) program, it is the third largest new town in the KEJORA zone after Bandar Tenggara and Bandar Penawar. Located just beside the Federal Route 91, motorists from Kluang can enjoy the scenery of Gunung Lambak on the way to the township.
