= Sultan Mahmud Mangkat Di Julang Mausoleum =

Mausoleum in Kota Tinggi, Johor, Malaysia

Coordinates: 1°43′45.2″N 103°54′29.5″E

- Makam Sultan Mahmud Mangkat Di Julang
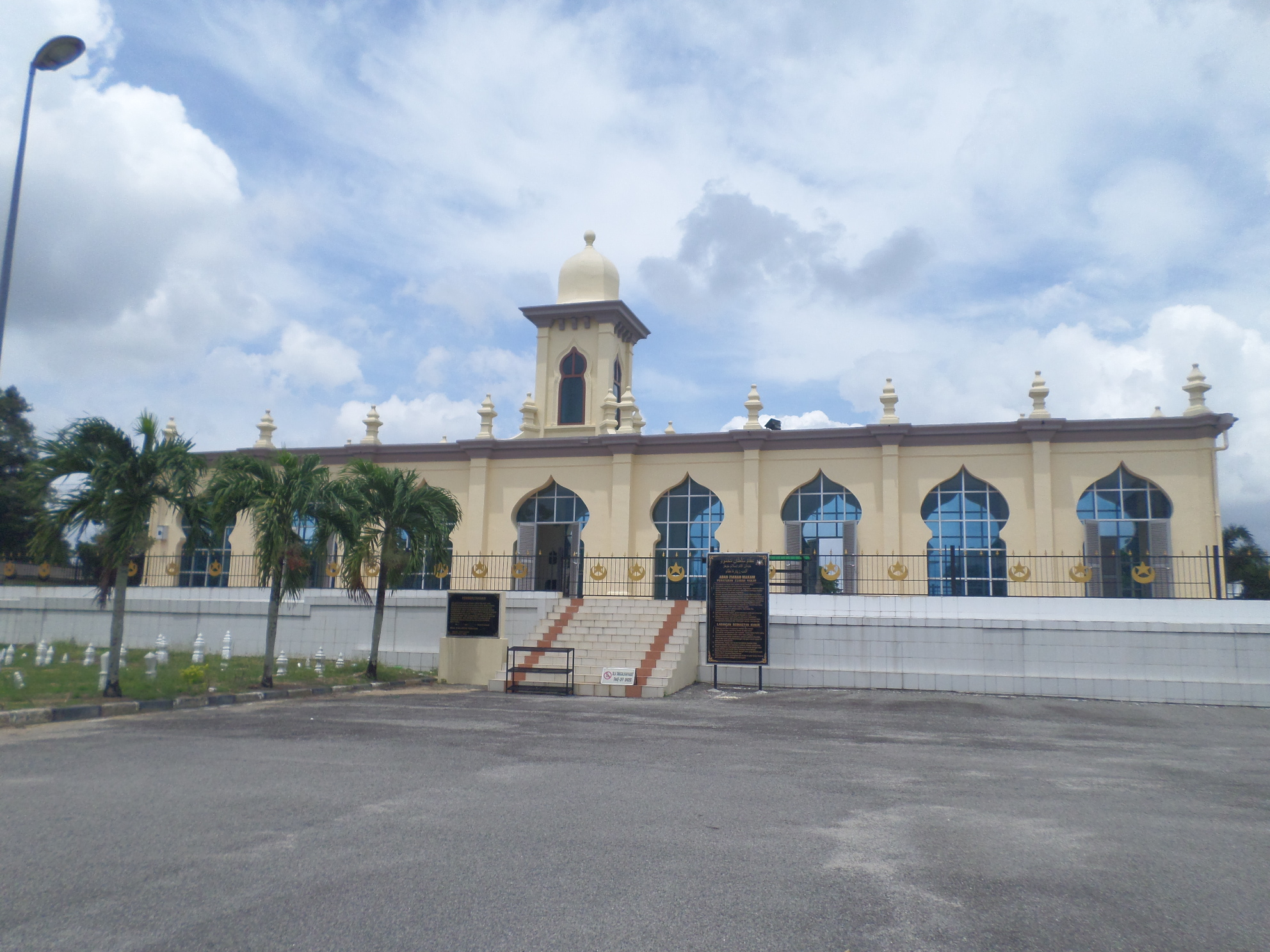
- Interactive map of Sultan Mahmud Mangkat Di Julang Mausoleum

Details
- Location: Kampung Makam, Kota Tinggi, Johor, Malaysia
- Type: Royal mausoleum
- Style: Moorish, Malay

Sultan Mahmud Mangkat Di Julang Mausoleum (Malay: Makam Sultan Mahmud Mangkat Di Julang) is a historical tomb in Kota Tinggi District, Johor in Malaysia. It is situated in a village of Kampung Makam near Kota Tinggi town. Its main feature is the Tomb of Sultan Mahmud Shah II, who was the last ruler of Johor descended from the Sultans of Malacca.

== History ==
The tomb's legend is found in the book Tuhfat al-Nafis. In 1699, during the reign of Mahmud Shah II, pirates were storming the shores of southern Johor, from Mersing to Pulau Penyengat and Riau. Laksamana (Admiral) Megat Seri Rama, known as Laksamana Bentan, — named after his island of origin Bintan — was ordered to stop the pirates. He left behind his wife, Dang Anum, who was pregnant, while he went to stop the pirate attacks.

His absence presented an opportunity to a former palace officer, who was jealous of Megat Seri Rama, to plot against him. Dang Anum craved a piece of jackfruit, taken from the palace orchard, that was on its way to be presented to the Sultan. The penghulu or the head of a sub-district, who was sending the fruit to the palace sympathised with Dang Anum. He stole a piece of jackfruit and gave it to Dang Anum. The Sultan, who noticed that the fruit had been cut, before he tasted the fruit, was angered with the penghulu's action. His thoughts were also influenced by the palace officer who said that Dang Anum's action had obviously brought shame to the Sultan, leaving the Sultan to eat the rest of the fruit after her. The sultan ordered the women to the palace for punishment. Desperate for her life and her unborn child, Dang Anum told the sultan that the fruit that she ate was for her child. The Sultan asked for proof and the woman's belly was cut, and the child was seen with the piece of the jackfruit.

The murder was kept secret to all the palace inhabitants. As Megat Seri Rama discovered the murder of his wife and unborn child after returning from the war, he decided to seek revenge. On one Friday afternoon, during the Friday prayers, while the Sultan was being carried up (dijulang) by his men, he was ambushed and stabbed to death by Rama. As the sultan heaved his last breath, he cast a curse which forbade all sons of Bintan to touch the grounds of Kota Tinggi for eternity or they shall vomit blood to death. Rama died as well as the sultan. The sultan, known later as the "one died in his palanquin" (Sultan Mahmud Mangkat Dijulang) was buried in Kampung Makam, Kota Tinggi, while Laksamana Megat Seri Rama at Kampung Kelantan, also in Kota Tinggi. To this day, there are people who still believe that the curse exists and most Bintanese feared to come to Kota Tinggi. Other versions of this story state that the curse lasts seven generations.

== Notable features ==
- Makam Sultan Mahmud Shah. It is a long mausoleum with a minaret, containing royal graves.
- Makam Kucing Bertanduk ("The Horned Cat Mausoleum") A single grave located right next to the mausoleum.
- Masjid Sultanah Rogaiyah. The mosque at the tomb.
- The supposedly murder site of Sultan Mahmud

== See also ==
- Kota Tinggi
