= Tuhfat al-Nafis =

19th-century Malay literature

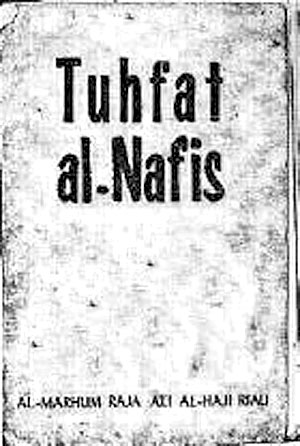
Out of print cover of Tuhfat al-Nafis.

Tuhfat al-Nafis (Arabic: تحفة النفيس; English: The Precious Gift) is a work of Malay literature written by the Bugis historian Raja Ali Haji in Jawi in around 1866–1870. It records and chronicles events, especially those of the 19th century, that occurred in several Malay states. Some of the events recorded in the work include the founding of the state of Terengganu, the murder of Sultan Mahmud Shah II of Johor and of explaining the relationships between the Bugis and the kings of Johor and Sumatra. Tuhfat al-Nafis means "the precious gift" in the Arabic language.

There are four manuscripts of Tuhfat al-Nafis. A manuscript copied in 1890 and published in 1923 is in the Journal of the Malayan Branch of the Royal Asiatic Society, London.

Tuhfat al-Nafis begins with a summary taken from the Sulalatus Salatin (Malay Annals), and then tells a more detailed history of the Johor-Riau Sultanate. Tuhfat was a dynamic figure in the Bugis principality, who with military and diplomatic dexterity managed to gain an important position in the Riau states, Selangor, Sambas and Matan-Sukadana.

Some information, though not in strong detail, is discussed on the organization of the 1718 Minangkabau invasion of Johor, the true identity of Raja Kechil, as well as the war between the Bugis and the Minangkabau in Kedah between 1723 and 1725. Historians agree there is a pro-Bugis slant in his work, and while a lot of the events he covers are also covered in the pro-Siak Siak Chronicles, the Tuhfat al-Nahfis provides a good counterbalance to this other source that deals with the same topics.

A recurrent theme in the first half of Tuhfat al-Nafis is conflict between the Minangkabau people of Riau as well as Bugis and Malay alliance forces. The conflict occurred both in the provinces of Riau and in Kedah, Selangor, Siak and Kalimantan. The second half covers the middle of the 18th century until 1864, showing the growing hostility between the Bugis and Malays in Riau, and two raids led by the Bugis people of Malacca to the Dutch in 1756 and 1784. The last attack ended when the Dutch signed a treaty with the Sultan of Riau who conceded his kingdom as a fief of the Dutch East India Company.

As court genealogist and historian, he compiled his sources from court notebooks, histories found in court archives and personal accounts of those with memories of a not-too-distant past; he also uses sources as varied as Karangan Engku Busu, Hikayat Negeri Johor, Siak Chronicles and the now lost Sejarah Pihak Terengganu.
