= Kota Tinggi Waterfalls =

Waterfall in Kota Tinggi, Johor, Malaysia

Coordinates: 1°49′50″N 103°49′56″E

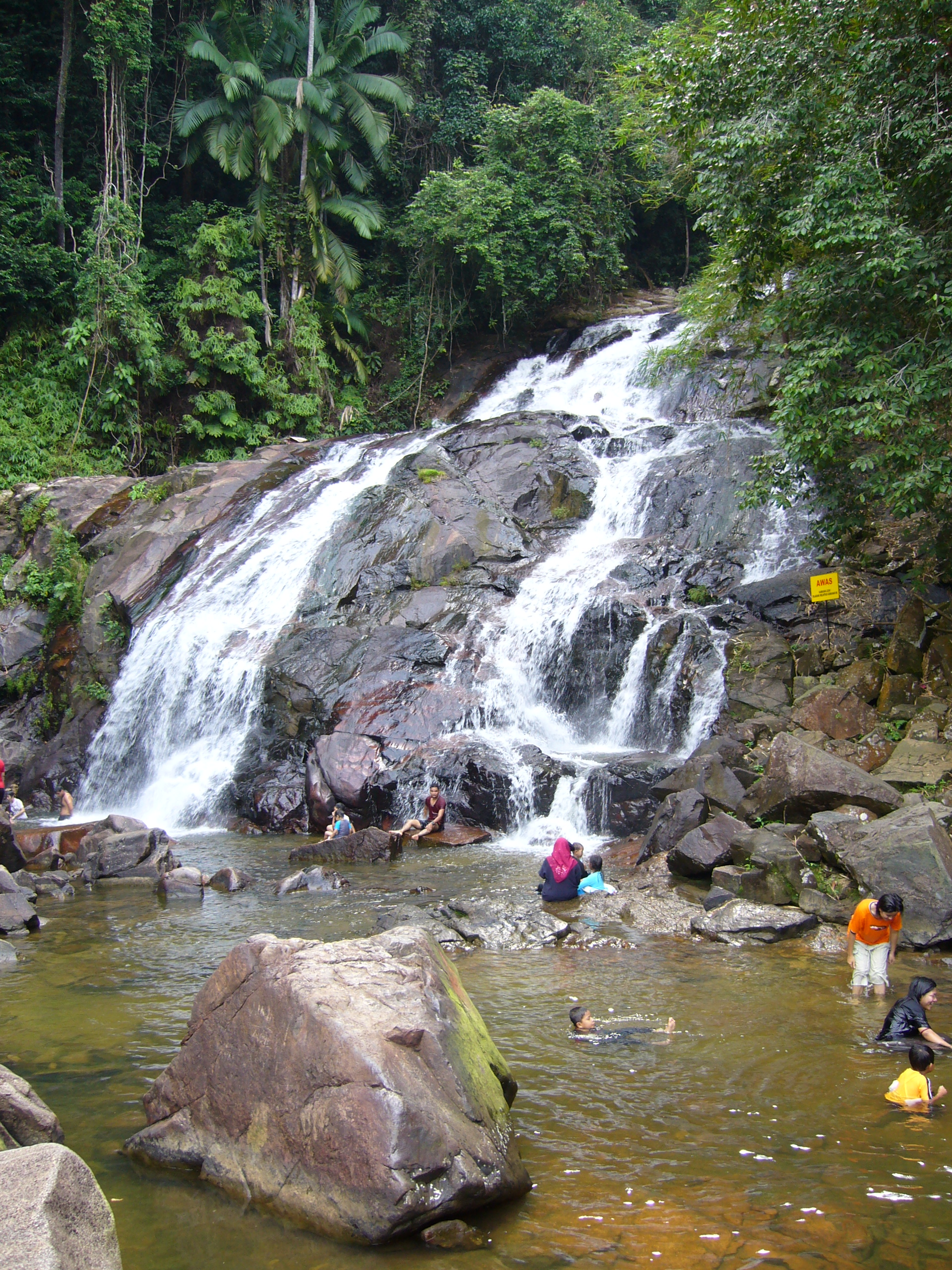
- Location: Kota Tinggi, Johor, Malaysia

Kota Tinggi Waterfalls is a waterfall in Kota Tinggi, Johor, Malaysia. The waterfalls are located in Lombong at the foot of Gunung (Mountain) Muntahak.

== See also ==
- Geography of Malaysia
- List of waterfalls
