= Raja Ali Haji =

Malay poet

Raja Ali Haji راج علي حاج
- Born: Raja Ali Haji bin Raja Haji Ahmad; 1808; Selangor Sultanate or Penyengat Island, Riau Islands, Johor Sultanate
- Died: 1873 (aged 64–65); Penyengat Island, Riau Islands, Riau-Lingga Sultanate
- Occupations: Poet, Historian
- Relatives: Raja Haji Fisabilillah (grandfather)
- Writing career
- Language: Malay

Raja Ali Haji bin Raja Haji Ahmad (1808–1873) was a 19th-century Bugis-Malay historian, poet and scholar who wrote Tuhfal al-Nafis. Haji has been described as one of the most important Malay writers of the 19th century.

== Early life ==
Raja Ali Haji was born in Selangor (although some sources stated that he was born in Penyengat) in 1808 or 1809, and was the son of Raja Ahmad, who was titled Engku Haji Tua after accomplishing the pilgrimage to Mecca. He was the grandson of Raja Haji Fisabilillah, the fourth Yang di-Pertuan Muda of Riau from 1777 to 1784. Fisabilillah was a scion of the royal house of Riau, who were descended from Bugis warriors who came to the region in the 18th century. His mother, Encik Hamidah binti Malik was a cousin of his father and also of Bugis descent. Raji Ali Haji soon relocated to Penyengat as an infant, where he grew up and received his education.

== Career ==
He went on pilgrimage to Mecca in 1828 when he was 19 years old. Haji undertook a diverse education and he eventually became renowned for his learning. He was 32, Haji became a joint regent who helped administer Lingga for the young Sultan Mahmud Muzaffar Shah of the Riau-Lingga Sultanate.

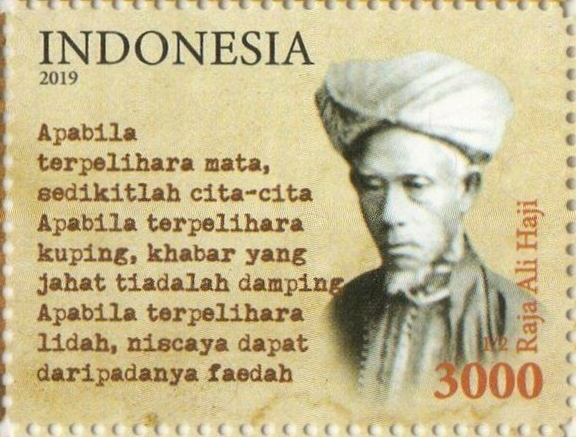
Raja Ali Haji on a 2019 stamp of Indonesia

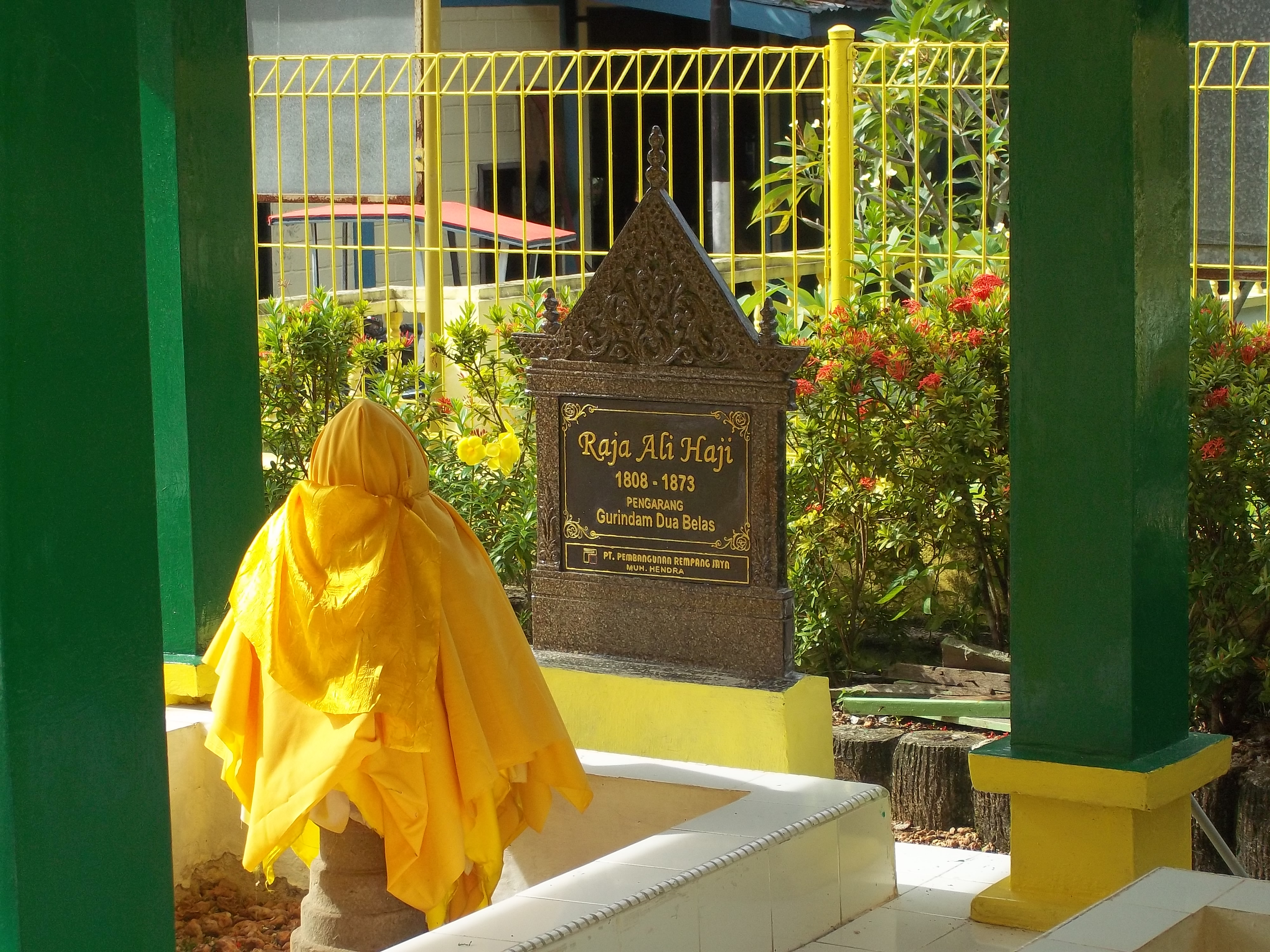
Raja Ali Haji's tomb on Penyengat Island.

== Death ==
Most sources stated that Raja Ali Haji died in 1872 at Penyengat Island in Riau, but the date of his death is debated as scattered evidences surfaced to oppose this claim. Among the best-known evidences was a letter written in 1872 when Raja Ali Haji wrote a letter to Herman Von De Wall, a Dutch cultural expert, who later died at Tanjung Pinang in 1873.

He was elevated to the status of National Hero of Indonesia in 2004.

== Ancestry ==
Ancestors of Raja Ali Haji

Upu Tenribong Daéng Rilaka
Daéng Chelak
Raja Ali Haji Fisabilillah
Tengku Mandak
Raja Ahmad (Raja Tua)
Raja Ali Haji
Panglima Perang Malik
Hamidah binti Panglima Perang Malik

== Notable works ==
=== Poems ===
- 1847: Syair Abdul Muluk (disputed)
- 1847: Gurindam Dua Belas

=== Books ===
- 1860s: Tuhfat al-Nafis (The Precious Gift)
- 1865: Silsilah Melayu dan Bugis

=== Other writings ===
- 1857: Bustan al-Kathibin
- 1850s: Kitab Pengetahuan Bahasa (uncompleted)
- 1857: Intizam Waza'if al-Malik
- 1857: Thamarat al-Mahammah
