= Johor State Route J8 =

Road in Johor, Malaysia

Johor Route 8
- Jalan Ulu Tiram–Seelong

Major junctions
- West end: Taman Bintang Utama, Senai
- FT 16 Senai Airport Highway; Persiaran SAC; Jalan Idaman; J105 State Route J105; FT 1375 Federal Route 1375
- East end: FELDA Ulum Tebrau

Location
- Country: Malaysia
- Primary destinations: Senai International Airport, Bukit Amber, Taman Desa Idaman, Taman Impian Emas, Seelong, Kempas

Highway system
- Highways in Malaysia; Expressways; Federal; State

Jalan Ulu Tiram–Seelong, Johor State Route J8/Johor State Route J2, previously gazetted as part of Johor State Route J192 (Senai–Seelong), is a major road in Johor, Malaysia.

== History ==
Since the high usage of heavier vehicles in J8 Jalan Seelong, the Senai Assemblyman Wong Bor Yang call out that the Malaysian Public Works Department (JKR) to upgrade the Jalan Seelong to four-lane dual carriageway.

== Junction lists ==
The entire route is located in Johor.

| District | Location | km | mi | Name | Destinations | Notes |
|---|---|---|---|---|---|---|
| Kulai | Senai | | | Senai; Taman Bintang Utama | Jalan Utama 1 – Taman Bintang Utama, Taman Seri Senai, Econsave Senai; FT 16 Senai Airport Highway – Senai, Kulai, Johor Bahru, Senai International Airport, Senai Industrial Area Phase 3 and 4 Second Link Expressway (Senai Link) – Kuala Lumpur, Tuas, Tanjung Pelepas, Iskandar Puteri | Junctions |
| Kulai | Senai | | | Taman Senai Baru | Jalan Murni – Murni Industrial Area, Taman Senai Baru (North), Taman Senai Indah; Jalan Padi Mahlinja 4 – Taman Senai Baru (South), Taman Mewah, Taman Sempena | Junctions |
| Kulai | Senai | | | Persiaran SAC | Persiaran SAC – Senai Airport City, Bukit Amber | T-junctions |
| Kulai | Senai | | | Taman Senai Jaya | | |
| Kulai | Senai | | | Jalan Idaman | Jalan Idaman – i Synergy, Malaysia Pepper Board | T-junctions |
| Kulai | Seelong | | | Jalan Kempas Lama | J105 Johor State Route J105 – Kempas, Bandar Dato' Onn, Johor Bahru | T-junctions |
| Kulai | Seelong | | | Persiaran Impian Jaya | Persiaran Impian Jaya – Taman Impian Jaya | T-junctions |
| Johor Bahru | Ulu Tebrau | | | Jalan Sungai Tiram | FT 1375 Malaysia Federal Route 1375 – Kulai, Kota Tinggi, FELDA Ulu Tebrau, Ulu Tiram | T-junctions |
1.000 mi = 1.609 km; 1.000 km = 0.621 mi
