= FELDA Taib Andak =

Settlement in Kulai District, Johor, Malaysia

Coordinates: 1°44′03.8″N 103°38′39.6″E

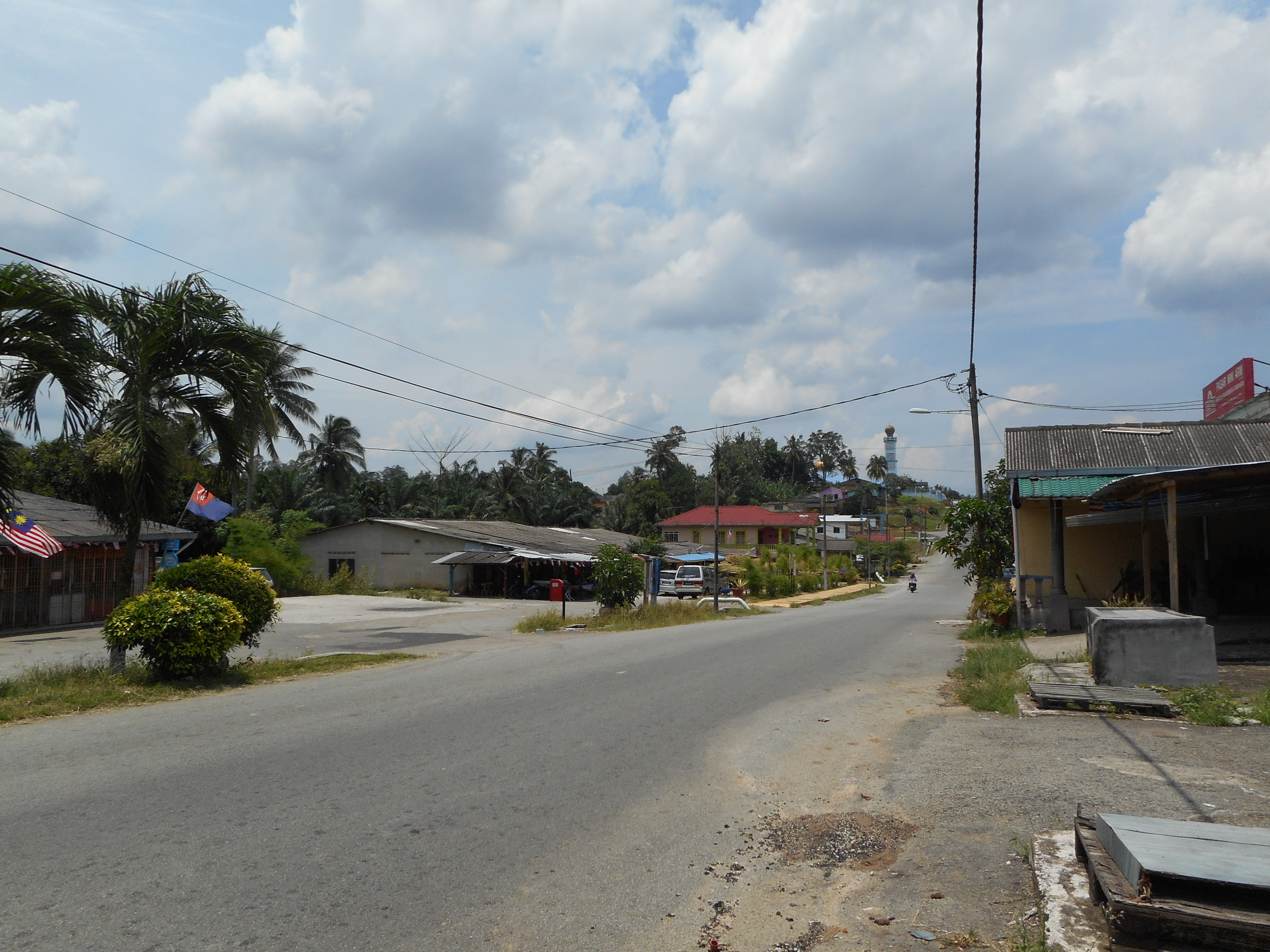
FELDA Taib Andak

FELDA Taib Andak or Kampung Taib Andak is a settlement in Kulai District, Johor, Malaysia. It is the earliest FELDA settlement in Johor, opened in 1960. This small town is located about 6 km from Kulai town. FELDA Taib Andak is easily accessible via Jalan Kulai-Kota Tinggi.

The FELDA settlement was named after the name of the second chairman of FELDA, Tan Sri Taib Andak.

The chief leader of this village is YBhg Tuan Haji Mohd Hanafiah bin Haji Hussain since 2001.

== Notable residents ==
- Que Haidar - Malaysian actor
- Mawi - Malaysian singer
