= Ulu Tiram =

Suburb in Johor Bahru

- Suburb of Johor Bahru
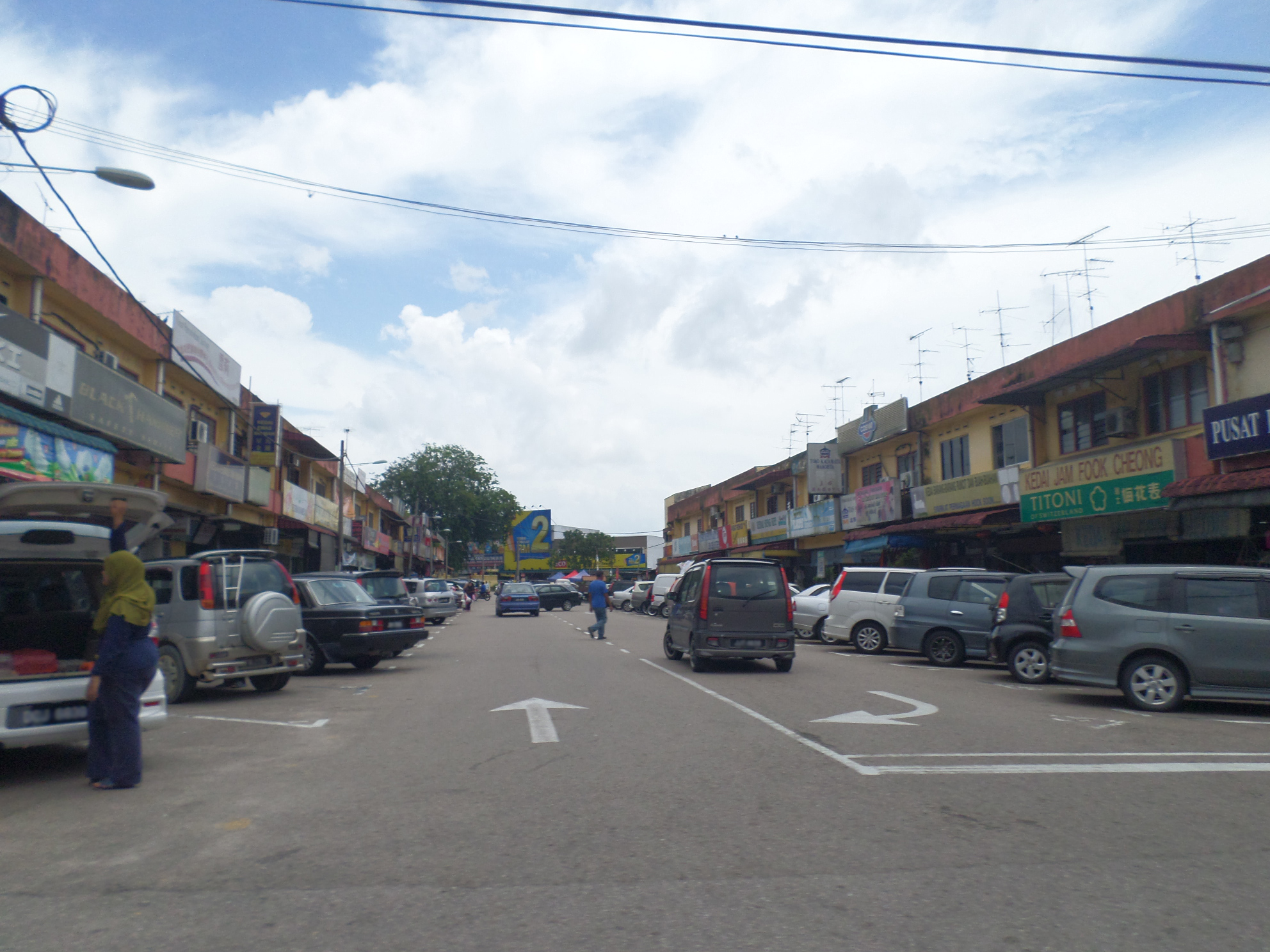
- Shophouses in Ulu Tiram

- Location within Iskandar Malaysia Location within Malaysia
- Coordinates: 1°36′00″N 103°49′13″E
- Country: Malaysia
- State: Johor
- District: Johor Bahru
- City: Johor Bahru

Area
  - Total: 239.2 km^{2} (92.4 sq mi)

Population (2015)
  - Total: 123,860
- Postcode: 81800

Ulu Tiram (Jawi: اولو تيرم; Chinese: 乌鲁地南; Tamil: உலு தீராம்) is a suburb in Johor Bahru, Johor, Malaysia. The town lies along the Tebrau Highway, a section of Malaysia Federal Route 3, a major trunk road on Peninsular Malaysia's east coast that connects Ulu Tiram with major towns and cities such as Mersing, Kuantan and Kota Bharu.

Ulu Tiram is located approximately 18 km north of Johor Bahru and 20 km south of Kota Tinggi. Ulu Tiram is accessible through the Tebrau Highway, Jalan Kota Tinggi trunk road, and the Senai–Desaru Expressway.

== History ==
Since the 1990s, the urban expansion of Johor Bahru has ended Ulu Tiram's relative isolation and it is now one of the fastest growing suburbs of the city as part of the Tebrau growth corridor. The town hosts a taxi depot which ferries people around Johor as well as to Johor Bahru. The taxi depot hosts a small shopping complex. The town is of little interest; markets and shophouses selling various provisions and accessories constitutes much of the town. The town also hosts a small housing and industrial estate.

== Residential Areas ==
- Bandar Tiram
- Felda Ulu Tebrau
- Kampung Sungai Tiram
- Kampung Tenang
- Taman Tiram Baru
- Taman Bukit Tiram
- Taman Intan
- Taman Sri Tiram
- Taman Ros
- Taman Mutiara
- Taman Nora
- Taman Maluri
- Taman Gunung Emas
- Taman Zamrud
- Taman Dato' Cheelam
- Taman Puteri Wangsa
- Taman Desa Cemerlang
- Taman Ehsan Jaya
- Taman Desa Jaya
- Taman Bestari Indah
- Taman Pelangi Indah
- Taman Bukit Jaya
- Taman Bestari Indah
- Taman Putri Park
- Taman Gaya
- Taman Berlian
- Taman Baiduri
- Taman Muhibbah

== Education ==
- SK Desa Cemerlang
- SK Taman Bukit Tiram
- SK Taman Pelangi Indah
- SK Taman Puteri Wangsa
- SK Ulu Tiram
- SJK(C) Ban Foo
- SJK(C) Pei Chih
- SJK(C) Tiram
- SJK(T) Desa Cemerlang
- SJK(T) Ladang Ulu Tiram
- SMK Sungai Tiram
- SMK Taman Desa Cemerlang
- SMK Taman Pelangi Indah
- SMK Taman Puteri Wangsa
- SMK Ulu Tiram
- Crescendo Help International School
- Crescendo International College

== Shopping ==
=== Today's Mall ===
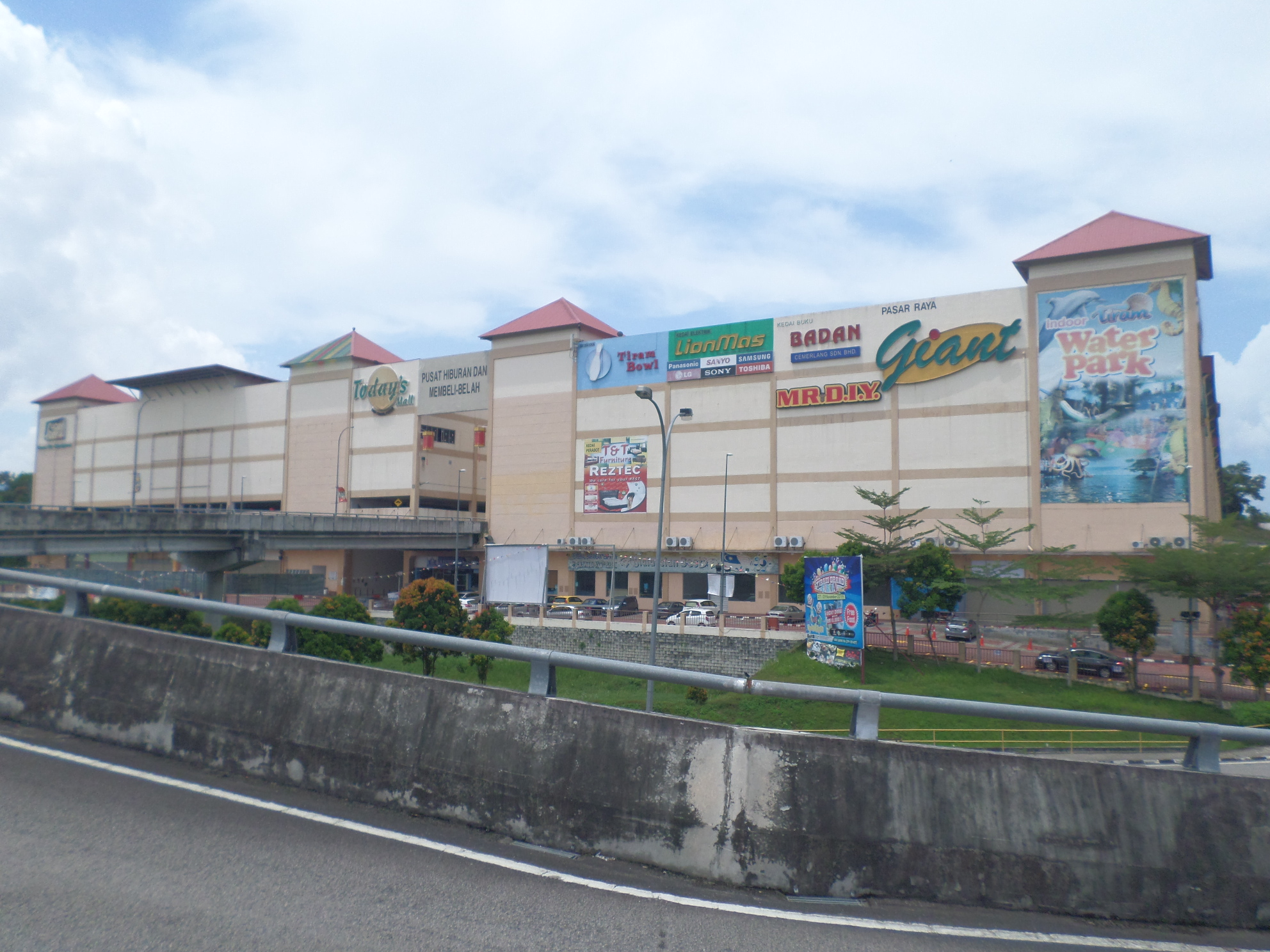
Today's Mall

Today's Mall is a 3-storey fully air-conditioned contemporary shopping center, covering almost 10 acres (40,000 m^{2}) of land. Its gross built up area is approximately 800,000 square feet (74,000 m^{2}). The premises provided more than 1,000 free car parks, with 24 hours security, made up of 250 shop lots, and areas designated for exhibition, promotion, kiosks, booths, etc. Today's Mall also housed the first 3D cinema in Johor Bahru and an indoor water theme park. It currently lays abandoned in 2019 due to low population in the area.

=== NSK Trade City ===
NSK Trade City is a single level hypermarket located in the Town Centre of Ulu Tiram and is attached with a McDonald's. The total built up area of NSK Trade City is 110,000 sq ft (10,000 m^{2}). with a combination of a wet and dry market consisting of around 50 retail shops and kiosks under one roof. A total of 1,000 free car parks are available in the NSK Trade City compound.

== Transportation ==
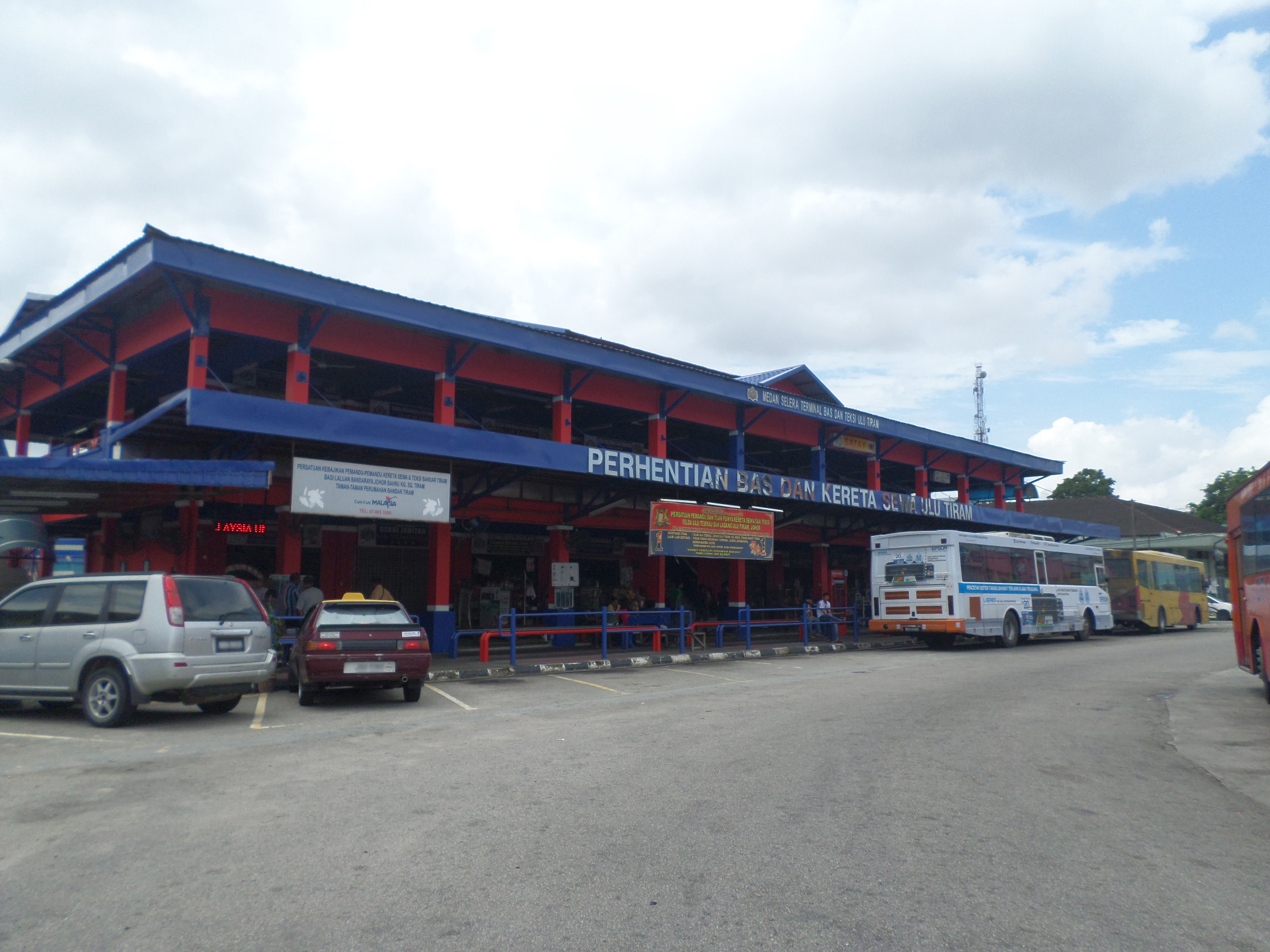
Ulu Tiram Bus and Taxi Terminal

The suburb houses the Ulu Tiram Bus and Taxi Terminal. It is accessible by Causeway Link route 6B from Johor Bahru Sentral railway station.
