= Kota Tinggi =

Coordinates: 1°44′N 103°54′E

- Town and district capital
- Kota Tinggi, the Historic Town of Johor; Kota Tinggi, Bandar Bersejarah Johor
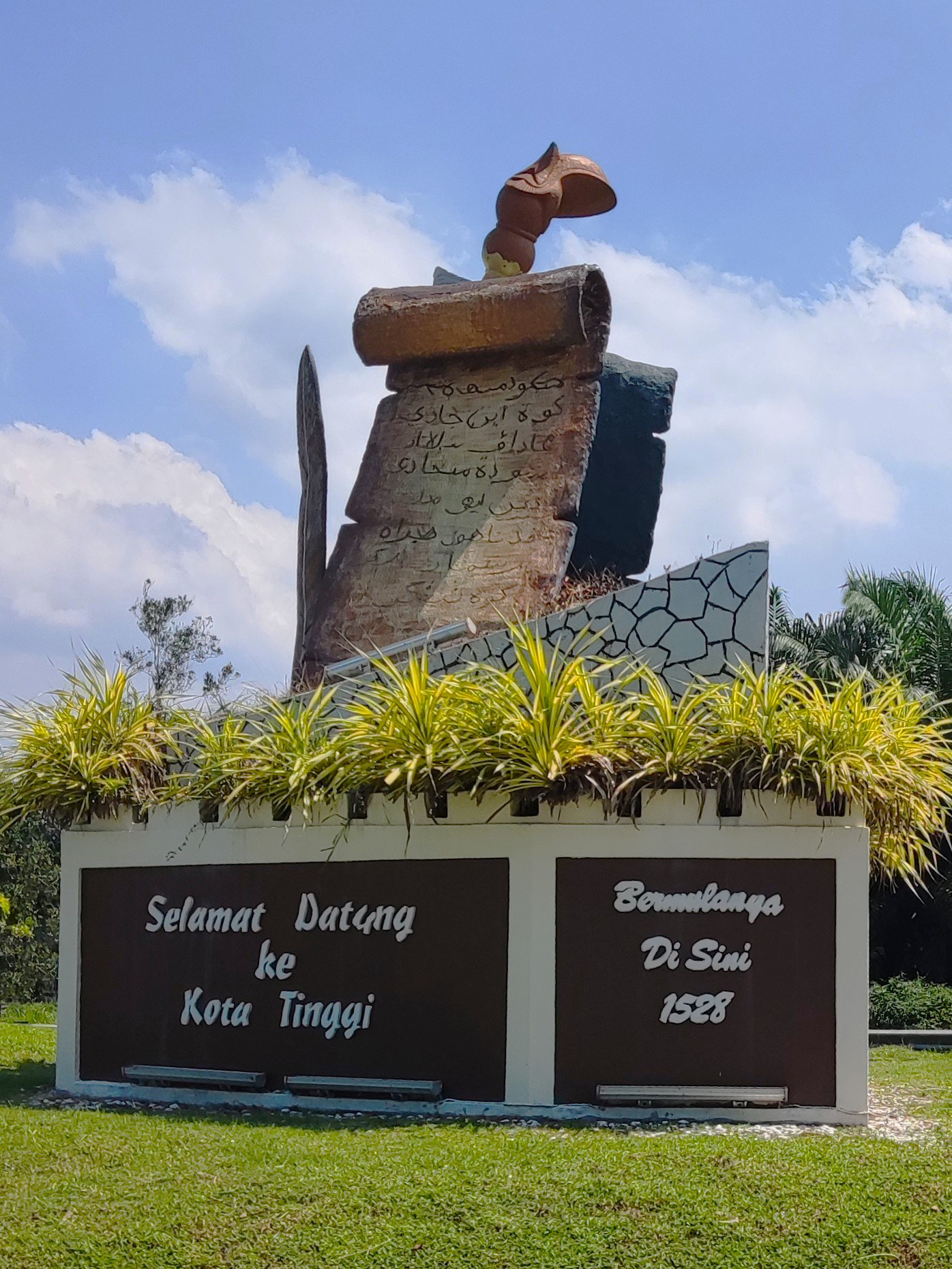
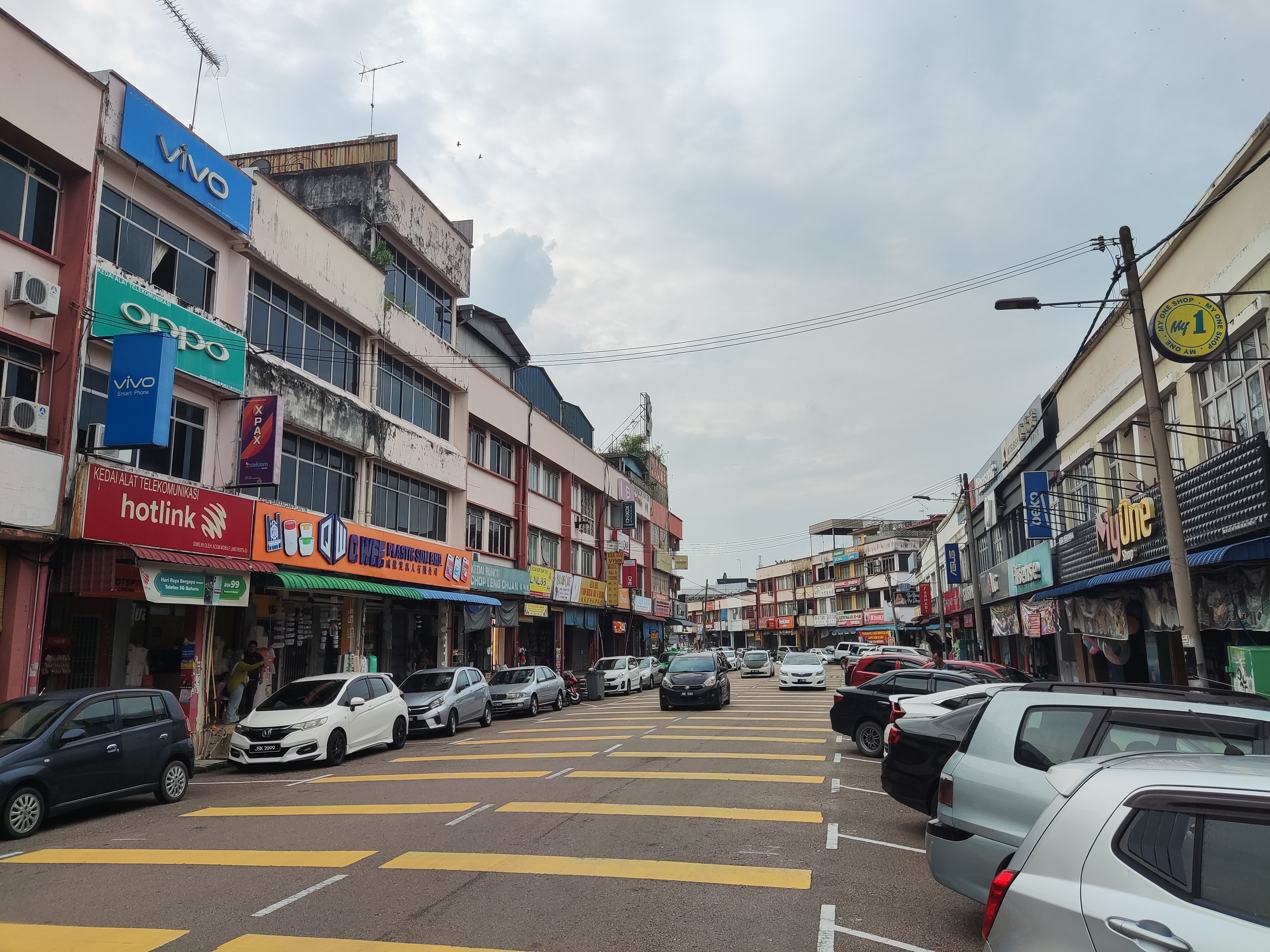
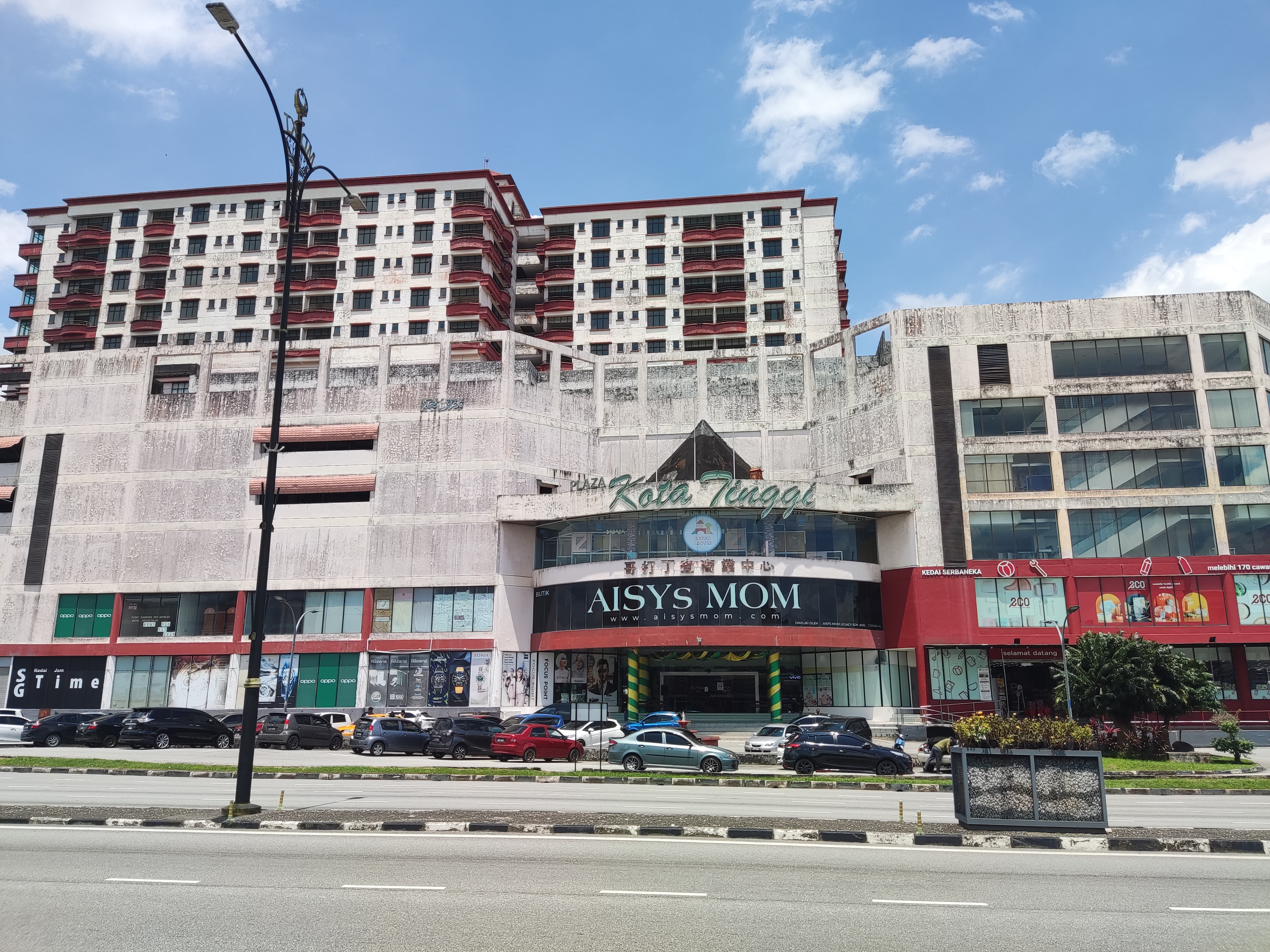
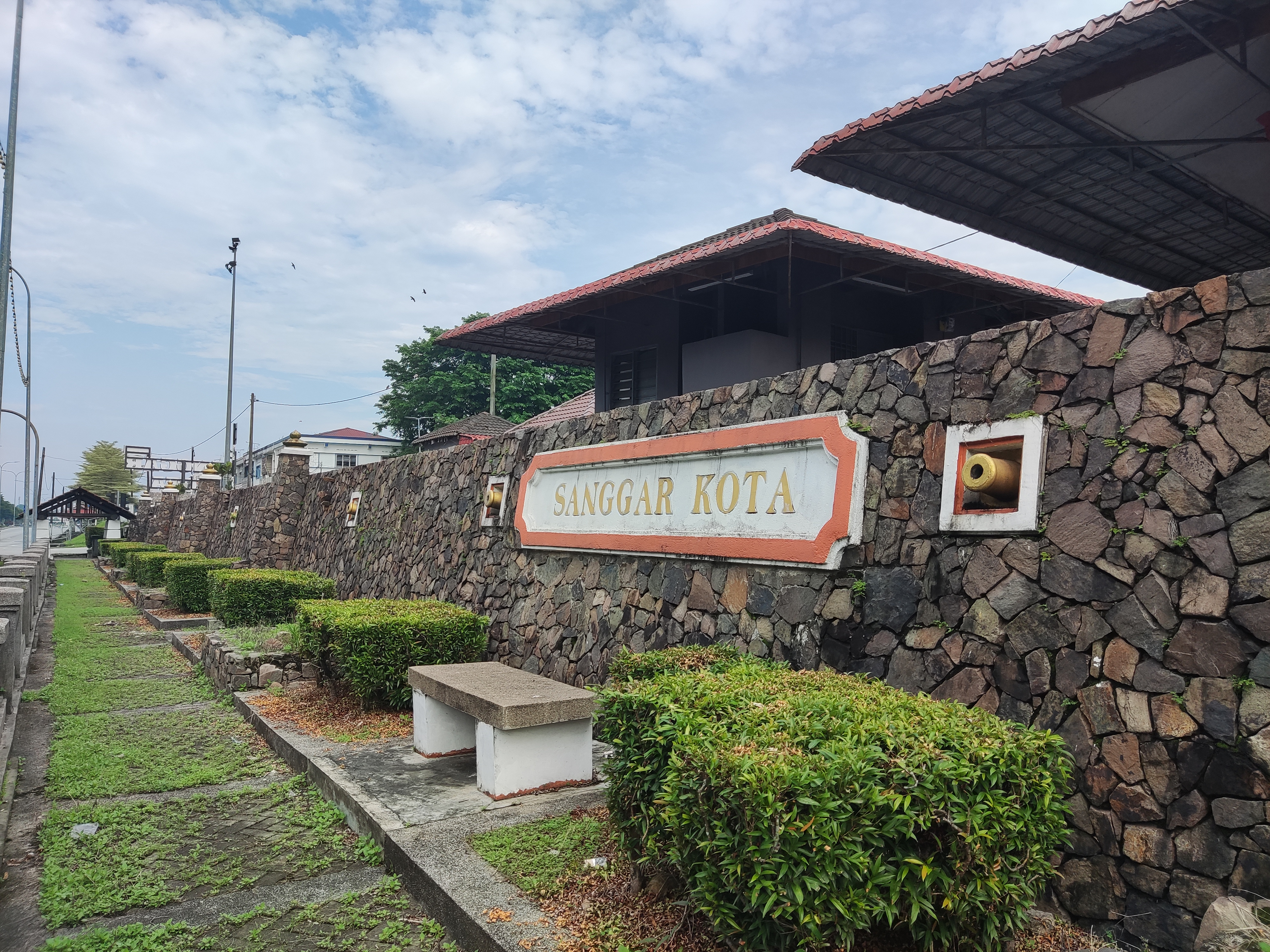
- Landmark Jalan Jaafar Kota Tinggi Plaza Sanggar Kota

- Coat of arms
- Motto(s): Harmoni, Berbudaya "Harmonious, Cultural" (motto of Kota Tinggi District Council)
- Interactive map of Kota Tinggi
- Country: Malaysia
- State: Johor
- District: Kota Tinggi

Government
  - Type: Local government
  - Body: Kota Tinggi District Council
  - President: Khairul Hafiz Mohammad (since 21 March 2025)

Area
  - Total: 17 km^{2} (6.6 sq mi)
- Time zone: UTC+8 (MST)
  - Summer (DST): Not observed
- Postcode: 81xxx
- Area code: 07
- Vehicle registration: J
- Website: www.mdkt.gov.my

Kota Tinggi District Council Majlis Daerah Kota Tinggi
- Emblem

Type
- Type: Local authority of Kota Tinggi

History
- Founded: 1 January 1977

Leadership
- President: Khairul Hafiz Mohamad@Mazlan (since 21 March 2025)
- Secretary: Nurul Aishah Mohamadon

Structure
- Seats: 24
- Political groups: Councillors: BN (24): UMNO (14); MCA (8); MIC (2)
- Length of term: 1 April 2024–31 December 2025

Motto
- Harmoni, Berbudaya (Harmonious, Cultural)

Meeting place
- Jalan Padang, 81900 Kota Tinggi, Johor.

Website
- www.mdkt.gov.my

Kota Tinggi is a town and the capital of Kota Tinggi District, Johor, Malaysia.

Kuala Sedili or Tanjung Sedili, a small fishing town located 37 km north-east of Kota Tinggi town, is the second largest fishing port in east coast of Peninsular Malaysia.

== History ==
Kota Tinggi was hardest hit in the flood that devastated Johor and some parts of Pahang, Malacca, and Negeri Sembilan. Nearly 100,000 people had to be evacuated to rescue centres.

The first flood wave started on 19 December 2006 and sunk almost the whole town of Kota Tinggi. With a height of 4.90 metres (16.1 ft), it broke the previous record flood level. The second wave, which began on 11 January 2007, at 5.45 metres (17.9 ft) exceeded even the height of the first wave. Kota Tinggi town was totally underwater for nearly two weeks and was isolated from other towns due to landslides and flooding.

== Geography ==
Kota Tinggi town in Kota Tinggi district

The town spans over an area of 17 km^{2}. Its landscape is mostly flat with the Johor River runs through it.

== Administration ==
Kota Tinggi town and the mukims of Kota Tinggi, Ulu Sungai Johor, Ulu Sedili Besar, Kambau and Sedili Besar are administered by Kota Tinggi District Council (Malay: Majlis Daerah Kota Tinggi) since 1 January 1977. While the initial coverage of the District Council is the entirety of Kota Tinggi District, the southern part of the district comprising Sedili Kechil, Johor Lama, Tanjung Surat, Pengerang and Pantai Timur mukims was separated from its jurisdiction area by the State Government on 16 January 2017 to form the Pengerang Local Authority Area, which later evolved into the Pengerang Municipality on 1 January 2020. This resulted in the Kota Tinggi District Council's administration area being reduced to only the northern portion of the District.

The higher administrator of this town called Pegawai Daerah (district officer), which is normally changed every 5–6 years as being promoted by the city council. His official home can be seen nearby the field of the city called Padang Kerajaan Kota Tinggi, near the highest building in Kota Tinggi, The Bangunan Sultan Iskandar. The building houses the district council offices.

=== Departments ===
- Management Services (Khidmat Pengurusan)
- Finance (Kewangan)
- Valuation & Property Management (Penilaian & Pengurusan Harta)
- Engineering (Kejuruteraan)
- Health & Licensing (Kesihatan & Pelesenan)
- Development Planning & Landscape (Perancangan Pembangunan & Landskap)
- Community Development (Pembangunan Masyarakat)
- Enforcement (Penguatkuasaan)

=== Units ===
- Internal Audit (Audit Dalam)
- Law (Undang-undang)
- Corporate & Public Relations (Korporat & Perhubungan Awam)
- One Stop Centre (Pusat Sehenti)
- Commissioner of Building (Pesuruhjaya Bangunan)

=== Administration areas (zones) ===
As of 2025, Kota Tinggi is divided into 24 zones represented by 24 councillors to act as mediators between residents and the district council. The councillors for the 1 April 2024 to 31 December 2025 session are as below:

Zone	Councillor	Political affiliation
Taman Sri Saujana 1	Nasaruddin Ahmad	UMNO
Taman Sri Saujana 2	Faridah Husin	UMNO
Taman Daiman Jaya	Yo Chin Xue	MCA
Taman Ahmad Perang	Tan Fei Sze	MCA
Taman Kemang	Samsudin Mohamad	UMNO
Taman Sri Lalang	Tan Kwang Hwa	MCA
PR1MA	Nur Abidah Sapar	UMNO
Kota Jaya 1	Mok Teck Fatt	MCA
Kota Jaya 2	Way Zhi Hong	MCA
Kota Jaya 3	Mohd Nasir Jamaludin	UMNO
Bandar Petri Jaya	Mohd Safiee Salam	UMNO
Kota Kecil 1	Sheikh Md Fahmi Sheikh Kassim	UMNO
Kota Kecil 2	Vadeveloo Suppiah	MIC
Bandar 1	Lim Yew Chian	MCA
Bandar 2	Mohamad Haziq Mohamadon	UMNO
Bandar 3	Wong Tien Yong	MCA
Tanjung Sedili	Hashim Muhammad	UMNO
FELCRA Semayong	Nor Azimah Mazlan	UMNO
Taman Pasak Indah	Rahimah Saiein	UMNO
Taman Bendahara	Mesran Tukiman	UMNO
Taman Hidayat	Yong Wai Mee	MCA
Taman Mawai	R Sanmugam N Ramaswami	MIC
Bandar Tenggara 2	Saiful Bahar Mohd Yunos	UMNO
Bandar Tenggara 1	Ahmad Sapari	UMNO

== Politics ==
Kota Tinggi is represented in the Dewan Rakyat of the Malaysian Parliament by Dato' Seri Mohamed Khaled Nordin from UMNO, part of the federal ruling alliance Barisan Nasional.

On the state level, Kota Tinggi constituency contributes two seats to the Johor State Legislative Assembly:

- Sedili; and
- Johor Lama,

in which both seats were also represented by UMNO.

== Tourist attractions ==
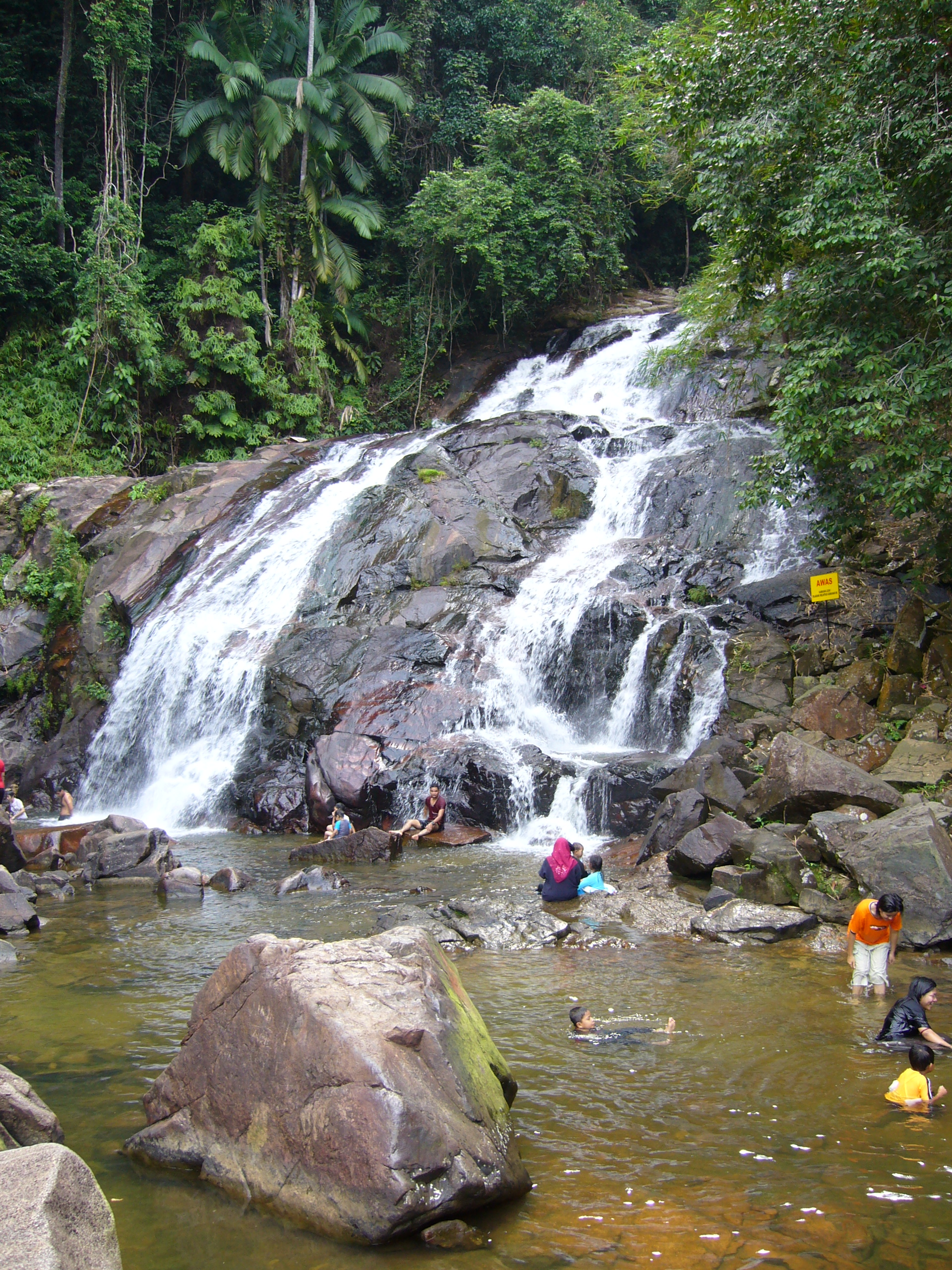
Kota Tinggi waterfalls at Lombong

Kota Tinggi is known as a historical town because the Sultanate of Johor was established there. Many historical tombs are found here including the Sultan Mahmud Mangkat Di Julang Mausoleum, Makam Bendahara Tun Habib Abdul Majid and Makam Tauhid in Kampung Makam. Makam Laksamana Bentan is located in Kampung Kelantan.

The Kota Tinggi Waterfalls at Lombong, 16 kilometres (9.9 mi) north-west of town, are local tourist destinations.

The waterfalls are 36 meters high, and are located at the base of the 634 meter high Gunung Muntahak mountain. The river water drains through a series of shallow pools used for swimming. The natural environment of some parts of the location has somewhat been spoiled by resort development with artificial landscaping.

There are also many beaches along the coastal part of Kota Tinggi. The most popular beaches are Tanjung Balau, Desaru and Batu Layar ('sail rock'), which are 58 km, 55 km, and 62 km from Kota Tinggi town respectively. Chalets and hotels offering reasonable rates can easily be found along the beach.

Teluk Sengat, located 25 km east of Kota Tinggi town, is a village visited by tourists for its seafood.

Museums in Kota Tinggi include Kota Tinggi Museum.

== Transportation ==
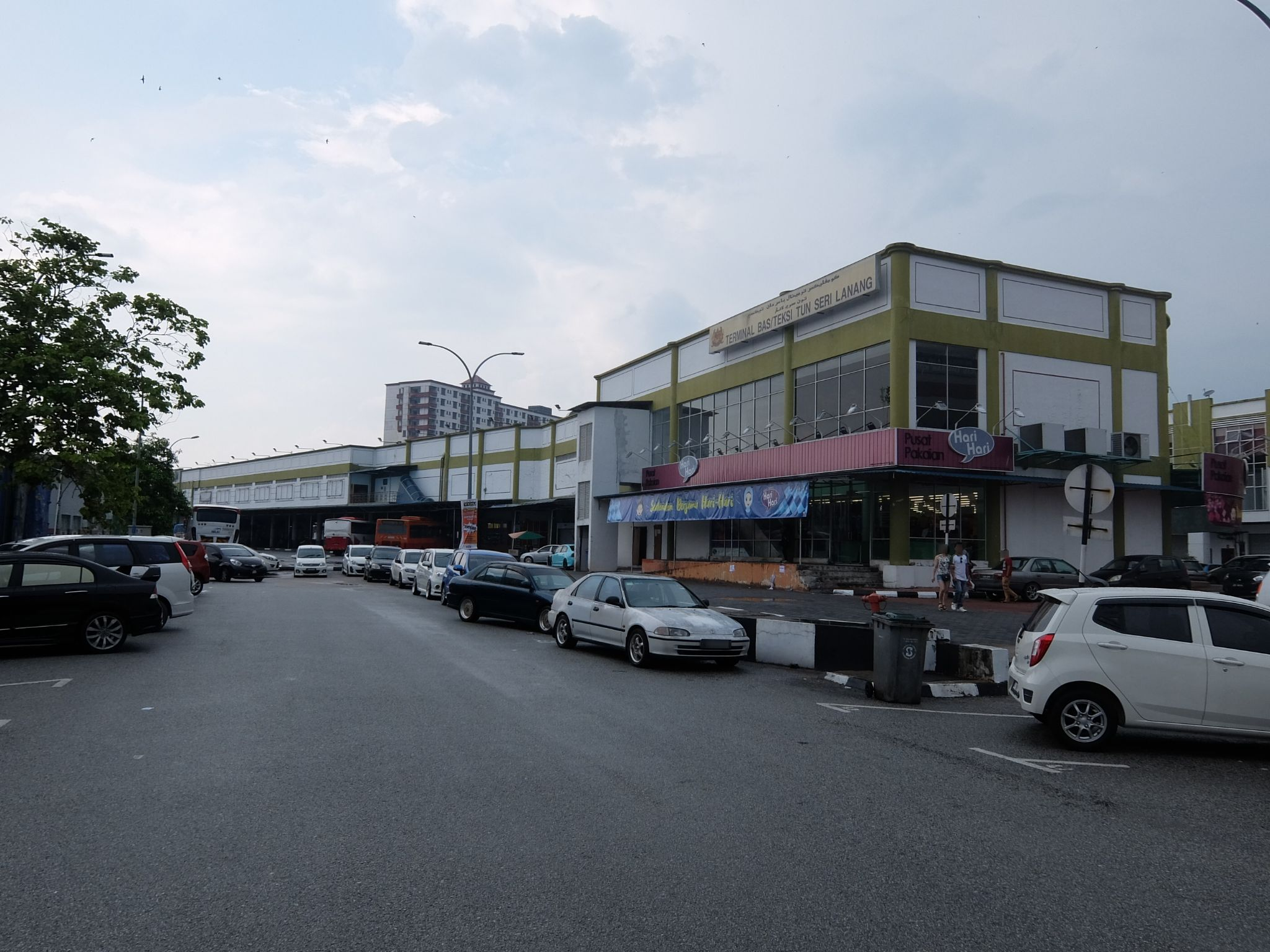
Tun Seri Lanang bus and taxi terminal

=== Road ===
The town is accessible by bus from Johor Bahru Sentral (6B, 41, 227), Larkin Sentral (66, 227). or by Causeway Link route 6B.

Federal Route 3, Federal Route 91 and Federal Route 92 intersect at Kota Tinggi. Federal Route 3 is the main highway linking Johor Bahru to the east coast cities of Kuantan (Pahang), Kuala Terengganu (Terengganu) and Kota Bharu (Kelantan). Federal Route 91 connects Kota Tinggi to the railway town of Kluang while Federal Route 92 joins Kota Tinggi to Pengerang. Federal Route 94 also connects Kota Tinggi to Kulai. North–South Expressway Southern Route has an interchange in Kulai to connects Kota Tinggi from Kuala Lumpur.
