= Lombong =

Place in Kota Tinggi, Johor, Malaysia

Coordinates: 1°48′N 103°51′E

Lombong (the mine) is a place in Kota Tinggi District, Johor, Malaysia.
