= Bandar Tenggara =

- Location within Johor
- Coordinates: 1°52′N 103°37′E
- Negara: Malaysia
- Negeri: Johor
- District: Kota Tinggi

Bandar Tenggara is a town in Kota Tinggi District, Johor, Malaysia.

== History ==
Similar to Bandar Penawar, the township was established around the year 1972 by Lembaga Kemajuan Johor Tenggara (Southeast Johor Development Authority) (KEJORA).

== Geology ==
The town is surrounded by oil palm estate.

== Geography ==
The town spans over an area of 20 km^{2}.

== Economy ==
The industrial development especially in the manufacturing sector and small and medium industries here growth rapidly due to its strategic position that links between the regions centre of Kulai, Kota Tinggi and Kluang.

== Education ==
=== Secondary school ===
- Sekolah Menengah Kebangsaan Bandar Tenggara 2
- Sekolah Menengah Kebangsaan Bandar Tenggara
- Sekolah Menengah Kebangsaan Seri Pinang
- Sekolah Menengah Agama Bandar Tenggara

=== Primary school ===
- Sekolah Kebangsaan Bandar Tenggara 1
- Sekolah Kebangsaan Felda Sungai Sibol
- Sekolah Kebangsaan Felda Pengeli Timur
- Sekolah Kebangsaan Bandar Tenggara 2
