= Johor =

State of Malaysia

- State
- State and Subject Territory of Johor; Negeri dan Jajahan Takluk Johor Darul Ta'zim (Malay)
- Flag Coat of arms
- Nickname(s): Darul Ta'zim ("Abode of Dignity")
- Motto: Kepada Allah Berserah ("To Allah We Surrender")
- Anthem: Lagu Bangsa Johor ("Johor State Anthem")
- Johor in Malaysia
- Country: Malaysia
- Anglo–Johor Treaty: 1885
- Johor State Constitution: 14 April 1895
- British protected states: 1914
- Japanese occupation: 1942
- Accession into the Federation of Malaya: 1948
- Malayan Declaration of Independence: 31 August 1957
- Proclamation of Malaysia: 16 September 1963
- Capital and largest city: Johor Bahru; 01°27′20″N 103°45′40″E
- Royal capital: Muar
- Official languages: Malay
- Common languages: Malay, English, Mandarin, Tamil, others
- Ethnic groups (2020): 60.1% Bumiputera; 32.8% Chinese; 6.6% Indian; 0.5% Other ethnicities
- Religion (2020): 59.7% Sunni Islam (official); 28.7% Buddhism; 7.1% Hinduism; 3.0% Christianity; 0.8% Other religions; 0.7% No religion
- Demonym(s): Johorean
- Government: Federated parliamentary constitutional monarchy
  - Sultan: Ibrahim Ismail ibni Iskandar
  - Chief Minister: Onn Hafiz Ghazi (BN–UMNO)
- Legislature: Legislative Assembly

Area
  - Total: 19,166 km^{2} (7,400 sq mi)
- Highest elevation (Mount Ledang): 1,276 m (4,186 ft)

Population
  - 2020 census: 4,009,670 (2020)
  - Density: 209.2/km^{2} (541.8/sq mi)
- GDP (PPP): 2025 estimate
  - Total: $149,274 billion
  - Per capita: $35,316
- GDP (nominal): 2025 estimate
  - Total: $47,433 billion
  - Per capita: $11,222
- Gini (2022): ▲0.366 low
- HDI (2024): ▲0.811 very high · 9th
- Currency: Malaysian ringgit (RM/MYR)
- Time zone: UTC+8 (Malaysian Time)
- Date format: dd-mm-yyyy
- Driving side: Left
- Calling code: 07; 06 (Muar and Tangkak)
- Postal code: 79xxx to 86xxx, 73400
- ISO 3166 code: MY-01, 21–24
- Website: johor.gov.my

Johor (Note: Malay pronunciation: [ˈd͡ʒoho(r)]) is a state of Malaysia in the south of the Malay Peninsula. It borders with Pahang, Malacca and Negeri Sembilan to the north. Johor has maritime borders with Singapore to the south and Indonesia to the east and west. As of 2025, the state's population is 4.2 million, making it the second most populous state in Malaysia, after Selangor. Johor Bahru is the state capital city and the economic centre, while Muar serves as the royal capital.

Johor is one of Malaysia's most important economic hubs, having the highest gross domestic product (GDP) in Malaysia outside of the Klang Valley, making it the country's second largest state economy. Its household income and total salaries are also the second highest among all Malaysian states. Johor has the world's second largest artificial intelligence hub, robust manufacturing and logistics centres, and home to the Ports of Johor, the 11th busiest port in the world. Located in southern Johor, Iskandar Malaysia is Malaysia's largest special economic zone by investment value.

Johor's history began with the Johor Sultanate, a rump state of the Malacca Sultanate, becoming a sovereign state until European powers intervened. The Anglo-Dutch Treaty of 1824 established its modern borders, with Johor remaining self-governing until British influence grew in 1885 through a General Adviser. In 1914, it became a British protected state within the Unfederated Malay States, which was then interrupted by Japanese occupation. After World War II, Johor joined the Malayan Union in 1946 and the Federation of Malaya in 1948, ultimately gaining independence in 1957 before integrating into modern Malaysia in 1963.

Johor has high diversity in ethnicity, culture, language, and is known for its traditional dance of zapin and kuda kepang. The head of state is the Sultan of Johor, while the head of government is the Chief Minister. The government system is closely modelled on the Westminster system. Johor is divided into administrative districts, with Johor Bahru District being the second largest district in Malaysia by population and economy. Islam is the state religion, but other religions can be freely practised. Johor has diverse tropical rainforests and an equatorial climate. Situated at the southern foothills of the Tenasserim Hills, inselbergs and massifs dominate the state's flat landscape, with Mount Ledang being the highest point.

== Etymology ==
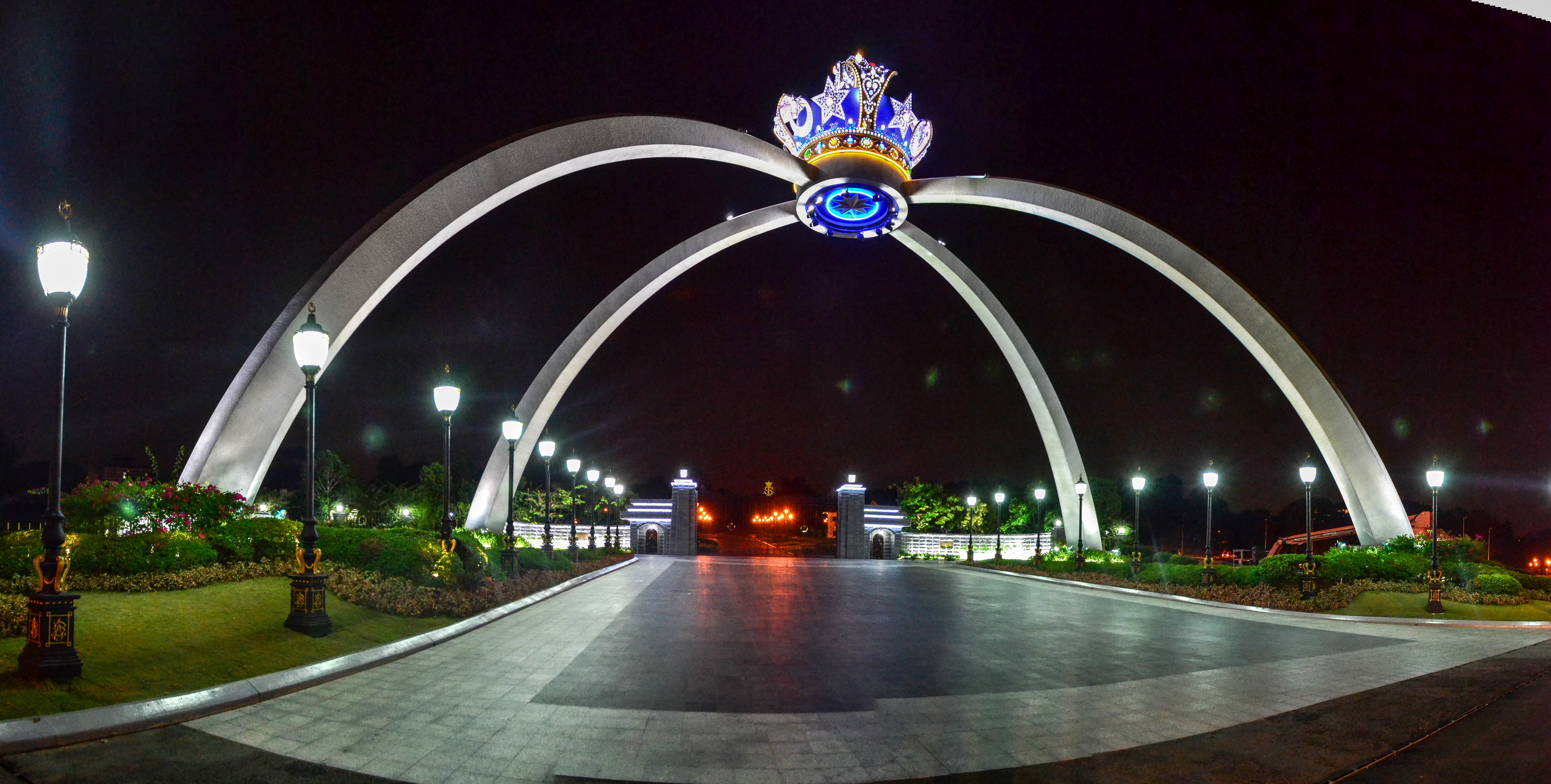
The Royal Crown in Istana Bukit Serene, Johor, dubbed the "Jewel"

The area was first known to the northern inhabitants of Siam as Gangganu or Ganggayu (Treasury of Gems) due to the abundance of gemstones near the Johor River. Arab traders referred to it as جَوْهَر (jauhar), a word borrowed from the Persian گوهر (gauhar), which also means 'precious stone' or 'jewel'. As the local people found it difficult to pronounce the Arabic word in the local dialect, the name subsequently became Johor. Meanwhile, the Old Javanese eulogy of Nagarakretagama called the area Ujong Medini ('land's end'), as it is the southernmost point of mainland Asia. Another name, through Portuguese writer Manuel Godinho de Erédia, made reference to Marco Polo's sailing to Ujong Tanah (the end of the Malay Peninsula land) in 1292. Both Ujong Medini and Ujong Tanah had been mentioned since before the foundation of the Sultanate of Malacca. Throughout the period, several other names also co-existed such as Galoh, Lenggiu and Wurawari. Johor is also known by its Arabic honorific as دارالتّعظيم (Darul Ta'zim) or 'Abode of Dignity'.

== History ==
=== Hindu-Buddhist Era ===
A bronze bell estimated to be from 150 AD was found in Kampong Sungai Penchu near the Muar River. The bell is believed to have been used as a ceremonial object rather than a trade object as a similar ceremonial bell with the same decorations was found in Battambang province, Cambodia, suggesting that the Malay coast came in contact with Funan, with the bell being a gift from the early kingdom in mainland Asia to local chieftains in the Malay Peninsula. Another important archaeological find was the ancient lost city of Kota Gelanggi, which was discovered by following trails described in an old Malay manuscript once owned by Stamford Raffles. Artefacts gathered in the area have reinforced claims of early human settlement in the state. The claim of Kota Gelanggi as the first settlement is disputed by the state government of Johor, with other evidence from archaeological studies conducted by the state heritage foundation since 1996 suggesting that the historic city is actually located in Kota Tinggi District at either Kota Klang Kiu or Ganggayu. The exact location of the ancient city is still undisclosed, but is said to be within the 14,000-hectare (34,595-acre) forest reserve where the Lenggiu and Madek Rivers are located, based on records in the Malay Annals that, after conquering Gangga Negara, Raja Suran from Siam of the Nakhon Si Thammarat Kingdom (Ligor Kingdom) had sailed to Ganggayu. Since ancient times, most of the coastal Malay Peninsula has had their own rulers, but all fell under the jurisdiction of Siam.

=== Sultanate of Johor ===
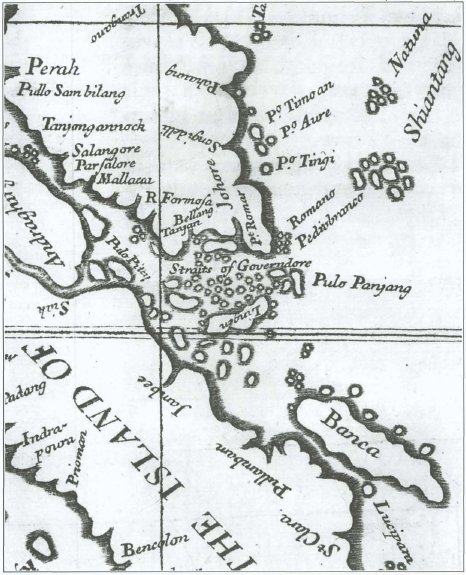
Map of the Dominion of Johor, 1727

After the fall of Malacca in 1511 to the Portuguese, the Johor Sultanate was established by Sultan Mahmud Shah of Malacca's son, Ala'udin Ri'ayat Shah II, in 1528 when he moved the royal court to the Johor River and set up his royal residence in Johor Lama. Johor became an empire spanning the southern Malay Peninsula, Riau Archipelago (including Singapore), Anambas Islands, Tambelan Archipelago, Natuna Islands, a region around the Sambas River in south-western Borneo and Siak in Sumatra with Pahang, Aru and Champa as allies. It aspired to retake Malacca from the Portuguese which the Aceh Sultanate in northern Sumatra also aspired to do leading to a three-way war among the rivals. During the wars, Johor's administrative capital moved several times based on military strategies and to maintain authority over trading in the region. Johor and the Portuguese began to collaborate against Aceh, which they saw as a common enemy. In 1582 the Portuguese helped Johor thwart an attack by Aceh, but the arrangement ended when Johor attacked the Portuguese in 1587. Aceh continued its attacks against the Portuguese, and only ceased when a large armada from the Portuguese port in Goa came to defend Malacca and destroy the sultanate.

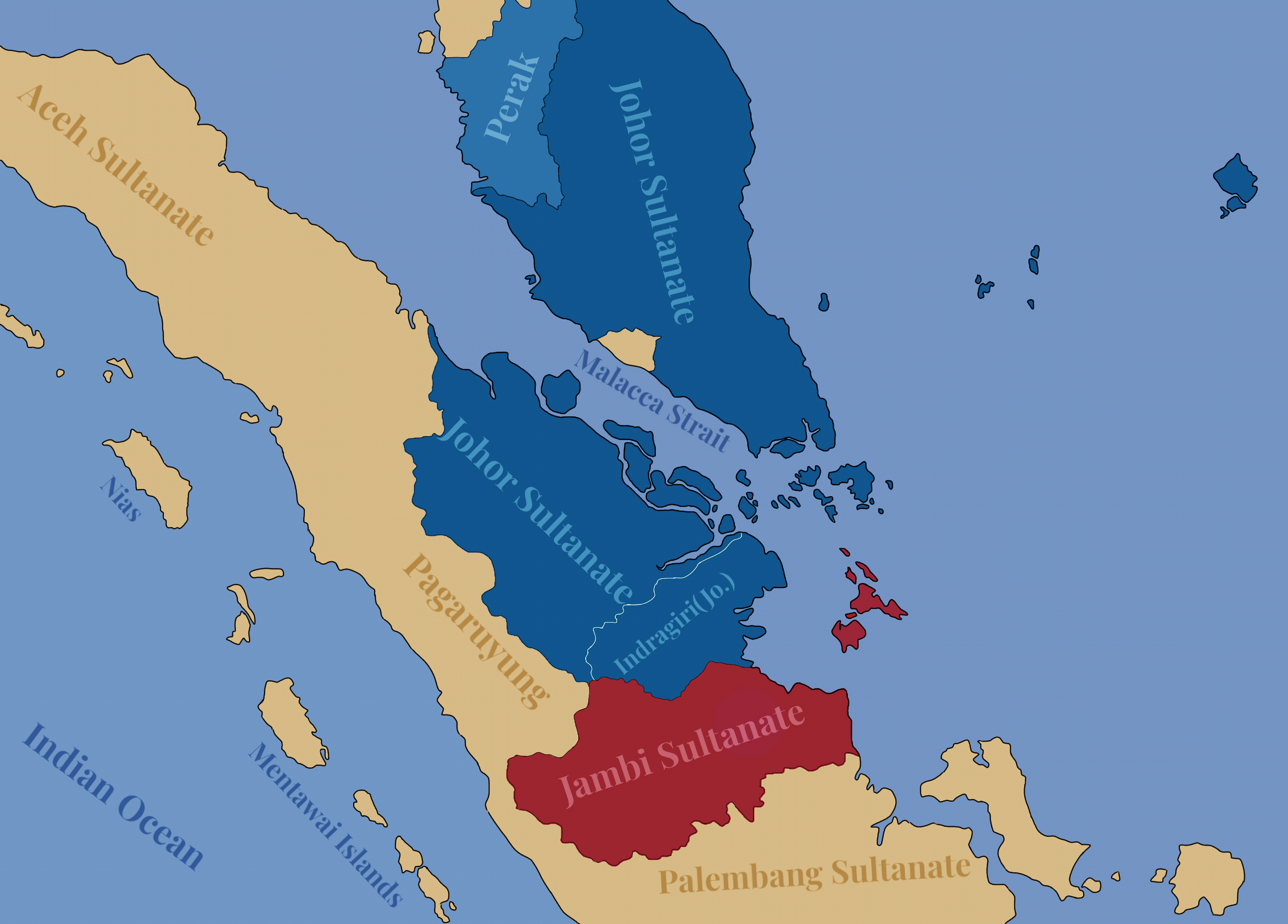
The extent of Johor and Jambi influence throughout the Johor–Jambi wars

After Aceh was left weakened, the Dutch East India Company (VOC) arrived and Johor formed an alliance with them to eliminate the Portuguese in the 1641 capture of Malacca. Johor regained authority over many of its former dependencies in Sumatra, such as Siak (1662) and Indragiri (1669), which had fallen to Aceh while Malacca was taken by the Dutch. Malacca was placed under the direct control of Batavia in Java. Although Malacca fell under Dutch authority, the Dutch did not establish any further trading posts in the Malay Peninsula and Sumatra, as they had more interest in Java and the Maluku Islands. The Dutch only become involved with local disputes when the Bugis began to threaten their maritime trade.

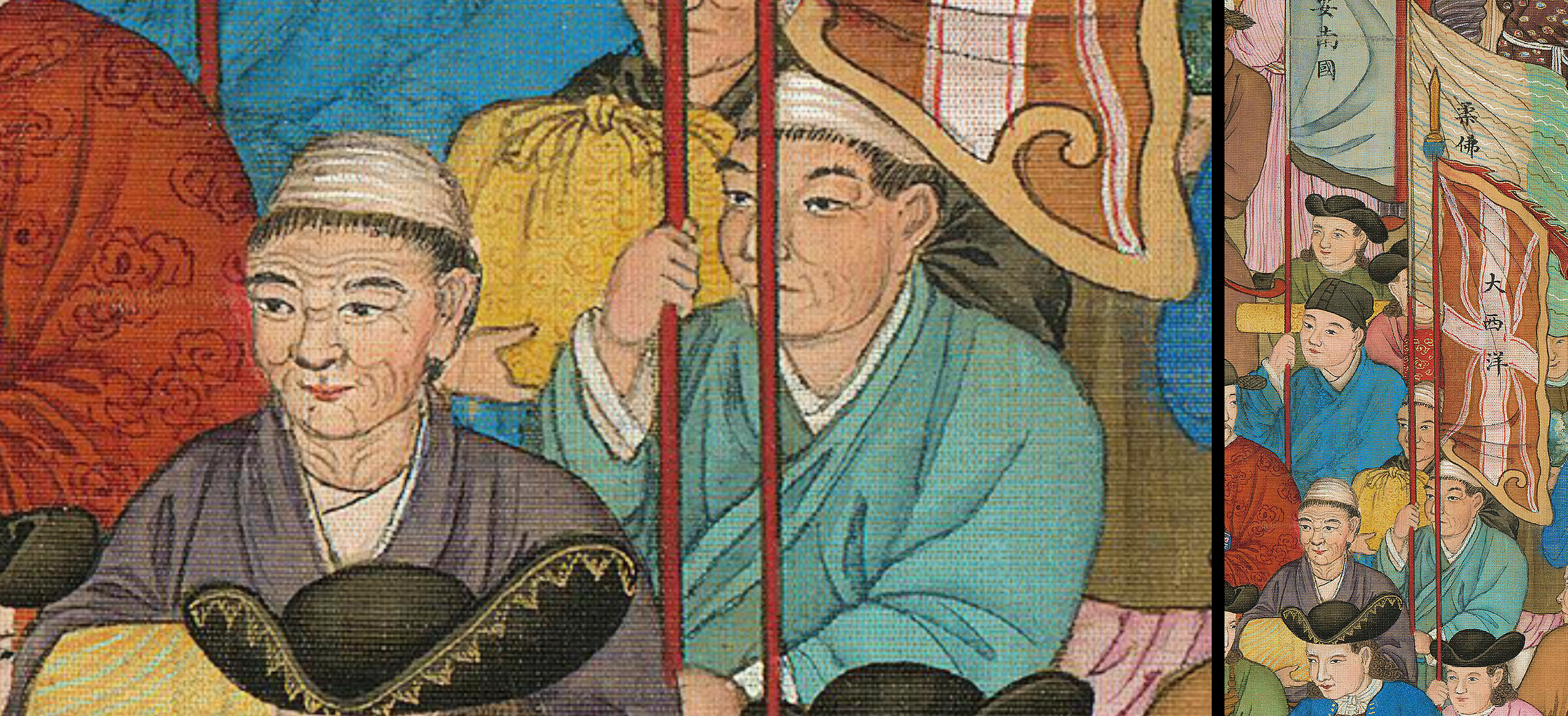
Johor (柔佛国) delegates in Beijing, China, in 1761. 万国来朝图

The dynasty that descended from the rulers of Malacca lasted until the death of Mahmud II, when it was succeeded by the Bendahara dynasty, a dynasty of ministers who had previously served in the Malacca Sultanate. The Dutch felt increasingly threatened in the 18th century, especially when the English East India Company started to establish a presence in the northern Malay Peninsula, leading the Dutch to seize the Bugis areas of Riau and expel the Bugis from both Riau and Selangor so these areas would not fall under British rule. This ended Bugis political domination in the Johor-Pahang-Riau empire, resulting in the Bugis being banned from Riau in 1784. During the rivalry between the Bugis and Dutch, Mahmud Shah III concluded a treaty of protection with the VOC on board the HNLMS Utrecht and the sultan was allowed to reside in Riau with Dutch protection. Since then, mistrust between the Bugis and Malay escalated. From 1796 to 1801 and from 1807 to 1818, Malacca was placed under British Residency as the Netherlands were conquered by France in the Napoleonic Wars and was returned to the Dutch in 1818. Malacca served as the staging area for the British Invasion of Java in 1811.

=== British protected states ===
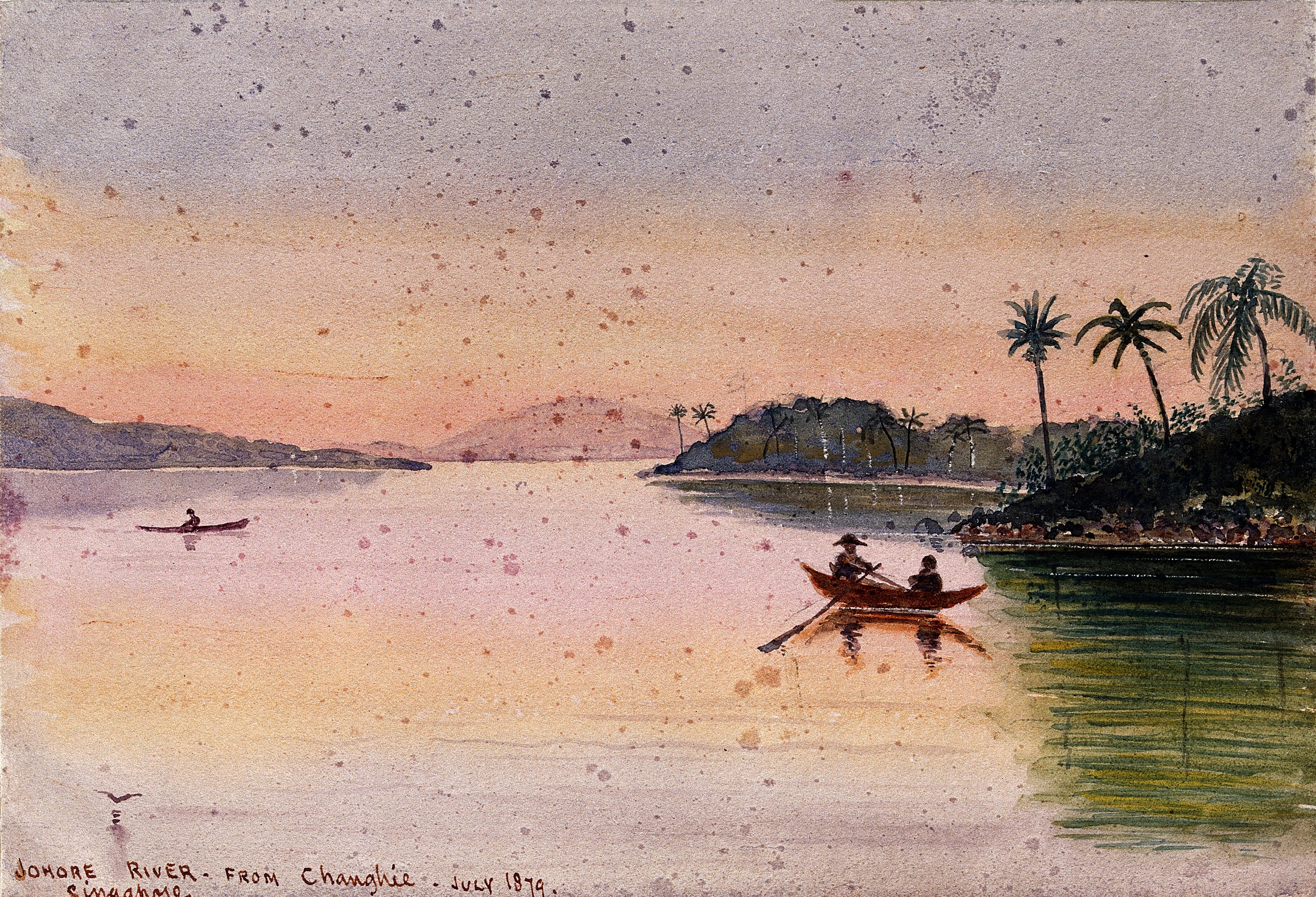
A painting by John Edmund Taylor showing people in rowboats on the Johor River in the evening seen from Changi in Singapore, July 1879

When Mahmud Shah III died the sultan left two sons through commoner mothers. While the elder son Hussein Shah was supported by the Malay community, the younger son Abdul Rahman Muazzam Shah was supported by the Bugis community. In 1818, the Dutch recognised Abdul Rahman Muazzam Shah as the legitimate heir to the Johor Empire in return for supporting their intention to establish a trading post in Riau. The following year, the British recognised Hussein Shah as the legitimate heir to the Johor Empire in return for supporting their intention to establish a trading post in Singapore. Before his death, Mahmud Shah III had appointed Abdul Rahman as the Temenggong for Johor with recognition from the British as the Temenggong of Johor-Singapore, marking the beginning of the Temenggong dynasty. Abdul Rahman was succeeded by his son, Daeng Ibrahim, although he was only recognised by the British 14 years later.

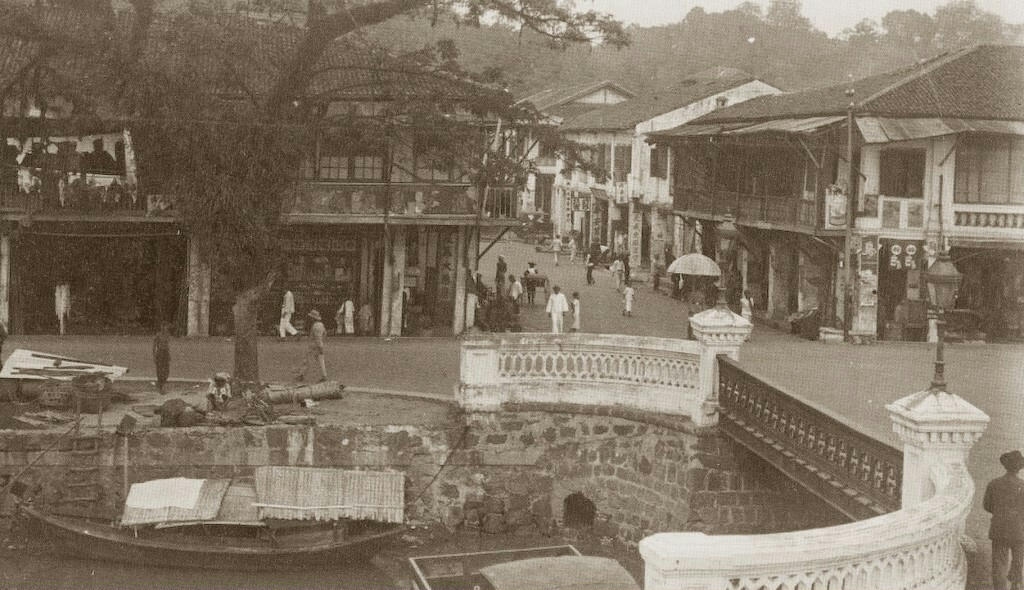
Johor Bahru town during the British period, circa 1920

With the partition of the Johor Empire due to the dispute between the Bugis and Malay and following the defined spheres of influence for the British and Dutch resulting from the Anglo-Dutch Treaty of 1824, Daeng Ibrahim intended to create a new administrative centre for the Johor Sultanate under the new dynasty. As he maintained a close relationship with the British and the latter wanted full control over trade in Singapore, a treaty was signed between Daeng Ibrahim and Hussein Shah's successor, Ali Iskandar, recognising Ali as the next sultan. Through the treaty, Ali was crowned as the sultan and received $5,000 (in Spanish dollars) and an allowance of $500 per month, but was required to cede the sovereignty of the territory of Johor (except Kesang of Muar, which would be the only territory under his control) to Daeng Ibrahim.

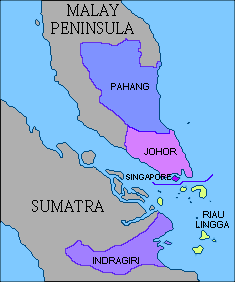
Partition of the Johor Empire before and after the Anglo-Dutch Treaty of 1824 Under British influence: Johor Sultanate Pahang Kingdom Singapore Under Dutch influence: Indragiri Sultanate Riau-Lingga Sultanate

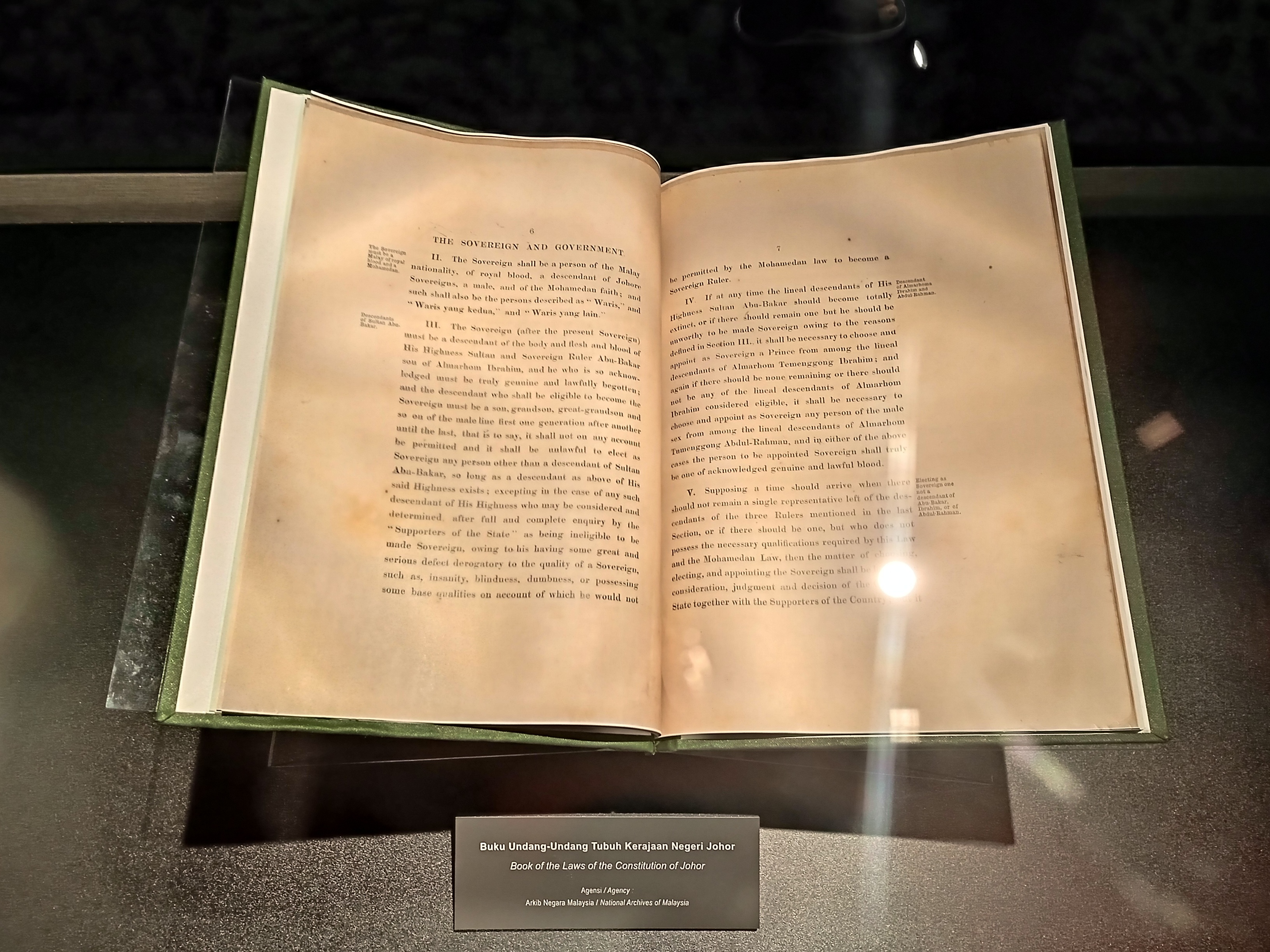
The first written constitution among the Malay states was Johor, namely Undang-undang Tubuh Negeri Johor by Abu Bakar

Following the establishment of a new capital in mainland Johor, the administrative centre was moved from Telok Blangah in Singapore. As the area was still an undeveloped jungle, the Temenggong encouraged the migration of Chinese and Javanese to clear the land and develop an agricultural economy in Johor. During Daeng Ibrahim's reign, Johor began to be modernised which was continued by his son, Abu Bakar. In 1885, an Anglo-Johor Treaty was signed that formalised the close relations between the two, with the British given transit rights for trade through Johor's territory and responsibility for its foreign relations, as well as providing protection to the latter. It was also in this year that Johor had formed its present-day boundary. The treaty also provided for the appointment of a British agent in an advisory role, although no advisor was appointed until 1910. Abu Bakar also implemented a constitution known as the Johor State Constitution (Malay: Undang-undang Tubuh Negeri Johor) and organised his administration in a British style. By adopting an English-style modernisation policy, Johor temporarily prevented itself from being directly controlled by the British, as happened to other Malay states.

Under the reign of Ibrahim, the British appointed Douglas Graham Campbell as an advisor to the sultanate in 1910, although the sultan only appointed Campbell as a General Adviser unlike in other Malayan states which had Resident Advisors, becoming the last Malay state to accept a British Adviser. However, due to Ibrahim's overspending, the sultanate faced problems caused by the falling price of its major source of revenue and problems between him and members of his state council, which gave the British an opportunity to intervene in Johor's internal affairs. Despite Ibrahim's reluctance to appoint a British adviser, Johor was brought under British control as one of the Unfederated Malay States by 1914, with the position of its General Adviser elevated to that of a Resident in the Federated Malay States.

=== Second World War ===
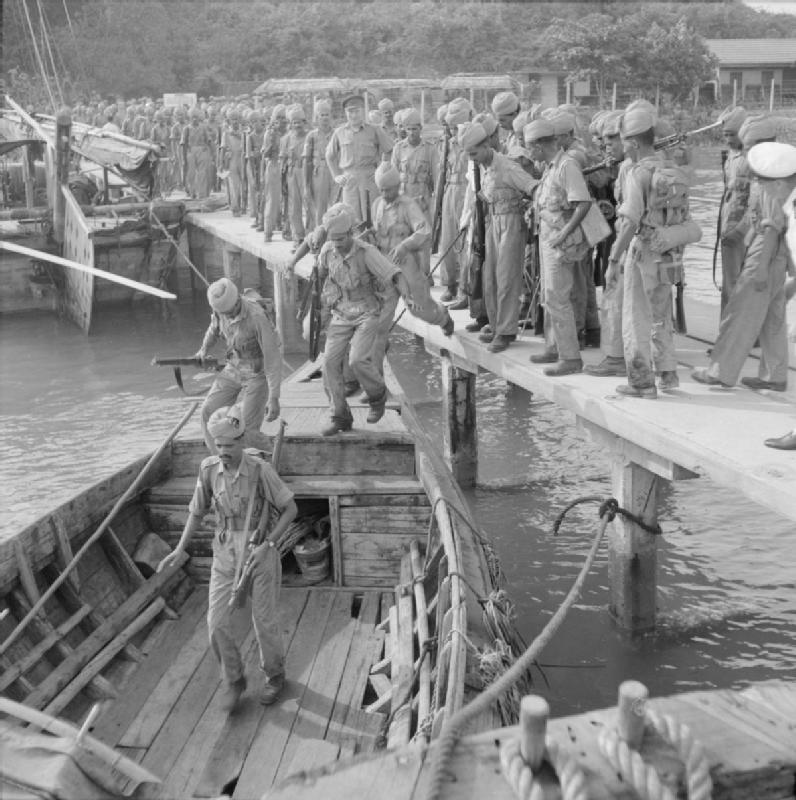
Indian troops embark onto boats during an invasion exercise in southern Johor, 13 November 1941

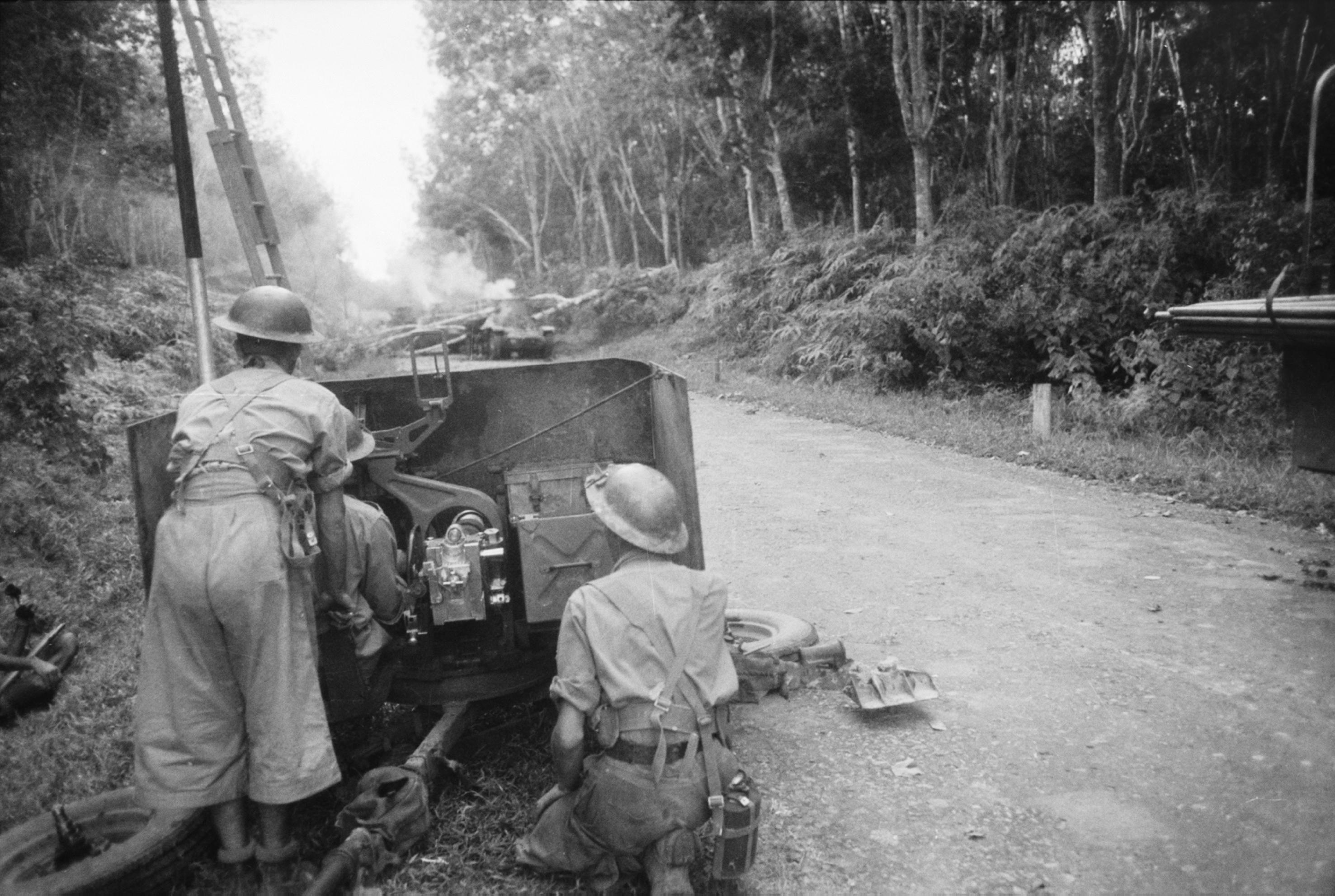
Three Australian 8th Division members firing on Japanese Type 95 Ha-Gō tanks on the Muar-Parit Sulong road during the Battle of Muar, 18 January 1942

Since the 1910s, Japanese planters had been involved in numerous estates and in the mining of mineral resources in Johor as a result of the Anglo-Japanese Alliance. After the First World War, rubber cultivation in Malaya was largely controlled by Japanese companies. Following the abolition of the Rubber Lands Restrictions (Enactment) in 1919, Gomu Nanyo Company (South Seas Rubber Co. Ltd.) began cultivating rubber in the interior of Johor. By the 1920s, Ibrahim had become a personal friend of Tokugawa Yoshichika, a member of the Tokugawa clan whose ancestors were military leaders (shōgun in Japanese) who ruled Japan from the 16th to the 19th centuries. In the Second World War, at a great cost of lives in the Battle of Muar in Johor as part of the Malayan Campaign, Imperial Japanese Army (IJA) forces with their bicycle infantry and tanks advanced into Muar District (present-day Tangkak District) on 14 January 1942. During the Japanese forces' arrival, Tokugawa accompanied General Tomoyuki Yamashita's troops and was warmly received by Ibrahim when they reached Johor Bahru at the end of January 1942. Yamashita and his officers stationed themselves at the Sultan's residence, Istana Bukit Serene, and the state secretariat building, Sultan Ibrahim Building, to plan for the invasion of Singapore. Some of the Japanese officers were worried since the location of the palace left them exposed to the British, but Yamashita was confident that the British would not attack since Ibrahim was also a friend to the British, which proved to be correct.

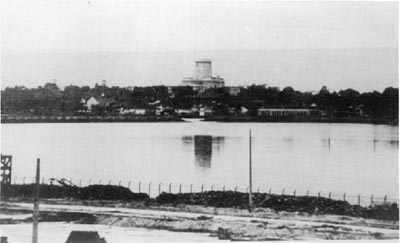
View of the blown up Johor–Singapore Causeway with the gap visible in the middle, which delayed the Japanese conquest of Singapore for over a week to 8 February 1942

On 8 February, the Japanese began to bombard the northwestern coastline of Singapore, which was followed by the crossing of the IJA 5th and 18th Divisions with around 13,000 troops through the Straits of Johor. The following day, the Imperial Guard Division crossed into Kranji while the remaining Japanese Guard troops crossed through the repaired Johor–Singapore Causeway. Following the occupation of all of Malaya and Singapore by the Japanese, Tokugawa proposed a reform plan by which the five kingdoms of Johor, Terengganu, Kelantan, Kedah-Penang and Perlis would be restored and federated. Under the scheme, Johor would control Perak, Selangor, Negeri Sembilan and Malacca while a 2,100-square-kilometre (800 sq mi) area in the southern part of Johor would be incorporated into Singapore for defence purposes. The five monarchs of the kingdoms would be obliged to pledge loyalty to Japan, would need to visit the Japanese royal family every two years, and would assure the freedom of religion, worship, employment and ownership of private property to all people and accord every Japanese person residing in the kingdoms with treatment equal to indigenous people.

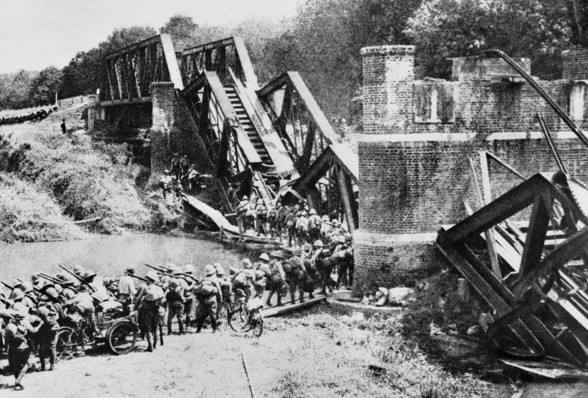
Additional Japanese troops advancing through an iron bridge in Labis which had been destroyed by the retreating British forces down the Malayan Peninsula, 22 January 1942

Meanwhile, Ōtani Kōzui of the Nishi Hongan-ji sub-sect of Jōdo Shinshū Buddhism suggested that the sultan system should be abolished and Japan should rule the Malay kingdoms under a Japanese constitutional monarchy government. Japanese War Minister Hideki Tōjō, however, had already reminded their government staff in Malaya to refrain from acting superior to the sultan and to pay respect so the sultan would co-operate with the gunsei (Japanese military organisation). In May, many high-ranking Japanese officials returned to Tokyo to consult with officials of the War Ministry and General Staff on how to deal with the Sultan. Upon their return to Singapore in July, they published a document called "A Policy for the Treatment of the Sultan", which was a demand for the Sultan to surrender his power over his people and land to the Japanese emperor through the IJA commander. The military organisation demanded the Sultan surrender his power in a manner reminiscent of the way the Tokugawa shogunate surrendered their power to the Japanese emperor in 1868. Through the Japanese administration, many massacres of civilians occurred with an estimate that 25,000 ethnic Chinese civilians in Johor perished during the occupation. In spite of that, the Japanese established the Endau Settlement (also known as the New Syonan Model Farm) in Endau for Chinese settlers to ease the food supply problem in Singapore.

=== Post-war and independence ===
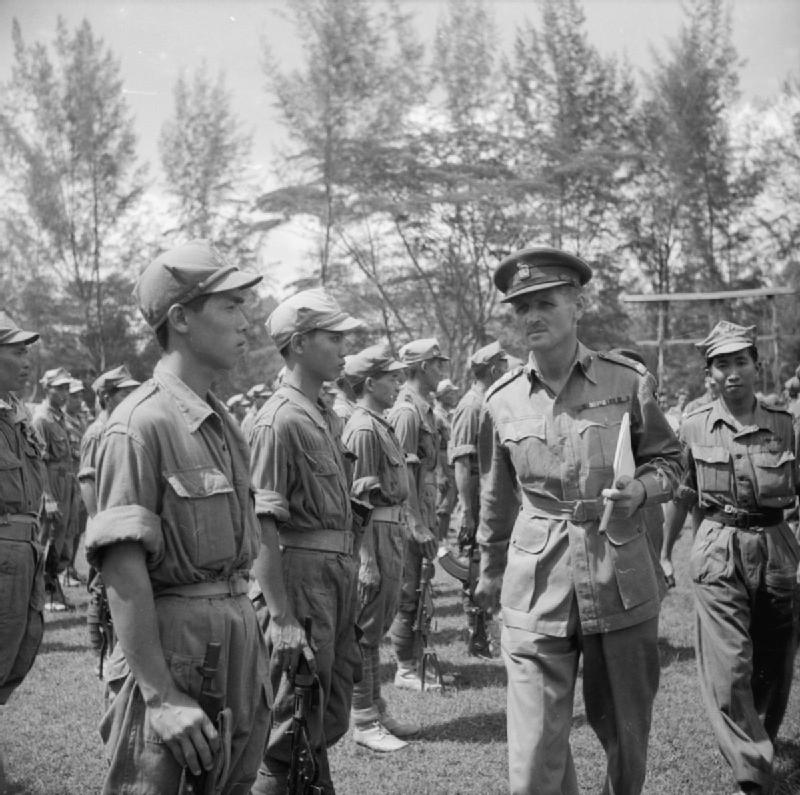
British Brigadier J J McCully inspects men of the 4th Regiment of the Malayan People's Anti-Japanese Army (MPAJA) guerrillas at Johor Bahru after the end of war against the Japanese, 1945

At the start of the war, the British had accepted an offer from the Communist Party of Malaya (CPM) to co-operate to fight the Japanese; to do this, the CPM formed the Malayan Peoples' Anti-Japanese Army (MPAJA). The CPM supporters were mostly Chinese-educated members discriminated against by the English-educated elite and the Babas (Straits-born Chinese) during British rule whose main objective was to gain independence from foreign empires and to establish a socialist state based on Marxism–Leninism similar to the People's Republic of China. The party also had Malay and Indian representatives. They advocated violence as a method of achieving their goals. Throughout their war against the Japanese, they also assassinated civilians suspected of collaborating with the Japanese, while kidnapped Malay women were used as comfort women, as had also been done by the Japanese. This led to retaliatory raids from some Malays affected by the attacks who decided to collaborate with the Japanese. This indirectly led to ethnic conflict, especially when ethnic propaganda was being made by both sides, leading to the deaths of more civilians. The Allied forces launched Operation Tiderace and Operation Zipper to liberate Malaya and Singapore. In the five weeks before the British resumed control over Malaya following the Japanese surrender on 16 August 1945, the MPAJA emerged as the de facto authority in the Malayan territory.

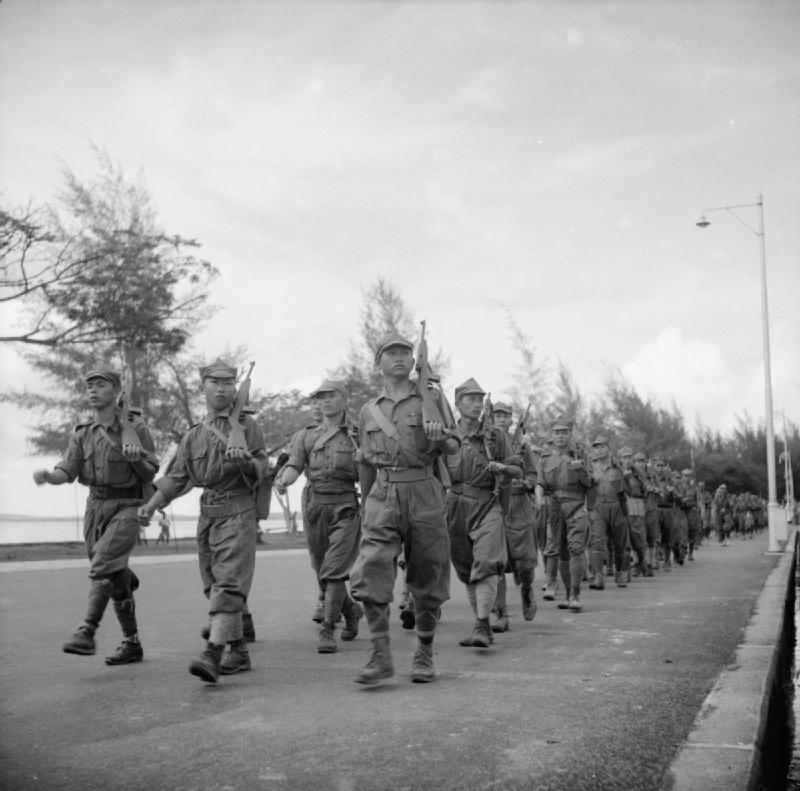
MPAJA guerrillas marching through the street of Johor Bahru during their disbandment ceremony in December 1945

Johor and the rest of Malaya were officially placed under the British Military Administration in September 1945 and the MPAJA was disbanded in December after its secretary-general, Lai Teck (who was also a double agent for the British), accepted the return of British colonial rule and adopted a moderate "open and legal" attitude towards progressing their goals with most members receiving medals from the British the following year. There was a dispute after the British had returned when Lai Teck disappeared with the CPM funds. The party administration was taken over by Chin Peng, who abandoned the "moderate strategy" in favour of a "people's revolutionary war", culminating in the Malayan Emergency of 1948. During the emergency period, large-scale attacks by the CPM occurred in the present-day Kulai District and other parts of Malaya, but failed to establish Mao Zedong-style "liberated areas".

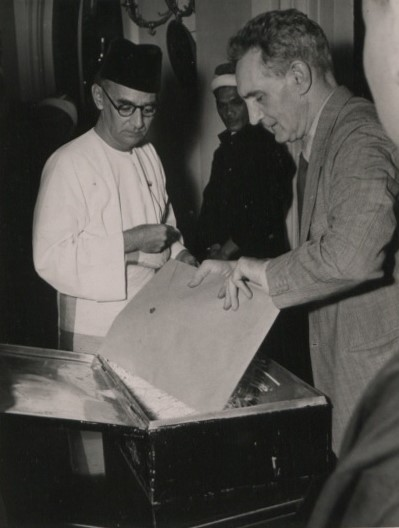
Onn Jaafar (left), the Menteri Besar of Johor and founder of the United Malays National Organisation (UMNO) with Dr. W. Linehan (right), C.M.G. Adviser on Constitutional Affairs during the Federation of Malaya Agreements in 1948

Fighting between the British occupation forces and their Malayan allies against the CPM continued through the formation of the Malayan Union on 1 April 1946 and the proclamation of the independence of the Federation of Malaya on 31 August 1957. At the time of independence there were three political factions: the Communists, the pro-British, and a race-based coalition. The pro-British side was divided between the Malayan Democratic Union, which was dominated by English-speaking Chinese and Eurasians who co-operate with left-wing Malay nationalists "for an independent Malaya that would also include Singapore" and another pro-British side comprising the Babas under the Straits Chinese British Association, who were trying to retain their status and privileges granted for their loyalty to the British during the Straits Settlements era by remaining under British administration. Meanwhile, the racial coalition, comprising the leading United Malays National Organisation (UMNO) in an alliance with the Malaysian Indian Congress and Malaysian Chinese Association, sought an independent Malaya based on a racial and religious privileges policy and won the 1955 Malayan general election, with the capital of Johor Bahru being the centre of the UMNO party.

=== Malaysia ===
In 1961, the Prime Minister of the Federation of Malaya Tunku Abdul Rahman desired to unite Malaya with the British colonies of North Borneo, Sarawak and Singapore. Despite growing opposition from the governments of Indonesia and the Philippines as well from Communist sympathisers and nationalists in Borneo, the federation was realised on 16 September 1963, with the sovereign state renamed Malaysia. The Indonesian government later launched a "policy of confrontation" towards the new federation, which prompted the United Kingdom and their allies of Australia and New Zealand to deploy armed forces. Pontian District became the coastal landing point for amphibious Indonesian troops during the confrontation while Labis and Tenang in Segamat District became the landing point for Indonesian para-commandos for subversion and sabotage attacks. Several encounters occurred in Kota Tinggi District, where nine Malayan/Singaporean troops and half of the Indonesian infiltrators were killed and the rest were captured. Despite several attacks that also cost civilian lives, the Indonesian side did not reach their main objective, and the confrontation ended in 1966 following the internal political struggle in Indonesia resulting from the 30 September Movement.

Since the end of the confrontation, the state's development has expanded further with industrial estates and new suburbs. Of the total approved development projects for Johor from 1980 until 1990, 69 per cent were concentrated in Johor Bahru and the Pasir Gudang area. Industrial estates and new suburbs were built in settlements on both the northern and eastern sides of the town, including Plentong and Tebrau. The town of Johor Bahru was officially recognised as a city on 1 January 1994. On 22 November 2017, Iskandar Puteri was declared a city and assigned as the administrative centre of the state, located in Kota Iskandar.

== Governance and politics ==
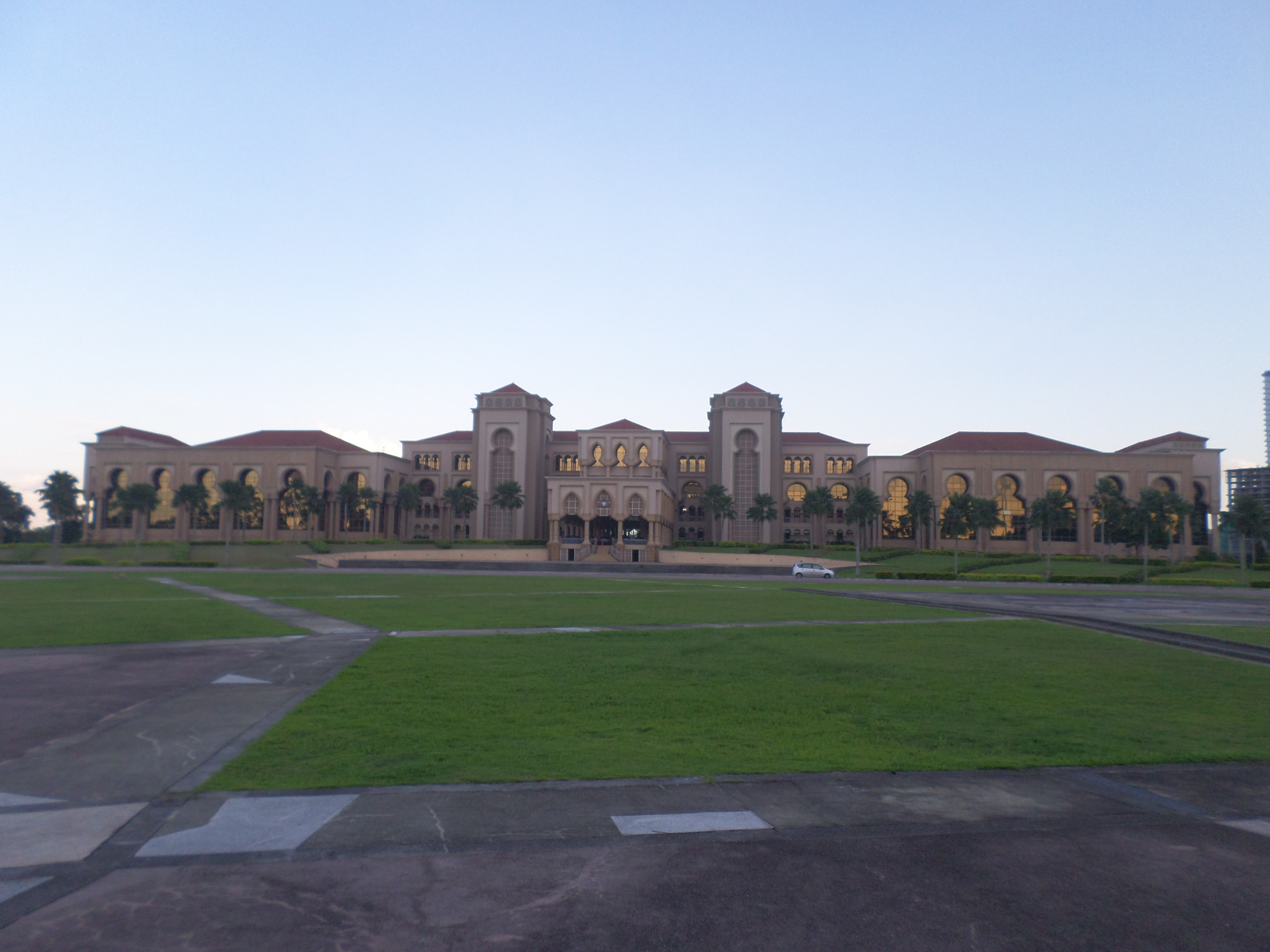
Dato' Jaafar Muhammad Building in Kota Iskandar, which houses the office of the Chief Minister of Johor

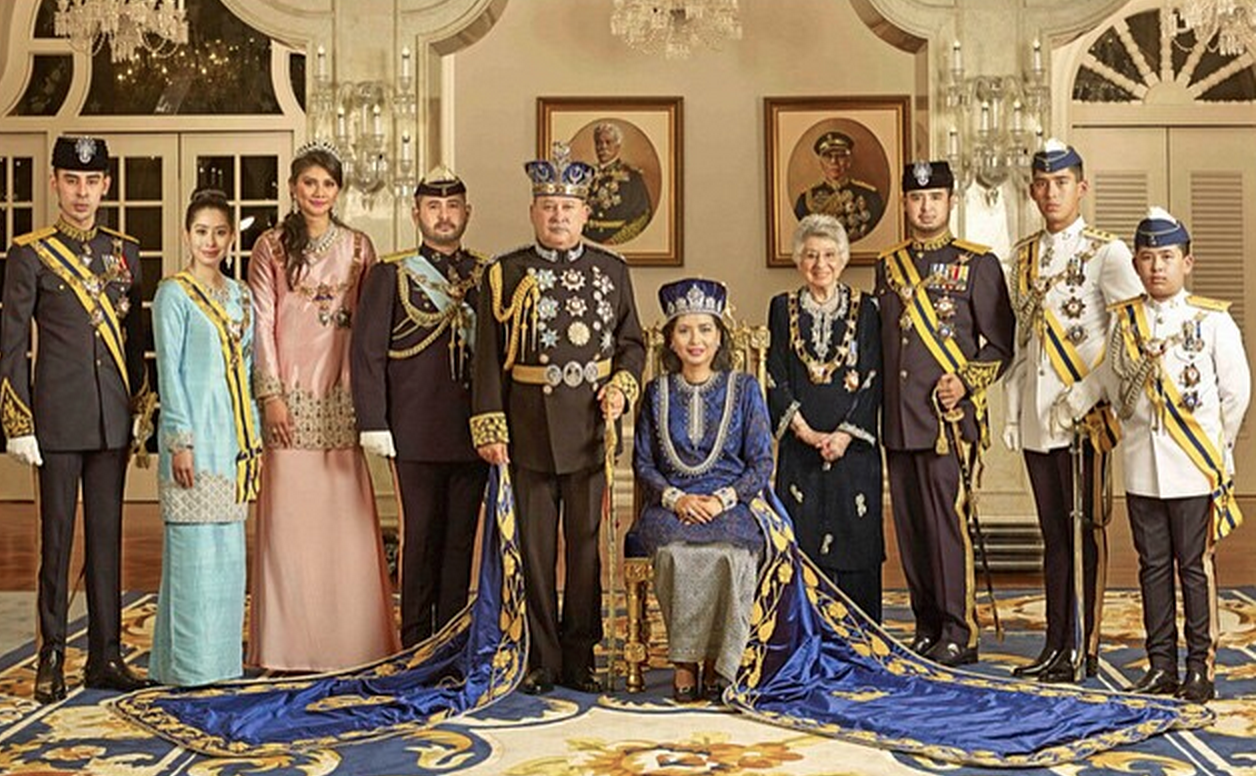
The Johor royal family in 2015

Johor is a constitutional monarchy and was the first state in Malaysia to adopt the system via the Laws of the Constitution of Johor 1895 (Malay: Undang-undang Tubuh Negeri Johor 1895) written by Sultan Abu Bakar in 1895. The constitutional head of Johor is the sultan. This hereditary position can only be held by a member of the Johor royal family who is descended from Abu Bakar. The current Sultan of Johor is Ibrahim Iskandar, who became sultan on 23 January 2010. The main royal palace for the sultan is the Bukit Serene Palace, while the crown prince's is the Istana Pasir Pelangi; both palaces are located in the state capital. Other palaces are the Grand Palace (which is also located in the state capital), Tanjong Palace in Muar, Sri Lambak in Kluang and Shooting Box in Segamat.

Johor was a sovereign state from 1948 until 1957 while the Federation of Malaya Agreement was in force, but its defence and external affairs were mainly under the control of the United Kingdom. The Malayan Federation was then merged with two British colonies in Borneo – North Borneo and Sarawak – to form the Federation of Malaysia. Since then, several disputes have arisen such as the incident involving the state royal family that resulted in the 1993 amendments to the Constitution of Malaysia, disputes with federal leaders on state and federation affairs, and dissatisfaction over slower development in contrast with the long-standing prosperity in neighbouring Singapore, which even led to statements about secession from Johor's royal family. Other social issues include the rise of racial and religious intolerance among the state's citizens since being part of the federation.

=== Executive ===
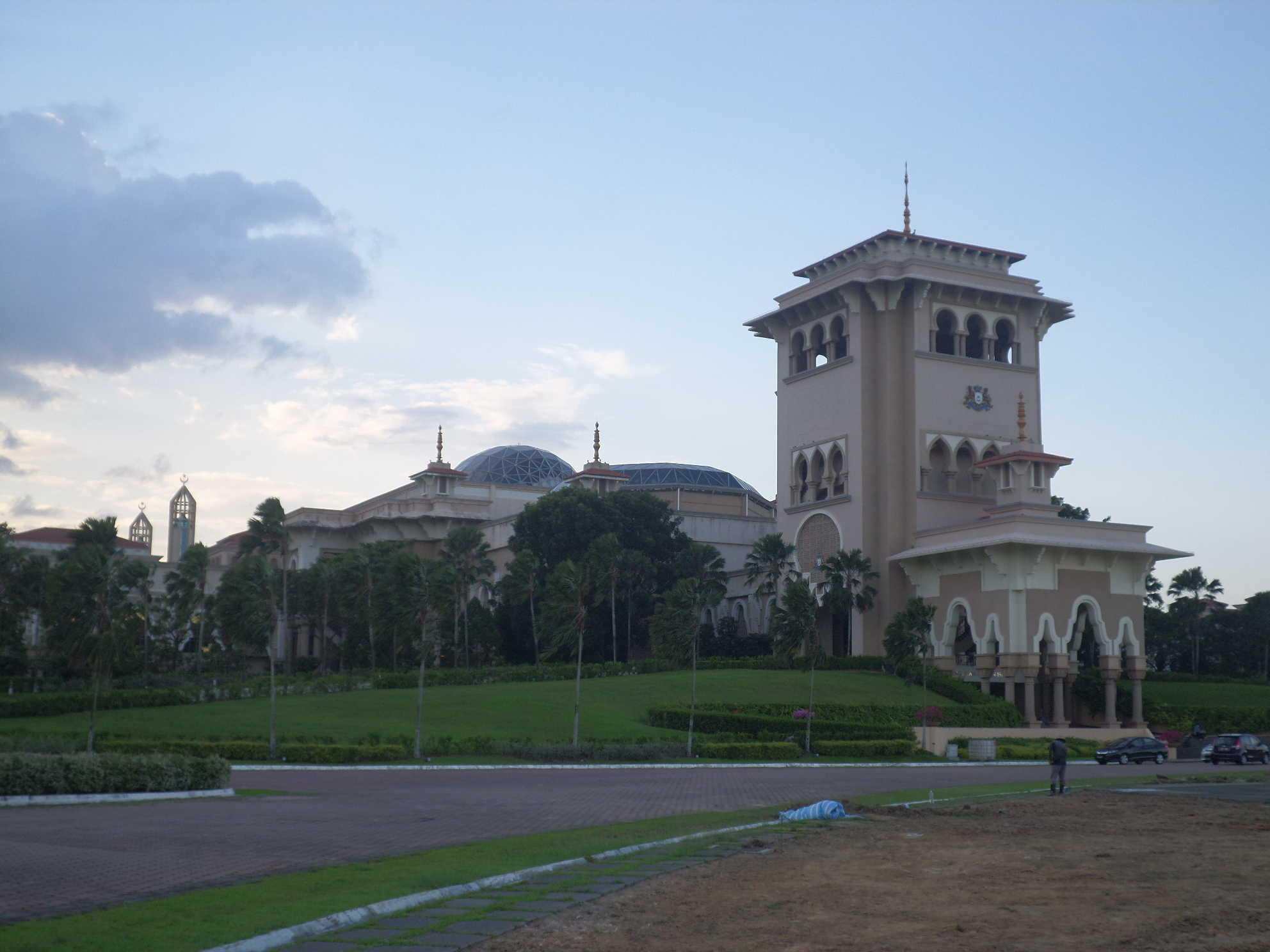
The Sultan Ismail Building houses the Johor State Legislative Assembly in Kota Iskandar, Iskandar Puteri.

The state government is headed by a Chief Minister, who is assisted by an 11-member executive council selected from the state assembly members.

=== Legislature ===
The legislative branch of Johor's government is the Johor State Legislative Assembly, which is based on the Westminster system. Therefore, the chief minister is appointed based on their ability to command the majority of the state assembly. The state assembly makes laws in matters regarding the state. Members of the Assembly are elected by citizens every five years by universal suffrage. There are 56 seats in the assembly. The majority (40 seats) are currently held by Barisan Nasional (BN).

| Affiliation | Coalition/Party Leader | Status | Seats | |
| Affiliation | Coalition/Party Leader | Status | 2026 election | Current |
|---|---|---|---|---|
| Barisan Nasional | Onn Hafiz Ghazi | Government | 48 | 48 |
| Pakatan Harapan | Andrew Chen Kah Eng | Opposition | 8 | 8 |
| Total | | | 56 | 56 |
| Government majority | | | 40 | 40 |

=== Administrative divisions ===
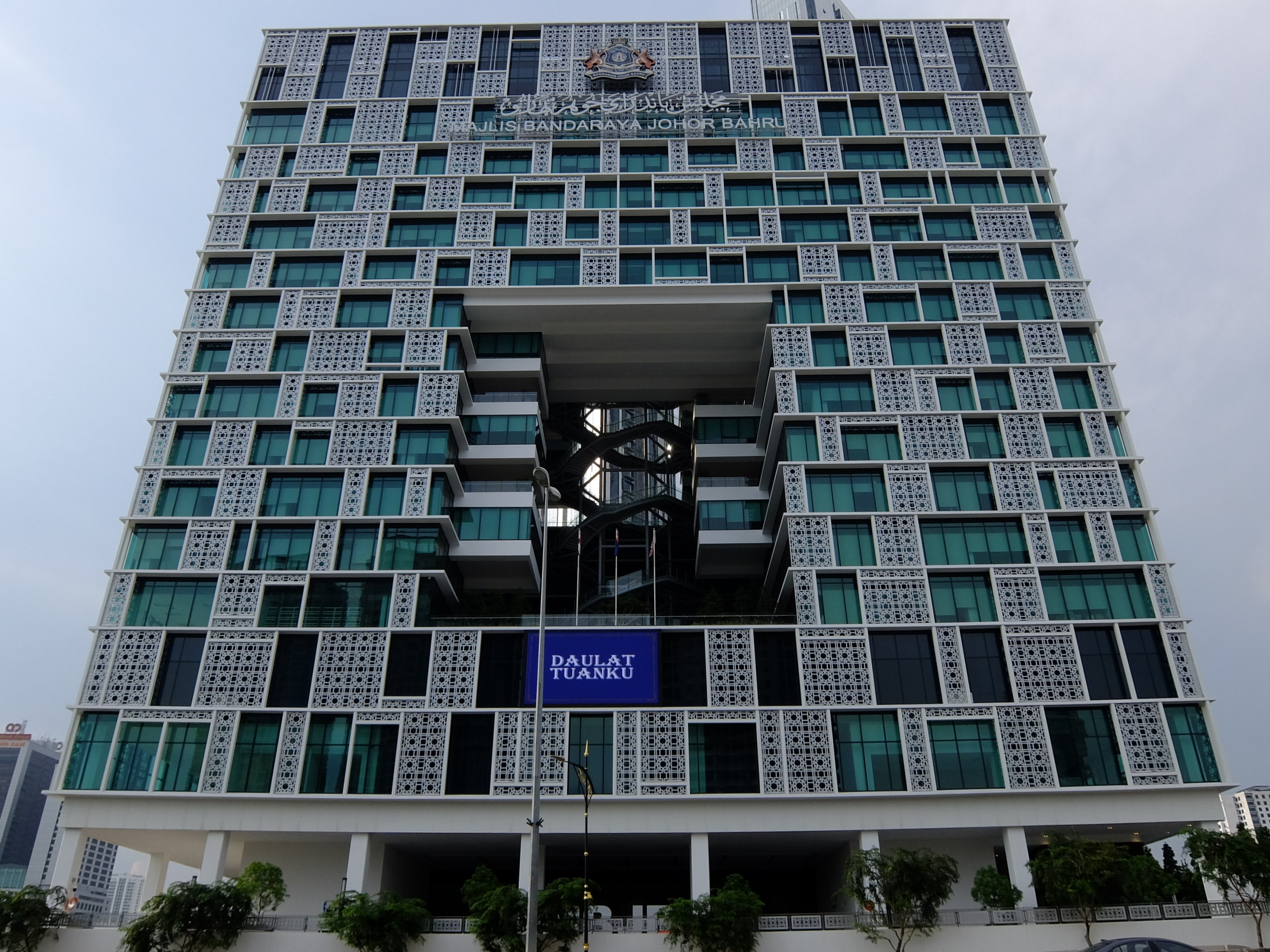
Johor Bahru City Council headquarters

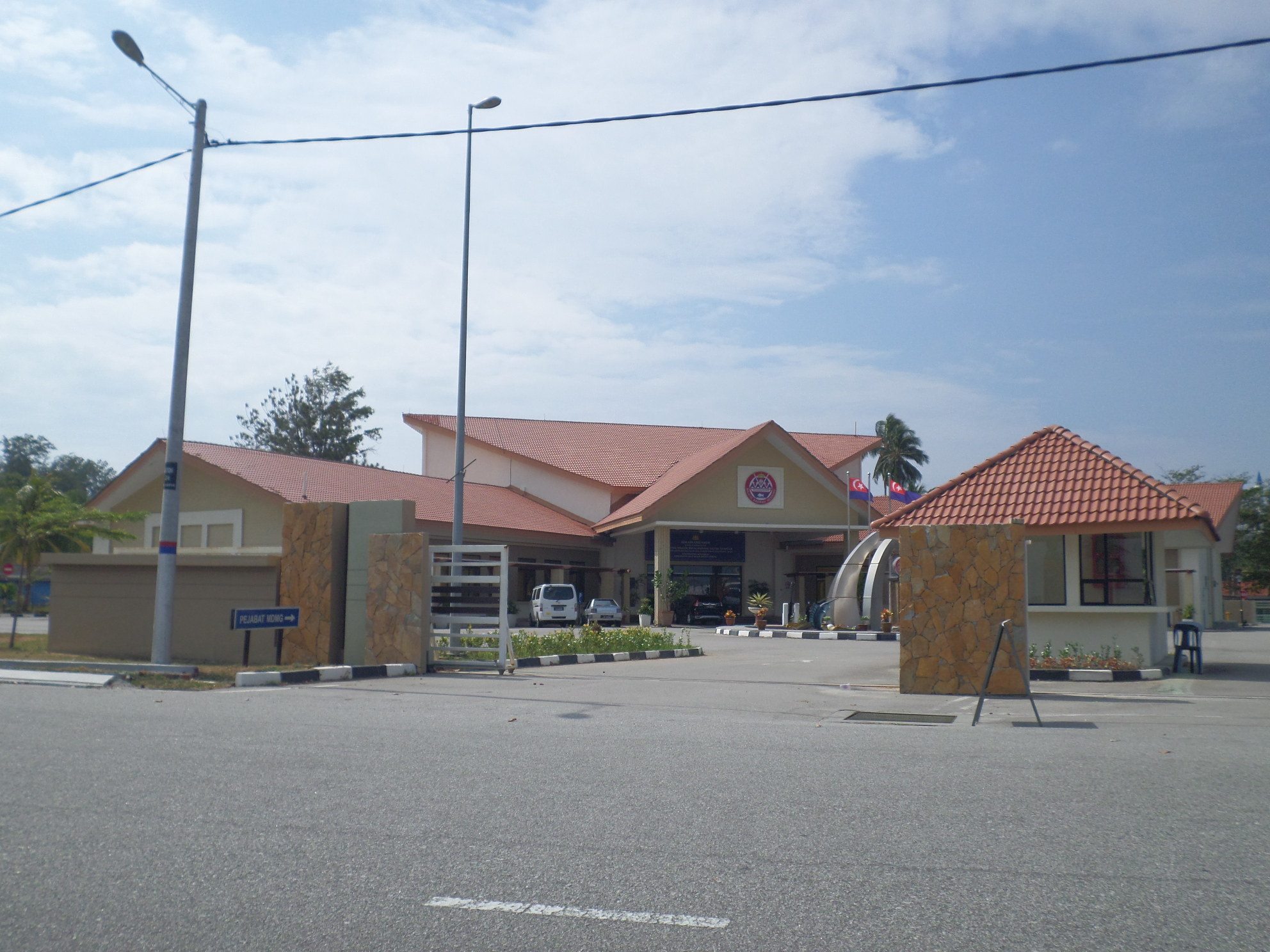
A district council office in Mersing District

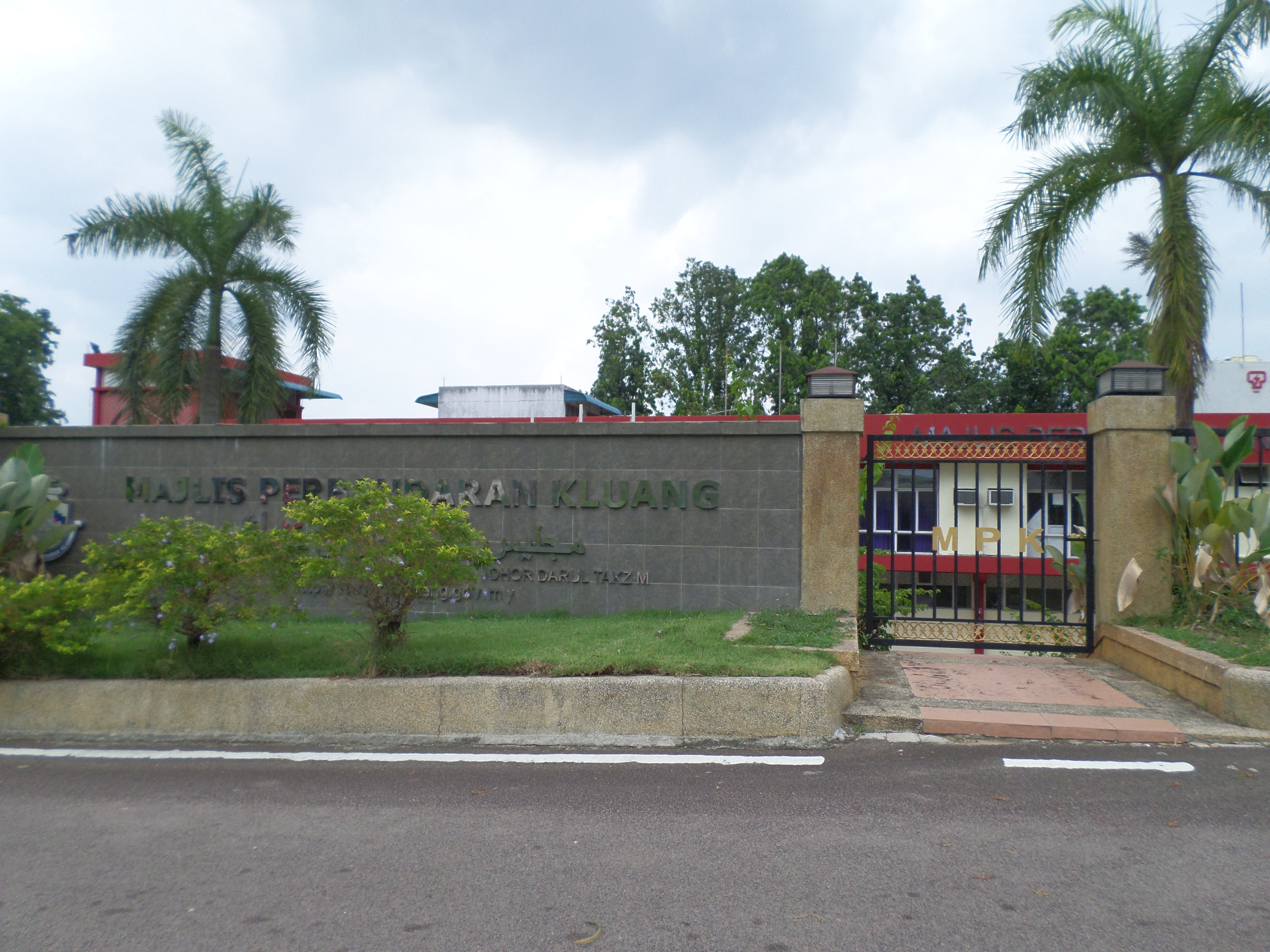
A municipal council office in Kluang District

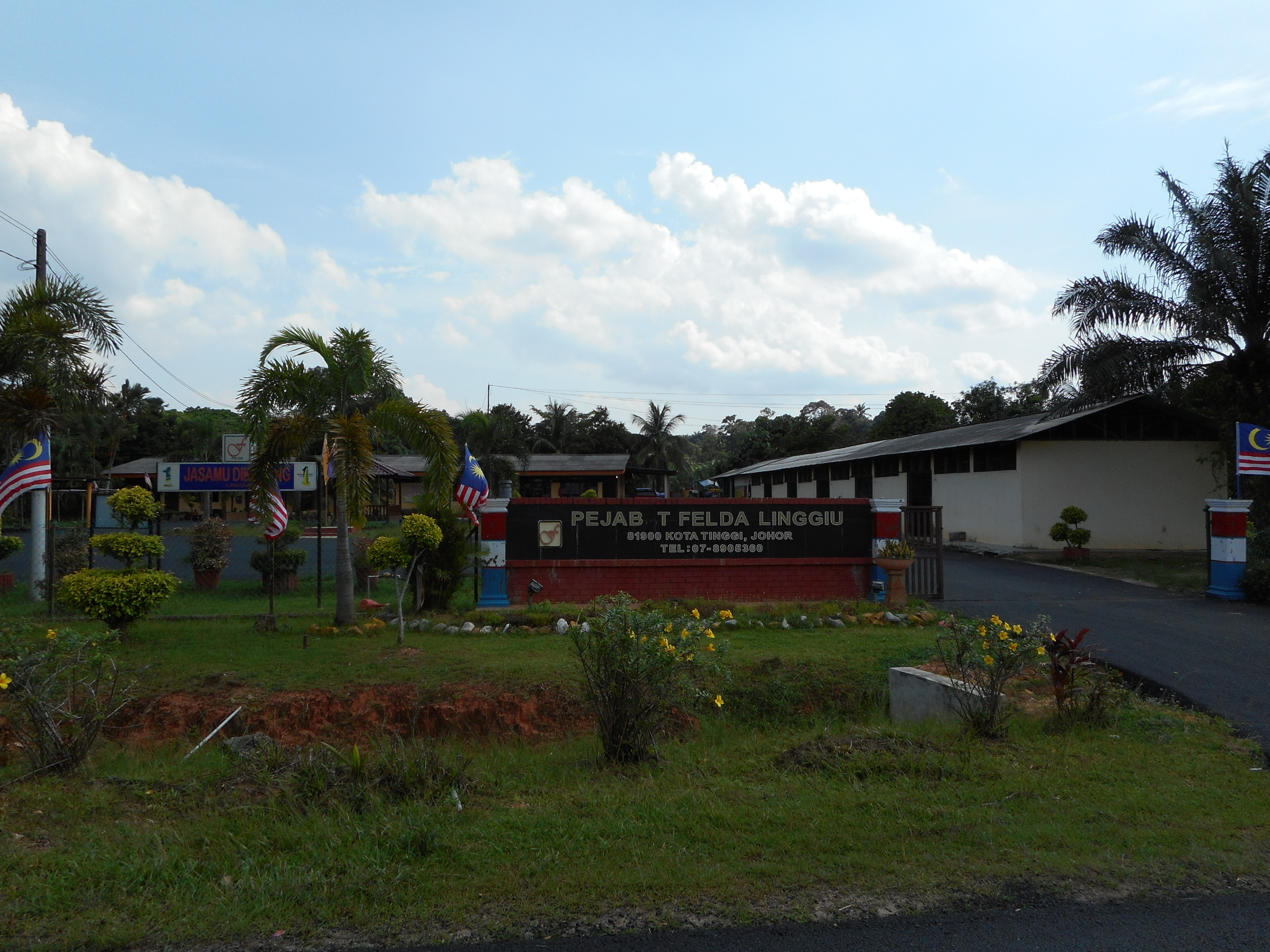
A FELDA office in Kota Tinggi District

Johor is divided into ten districts (daerah), 103 mukims and 16 local governments. There are district officers for each district and a village head person (known as a ketua kampung or penghulu) for each village in the district. Before the British arrival, Johor was run by a group of relatives and friends of the sultan. A more organised administration was developed in the treaty of friendship with Great Britain in 1885. A British Resident began to be accepted in 1914 when the state became part of the Unfederated Malay States (UMS). With the transformation into British-style administration, more Europeans were appointed into the administration with their role expanding from advising on financial matters to modern administration guidance. Malay state commissioners worked alongside British district officers, known in Johor as "Assistant Advisers". When the post of the Resident of the UMS was abolished, other European-held posts in the administration were replaced with locals. As in the rest of Malaysia, the local government comes under the purview of the state government.

| UPI Code | Districts | Capital | Area (km^{2}) | Population (2020) | Mukims |
|---|---|---|---|---|---|
| 0101 | Batu Pahat District | Batu Pahat | 1,878 | 495,338 | 14 |
| 0102 | Johor Bahru District | Johor Bahru | 1,817.8 | 1,711,191 | 6 |
| 0103 | Kluang District | Kluang | 2,851 | 323,762 | 8 |
| 0104 | Kota Tinggi District | Kota Tinggi | 3,488 | 222,382 | 10 |
| 0105 | Mersing District | Mersing | 2,838 | 78,195 | 14 |
| 0106 | Muar District | Muar | 1,376 | 314,776 | 12 |
| 0107 | Pontian District | Pontian Kechil | 907 | 173,318 | 11 |
| 0108 | Segamat District | Segamat | 2,851 | 197,762 | 11 |
| 0121 | Kulai District | Kulai | 753 | 329,497 | 4 |
| 0122 | Tangkak District | Tangkak | 970 | 163,449 | 6 |
| 01 | Total | Johor Bahru | 19,729.8 | 4,009,670 | 96 |

=== Security ===
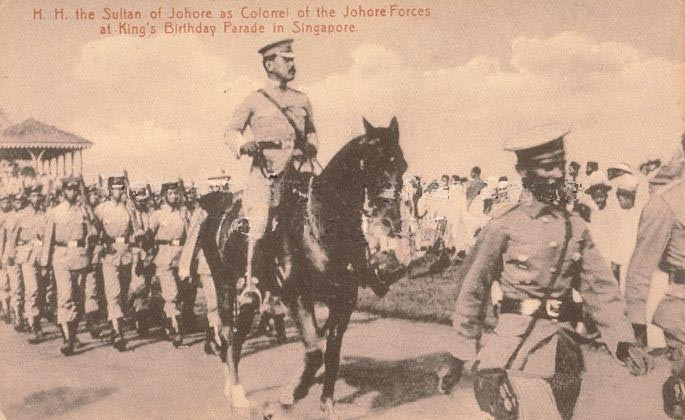
Sultan Ibrahim leading the Johor Military Forces (JMF) during the King's Birthday Parade of George V in Singapore, c. 1920

The Ninth Schedule of the Constitution of Malaysia states that the Malaysian federal government is solely responsible for foreign policy and military forces in the country. However, Johor has a private army, the only state to do so. The retention of the army was one of the stipulations Johor made in 1946 when it participated in the Federation of Malaya. This army, the Royal Johor Military Force (Askar Timbalan Setia Negeri Johor), has served as the protector of the Johor monarchs since 1886. It is one of the oldest military units in present-day Malaysia and had a significant historical role in the suppression of the 1915 Singapore Mutiny and served in both World Wars.

=== Territorial disputes ===
Map of the disputed island and rocks

Johor previously had a territorial dispute with Singapore. In 1979 Government of Malaysia published the Malaysian Territorial Waters and Continental Shelf Boundaries Map which showed the island of Batu Puteh (present-day Pedra Branca) as under their jurisdiction, Singapore lodged a formal protest the following year. The dispute originally concerned only the one feature, but when both sides agreed to refer the matter to the International Court of Justice (ICJ) in 2003, the dispute was enlarged to include two other features in the vicinity, Middle Rocks and South Ledge. In 2008 the ICJ decided that "Batu Puteh belongs to Singapore, Middle Rocks to Malaysia and South Ledge belongs to the state in the territorial waters of which it is located". The final decision by ICJ to award Pedra Branca to Singapore was in line with the 1953 letter made by the Acting State Secretary of Johor in response to the question letter regarding Pedra Branca from the Colonial Secretary of Singapore, where the Government of Johor openly stated that it did not claim ownership of Pedra Branca despite acknowledging that the old Johor Empire once ruled most of the islands in the area. In 2017, Malaysia appealed the case of Pedra Branca based on the conditions required by the ICJ that a case could be revised within six months of discovery of facts and within ten years of the date of judgement following the discovery of several facts. The request was dropped following internal changes in the new Malaysian administration the following year where they subsequently acknowledged Singapore's permanent sovereignty over the island while announcing plans to convert the Middle Rocks into an island.

== Geography ==
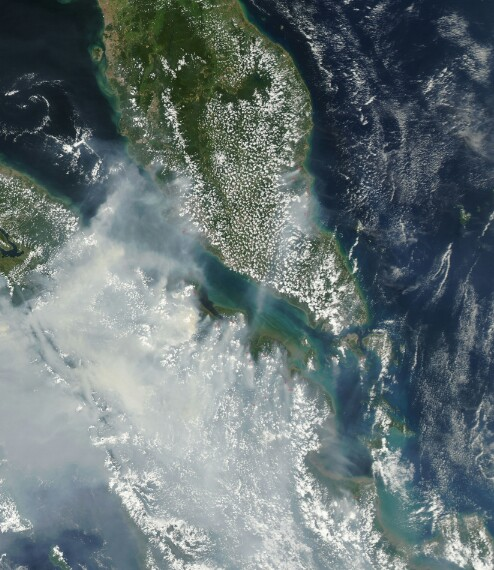
Johor is located in southern Malay Peninsula as seen from NASA satellite image.

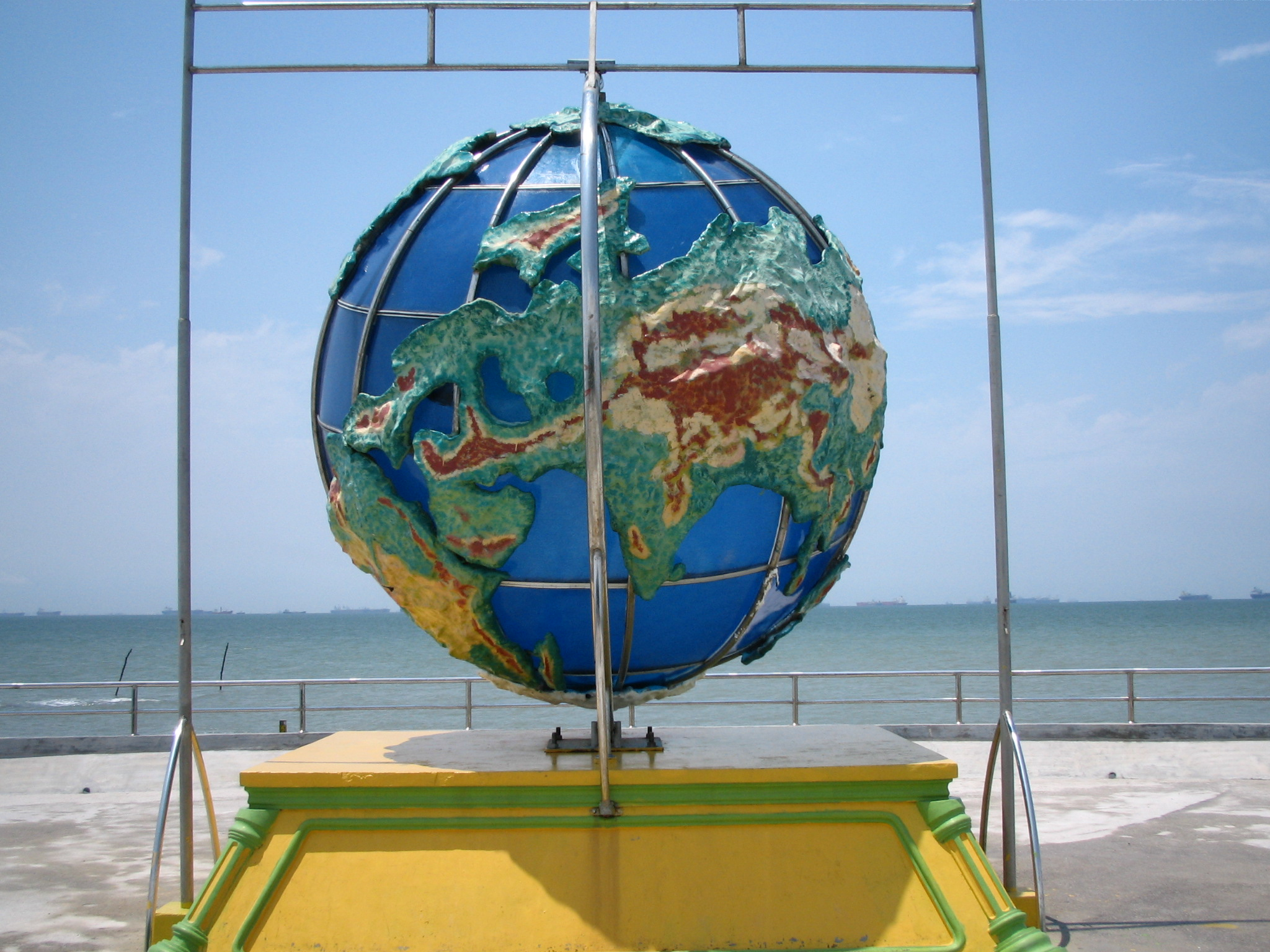
The southernmost tip of mainland Eurasia, at Tanjung Piai

The total land area of Johor is nearly 19,166 square kilometres (7,400 sq mi), and it is surrounded by the South China Sea to the east, the Straits of Johor to the south and the Straits of Malacca to the west. The southernmost point of mainland Eurasia, is located at Tanjung Piai. The state has 400 kilometres (250 mi) of coastline, of which 237.7 kilometres (147.7 mi) have been eroding. A majority of its coastline, especially on the west coast is covered with mangrove and nipah forests. The east coast is dominated by sand beaches and rocky headlands, while the south coast consists of a series of alternating headlands and bays. Its exclusive economic zone extends much further in the South China Sea than in the Straits of Malacca.

The western part of Johor had a considerable amount of peatland. In 2005, the state recorded 391,499,002 hectares (967,415,102 acres) of forested land, which is classified into natural inland forest, peat swamp forest, mangrove forest and mud flat. About 83% of Johor's terrain is lowlands, while only 17% is higher and steep terrain. While being relatively flat, Johor is dotted with many isolated peaks known as inselbergs, including isolated massifs. Mount Ledang, also known as Mount Ophir, in the district of Tangkak and near the tripoint with Malacca and Negeri Sembilan, is the state's highest point at 1,276 metres above sea level. Also in the state are Mount Besar, Mount Belumut and Mount Panti, which form the southern foothills of the Tenasserim Hills that extends from southern Myanmar and Thailand. Since the state also lies on the Sunda Plate, it experiences tremors from nearby earthquakes in Sumatra, Indonesia.

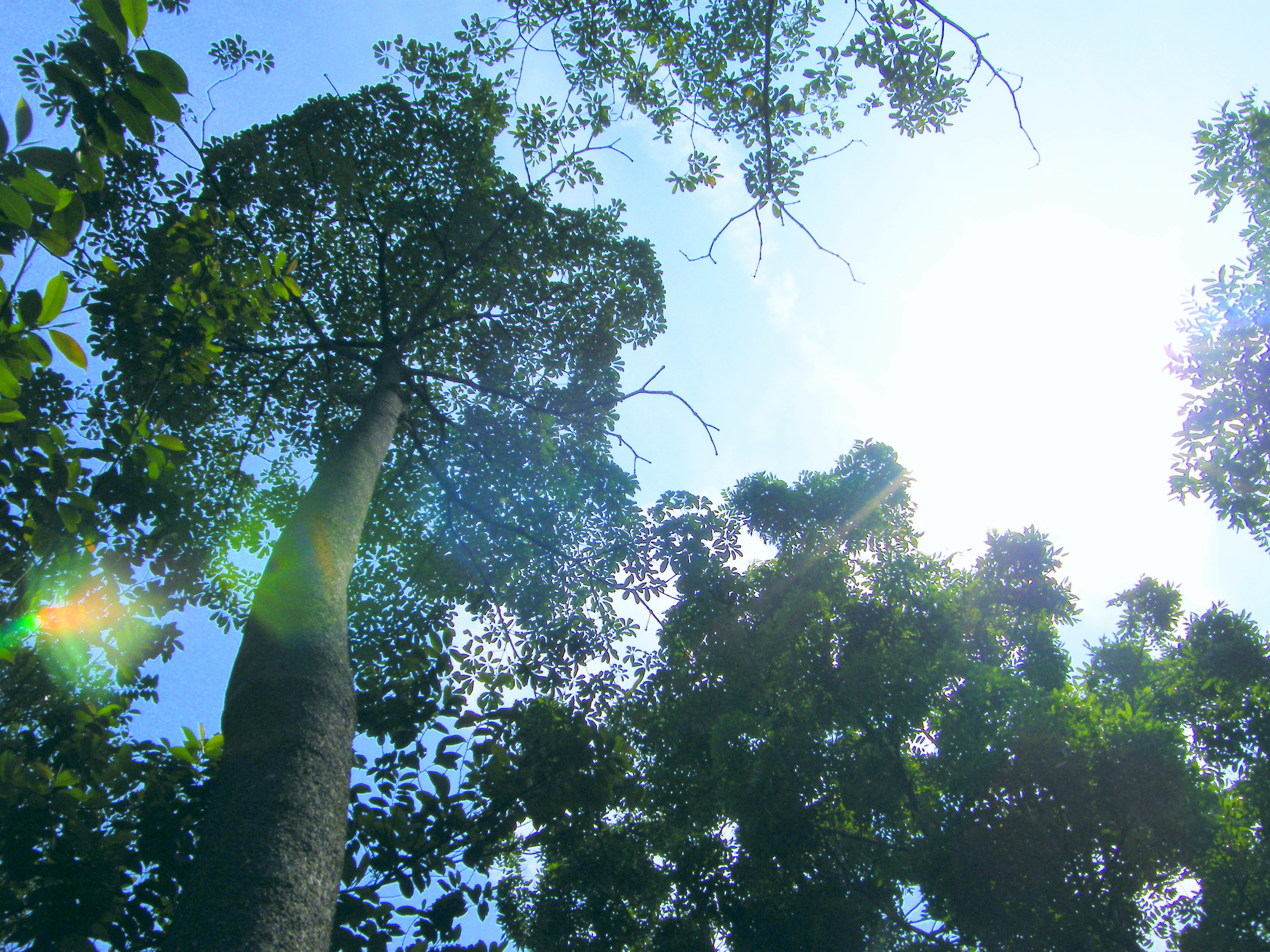
Forest trees of Johor in tropical rainforest climate

Much of central Johor is covered with dense forest, where an extensive network of rivers originating from mountains and hills in the area spreads to the west, east and south. On the west coast, the Batu Pahat River, Muar River and Pontian River flow to the Straits of Malacca, while the Johor River, Perepat River, Pulai River, Skudai River and Tebrau River flow to the Straits of Johor in the south. The Endau River, Mersing River, Sedili Besar River and Sedili Kecil River flow to the South China Sea in the east. The Johor River Basin covers an area of 2,690 kilometres, starting from Mount Belumut (east of Kluang) and Mount Gemuruh (to the north) downstream to Tanjung Belungkor. The river originates from the Layang-Layang, Linggiu, and Sayong rivers before converging into the main river and flowing southeast to the Straits of Johor for 122.7 kilometres (76.2 miles). Its tributaries include the Berangan River, Lebak River, Lebam River, Panti River, Pengeli River, Permandi River, Seluyut River, Semangar River, Telor River, Tembioh River, and Tiram River. Other river basins in Johor including the Ayer Baloi River, Benut River, Botak Drainage, Jemaluang River, Pontian Besar River, Sanglang River, Santi River, and Sarang Buaya River.

=== Climate ===
Johor is located in a tropical region with an equatorial climate. Both the temperature and humidity are consistently high throughout the year with heavy rainfall. Average monthly temperatures between 26 °C (79 °F) and 28 °C (82 °F), with the lowest recorded during the rainy seasons. The west coast receives an average of between 2,000 millimetres and 2,500 millimetres of rain, while in the east the average rainfall is higher, with Endau and Pengerang receiving more than 3,400 millimetres of rain a year. The state experiences two monsoon seasons, the northeast and southwest seasons; the northeast occurs from November until March while the southeast occurs from May until September, and the transitional months for the monsoon seasons are April and November. The state experienced extreme flooding from December 2006 to January 2007 with around 60,000–70,000 of the state residents evacuated to an emergency shelter.

Climate data for Johor Bahru (Senai International Airport) (2006–2020 normals, extremes 2015–present)
| Month | Jan | Feb | Mar | Apr | May | Jun | Jul | Aug | Sep | Oct | Nov | Dec | Year |
|---|---|---|---|---|---|---|---|---|---|---|---|---|---|
| Record high °C (°F) | 36.7 (98.1) | 36.6 (97.9) | 37.0 (98.6) | 37.3 (99.1) | 36.2 (97.2) | 36.9 (98.4) | 36.6 (97.9) | 36.2 (97.2) | 36.9 (98.4) | 35.5 (95.9) | 35.1 (95.2) | 35.3 (95.5) | 37.3 (99.1) |
| Mean daily maximum °C (°F) | 30.8 (87.4) | 31.4 (88.5) | 32.2 (90.0) | 32.4 (90.3) | 32.0 (89.6) | 31.6 (88.9) | 31.2 (88.2) | 31.3 (88.3) | 31.6 (88.9) | 31.8 (89.2) | 31.2 (88.2) | 30.8 (87.4) | 31.5 (88.7) |
| Daily mean °C (°F) | 27.1 (80.8) | 27.3 (81.1) | 27.9 (82.2) | 28.3 (82.9) | 28.2 (82.8) | 27.9 (82.2) | 27.6 (81.7) | 27.5 (81.5) | 27.6 (81.7) | 27.8 (82.0) | 27.6 (81.7) | 27.3 (81.1) | 27.7 (81.8) |
| Mean daily minimum °C (°F) | 23.3 (73.9) | 23.3 (73.9) | 23.7 (74.7) | 24.1 (75.4) | 24.3 (75.7) | 24.3 (75.7) | 24.0 (75.2) | 23.7 (74.7) | 23.6 (74.5) | 23.8 (74.8) | 24.0 (75.2) | 23.9 (75.0) | 23.8 (74.9) |
| Record low °C (°F) | 21.7 (71.1) | 21.6 (70.9) | 22.3 (72.1) | 22.2 (72.0) | 21.9 (71.4) | 22.0 (71.6) | 21.9 (71.4) | 21.2 (70.2) | 21.6 (70.9) | 22.4 (72.3) | 22.3 (72.1) | 22.2 (72.0) | 21.2 (70.2) |
| Average precipitation mm (inches) | 162.6 (6.40) | 139.8 (5.50) | 203.4 (8.01) | 232.8 (9.17) | 215.3 (8.48) | 148.1 (5.83) | 177.0 (6.97) | 185.9 (7.32) | 190.8 (7.51) | 217.7 (8.57) | 237.6 (9.35) | 244.5 (9.63) | 2,355.5 (92.74) |
| Average precipitation days (≥ 1.0 mm) | 11 | 9 | 13 | 15 | 15 | 12 | 13 | 13 | 13 | 16 | 17 | 15 | 162 |
Source 1: IEM
Source 2: World Meteorological Organisation (precipitation 1974–2000)Meteomanz (extremes)

Landscapes of Johor

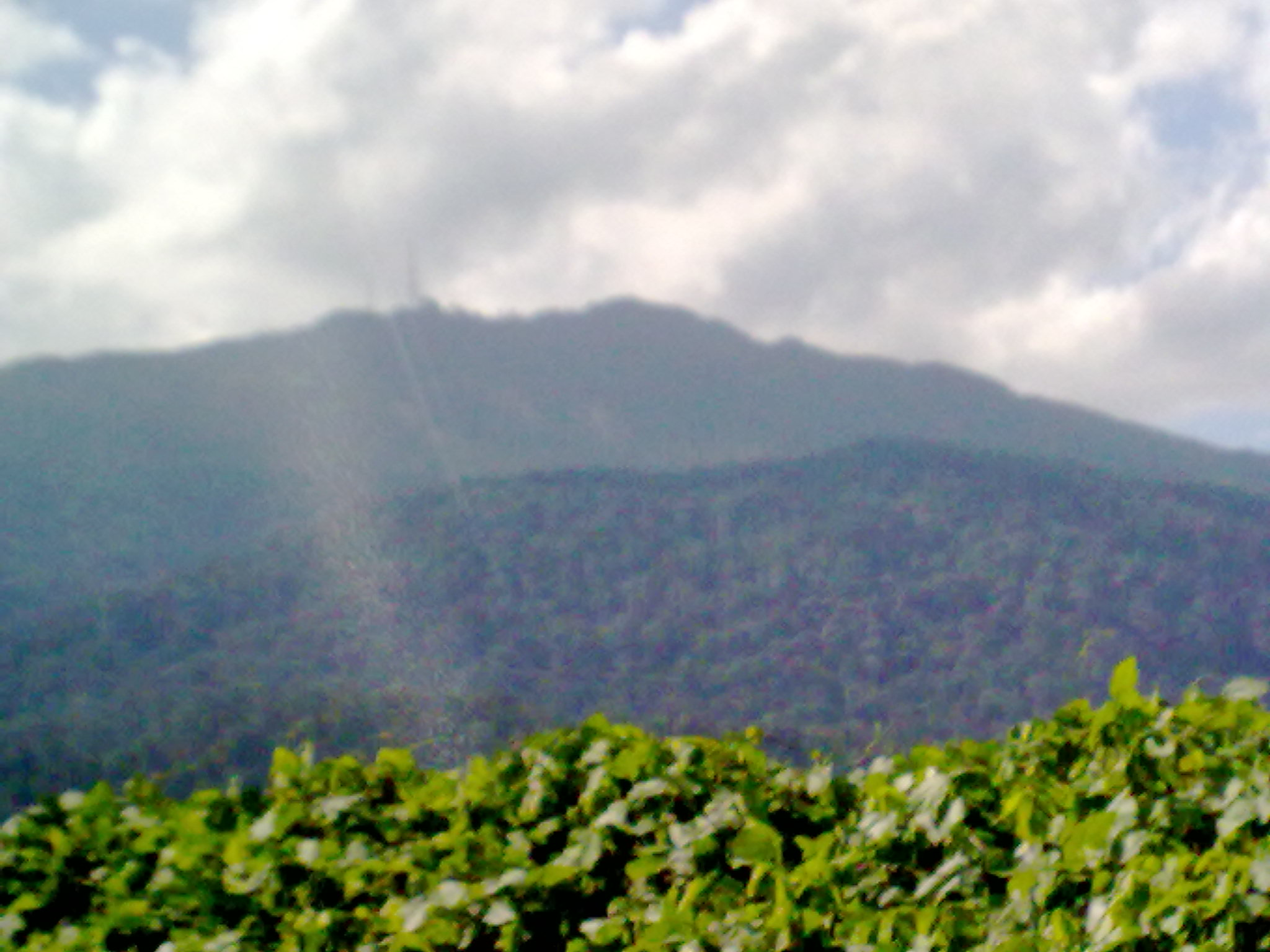
Mount Ophir

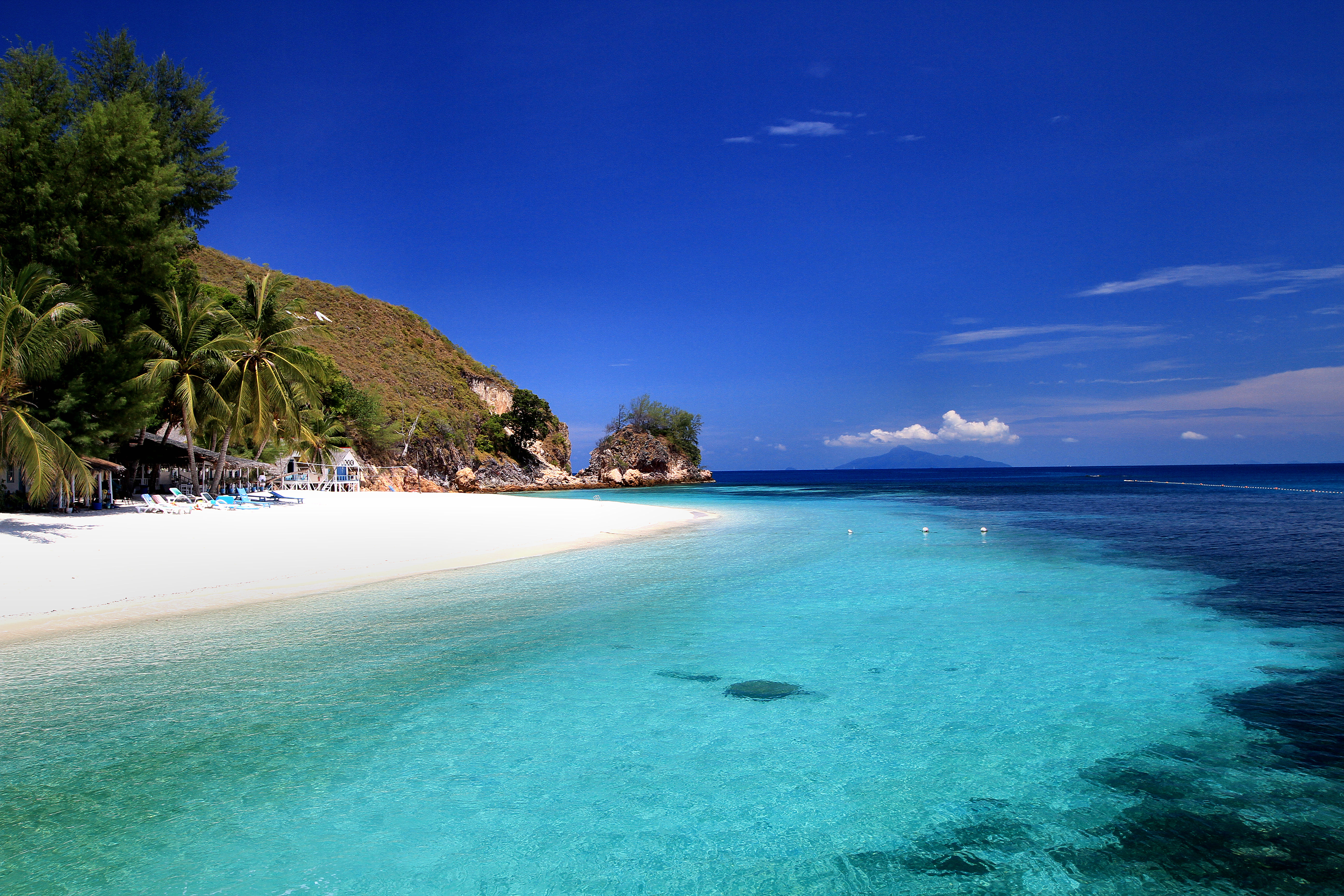
Rawa Island beach

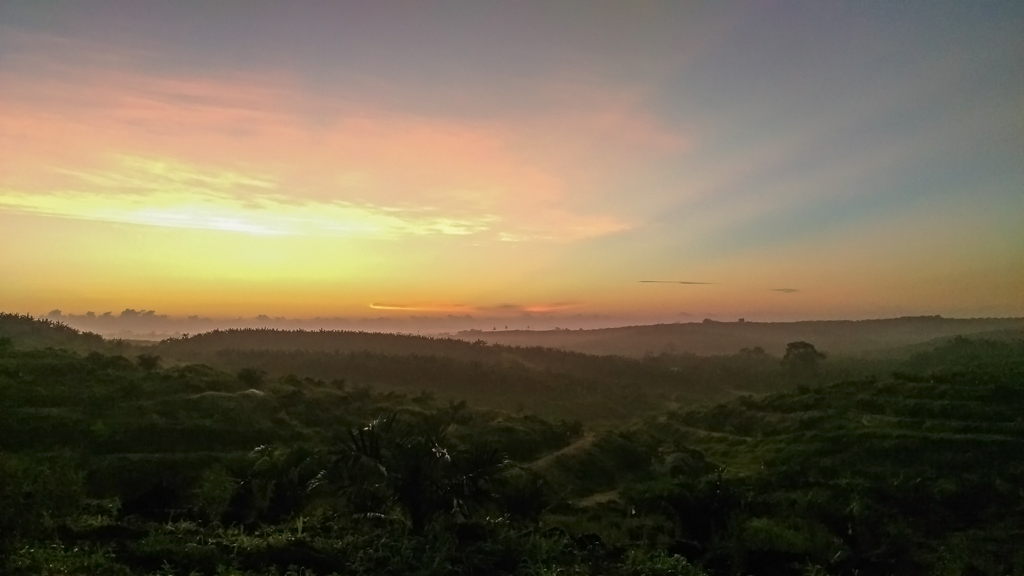
Sunrise over a palm oil plantation

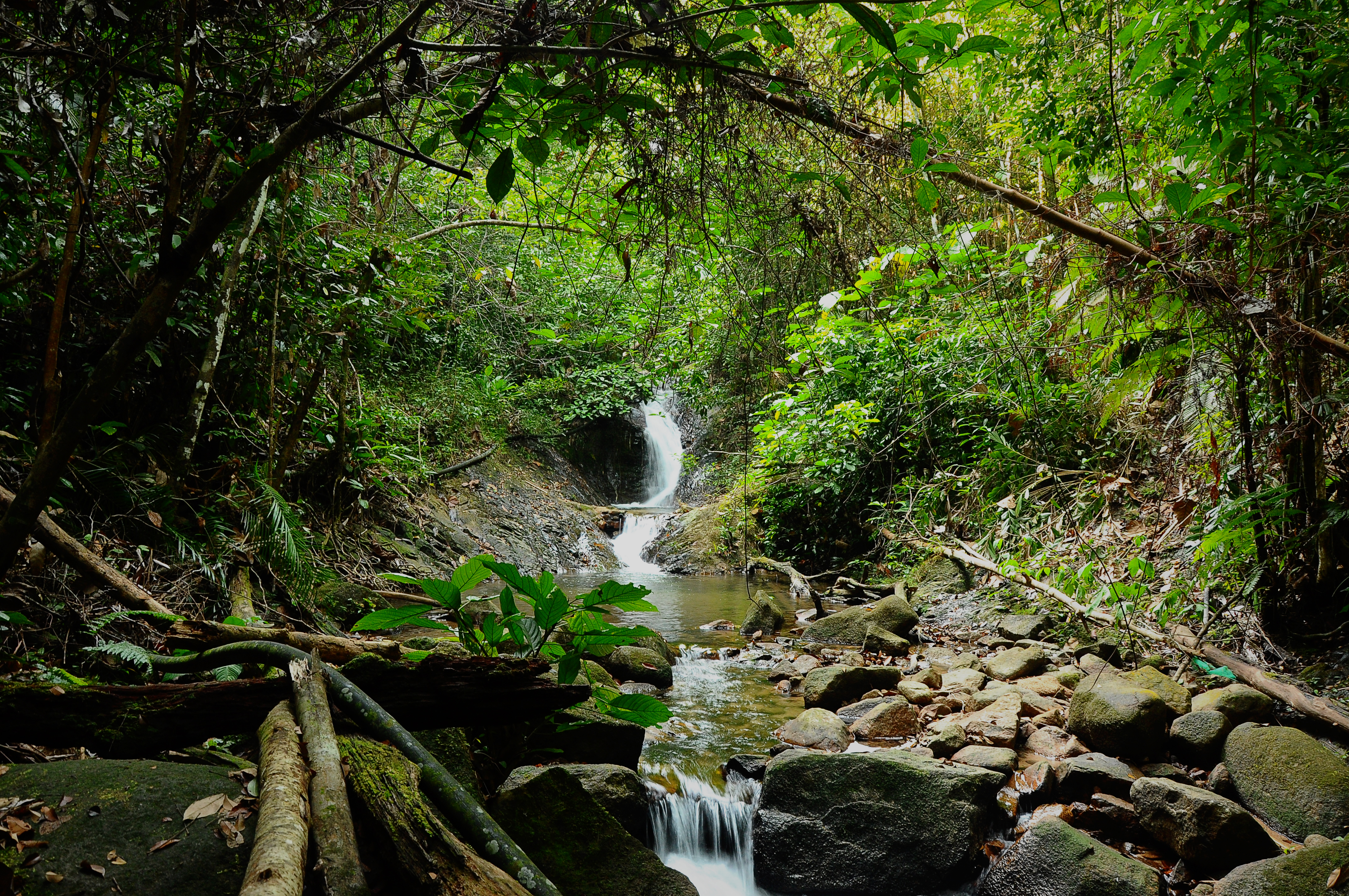
Waterfall in Mount Belumut
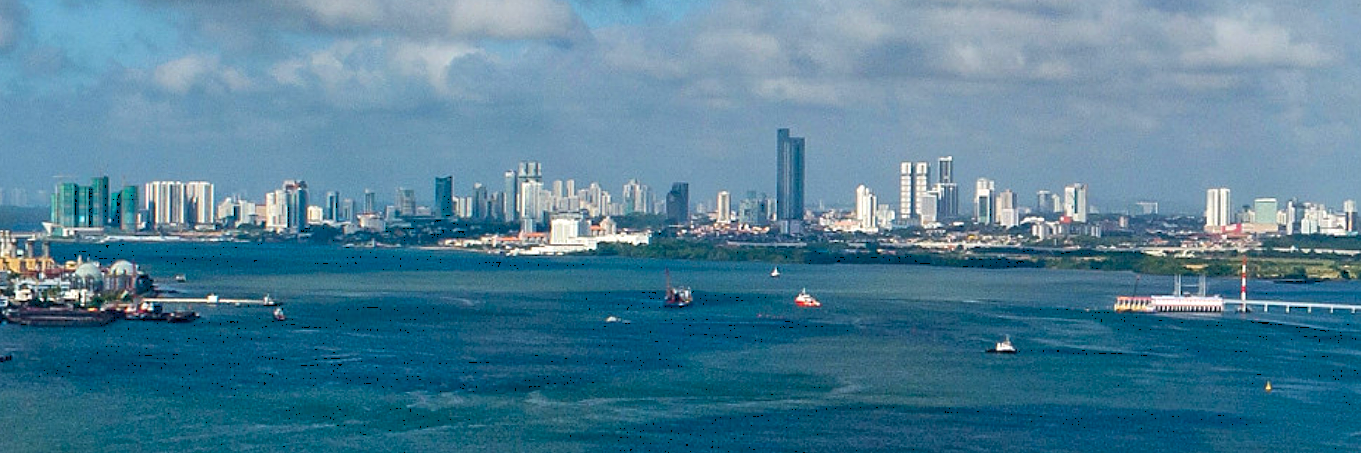
City centre skyline of Johor Bahru, as of 2023

=== Biodiversity ===
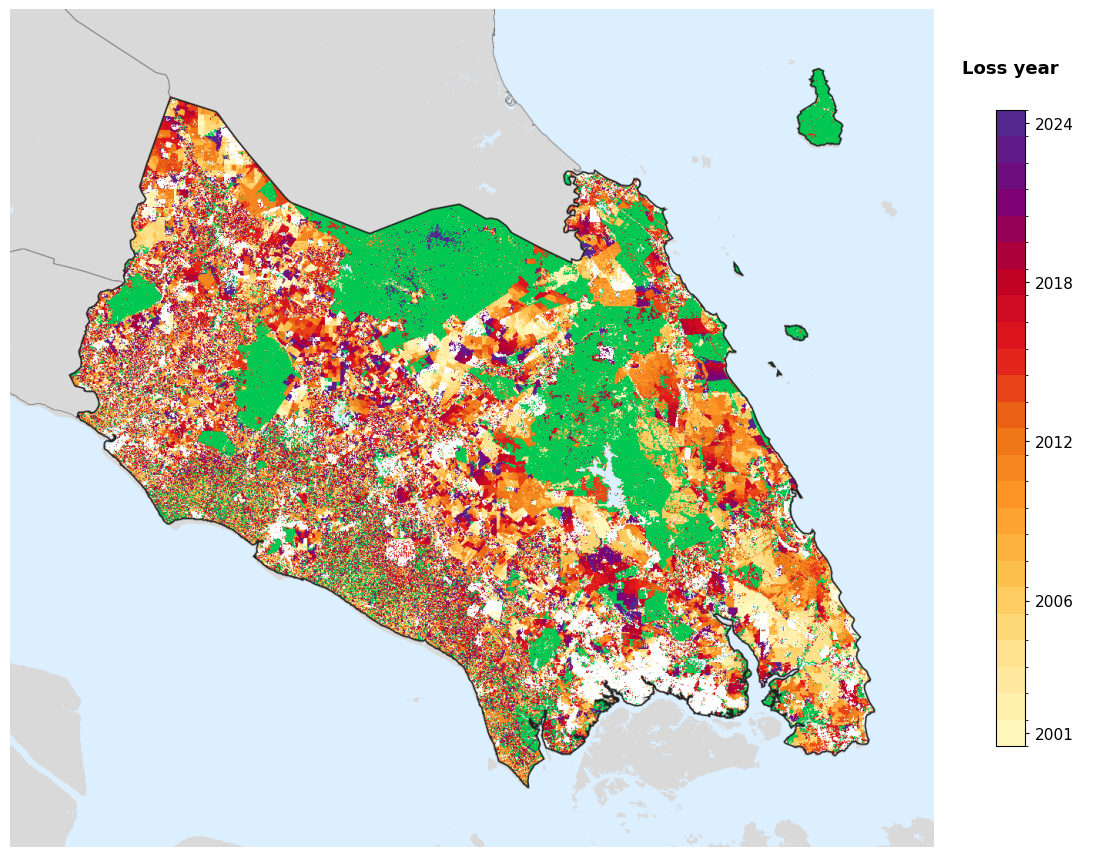
Tree-cover loss year in Johor, 2001-2024, from the Global Forest Change dataset

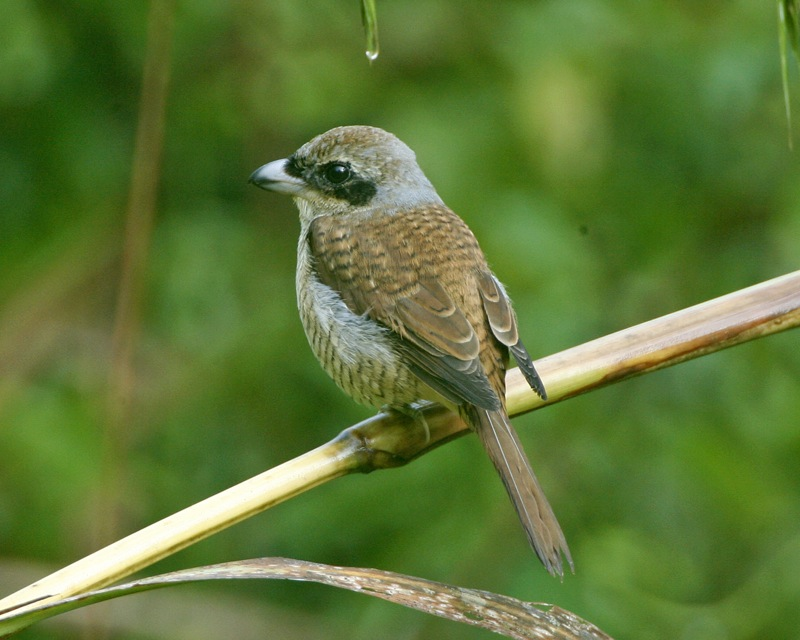
A female tiger shrike (Lanius tigrinus) in Panti Forest

The jungles of Johor host a diverse array of plant and animal species, with an estimated 950 vertebrates species, comprising 200 mammals, 600 birds and 150 reptiles, along with 2,080 invertebrate species. The Endau-Rompin National Park is the largest national park in the state, covering an area of 48,905 hectares (120,847 acres) in northern Johor; its name comes from the Endau and Rompin rivers that flow through the park. There are two entry points for the park, one through Peta with an area of 19,562 hectares (48,339 acres) (about 40% of the total area) with entrance from Kahang in the Mersing District and the other at Kampung Selai with an area of 29,343 hectares (72,508 acres) (about 60% of the total area) with entrance from Bekok in Segamat District. Destinations in Peta including the Buaya Sangkut Waterfalls, Upeh Guling Waterfalls, Air Biru Lake, Janing Barat, Nature Education and Research Centre (NERC), Kuala Jasin and Peta indigenous village, while in Selai the area is mostly for hiking and jungle trekking. Some mammal species found in the park include the Asian elephant, clouded leopard, Malayan sun bear, Malayan tapir and Malayan tiger.

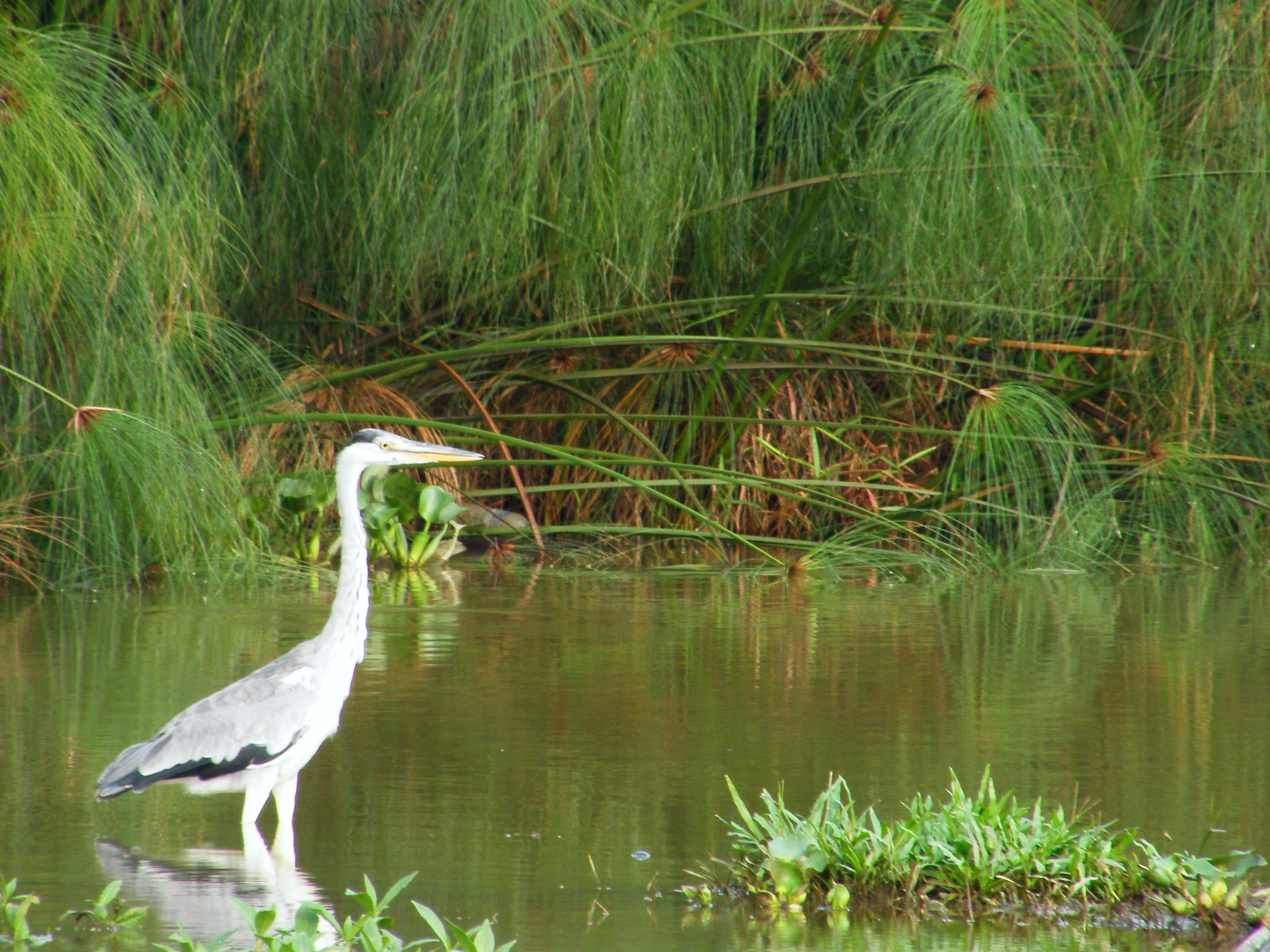
Heron in a swamp of Johor

Gunung Ledang National Park in western Johor, was established in 2005 with an area of 8,611 hectares (21,278 acres). It has various rivers and streams, waterfalls, diverse rainforest, pines, and sub-montane forest, and the Tangkak Dam can also be seen from the park area. Several trails for hiking are available, such as the Asahan Trail, Ayer Panas Trail, Jementah Trail and Lagenda Trail. The state's only marine park, the Sultan Iskandar Park, is located off the east coast and is made up of 13 islands in six clusters, Aur, Besar, Pemanggil, Rawa, Sibu and Tinggi, with an area of more than 8,000 hectares (19,768 acres). In 2003, three wetlands in southern Johor comprising Kukup Island, Pulai River and Tanjung Piai were designated as a Ramsar site. Tanjung Piai covers an area of 526 hectares (1,300 acres) of mangroves and another 400 hectares (988 acres) of inter-tidal mudflats, Pulai River with 9,126.0 hectares (22,551 acres) and Kukup Island with 647 hectares (1,599 acres) surrounded by some 800 hectares (1,977 acres) of mudflats. The Pulai River became a seahorse sanctuary and hatchery as part of the state biodiversity masterplan, since Johor's waters are home to three of the eight seahorse species found in Malaysia.

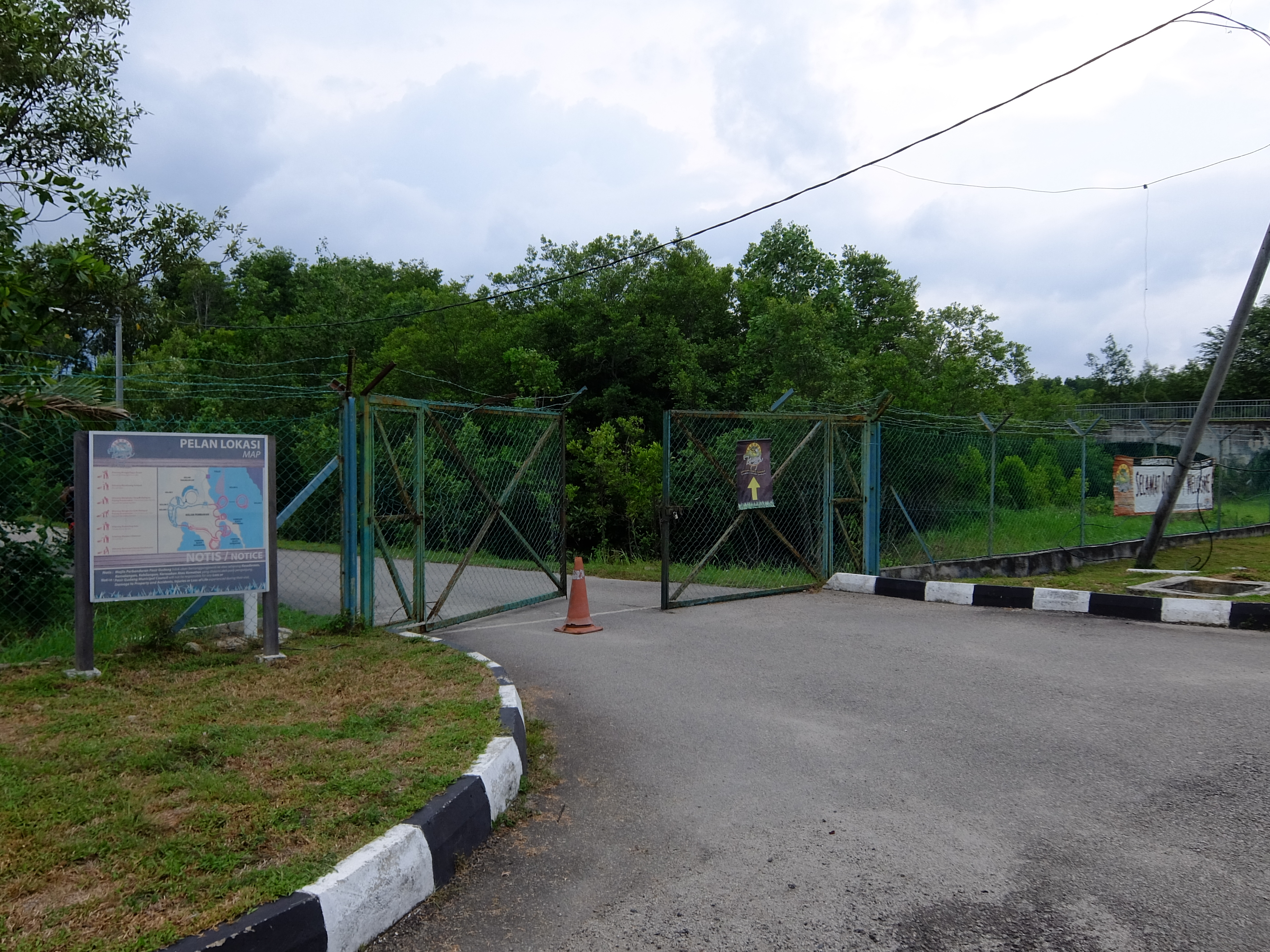
Crocodile sanctuary in Pasir Gudang

Poaching is a concern, with the number of wild animals in state parks decreasing with the rise of hunting and fishing in the 2000s. In 2004, local authorities uncovered large-scale sandalwood (gaharu) poaching by foreigners in the Endau-Rompin National Park with a large number of protected plant species being confiscated from the suspects. The conversion of mangrove areas along the southern and eastern coasts for use in aquaculture projects, sand mining and rapid urbanisation in addition to the abnormal weather patterns caused by climate change and rising sea levels are contributing to the erosion of the state's coastline. It has also been discovered that some 68,468 hectares (169,188 acres) of peatland soils in western Johor have been planted with palm oil plantations. In 2017, around 28 rivers in the state were categorised as polluted, leading the authorities and government to push for legislative change and sterner action against river polluters, especially since severe pollution has disrupted the water supply to an estimated 1.8 million people in the state. The 2019 Kim Kim River toxic pollution affected 6,000 residents of the industrial area of Pasir Gudang with 2,775 being hospitalised. Forest fires have also become a concern with more than 380 recorded throughout the state in 2016.

== Economy ==
Johor GDP Share by Sector (2016)
1. Services (47.1%)
2. Manufacturing (30.6%)
3. Agriculture (13.5%)
4. Construction (6.80%)
5. Import Duties (1.90%)

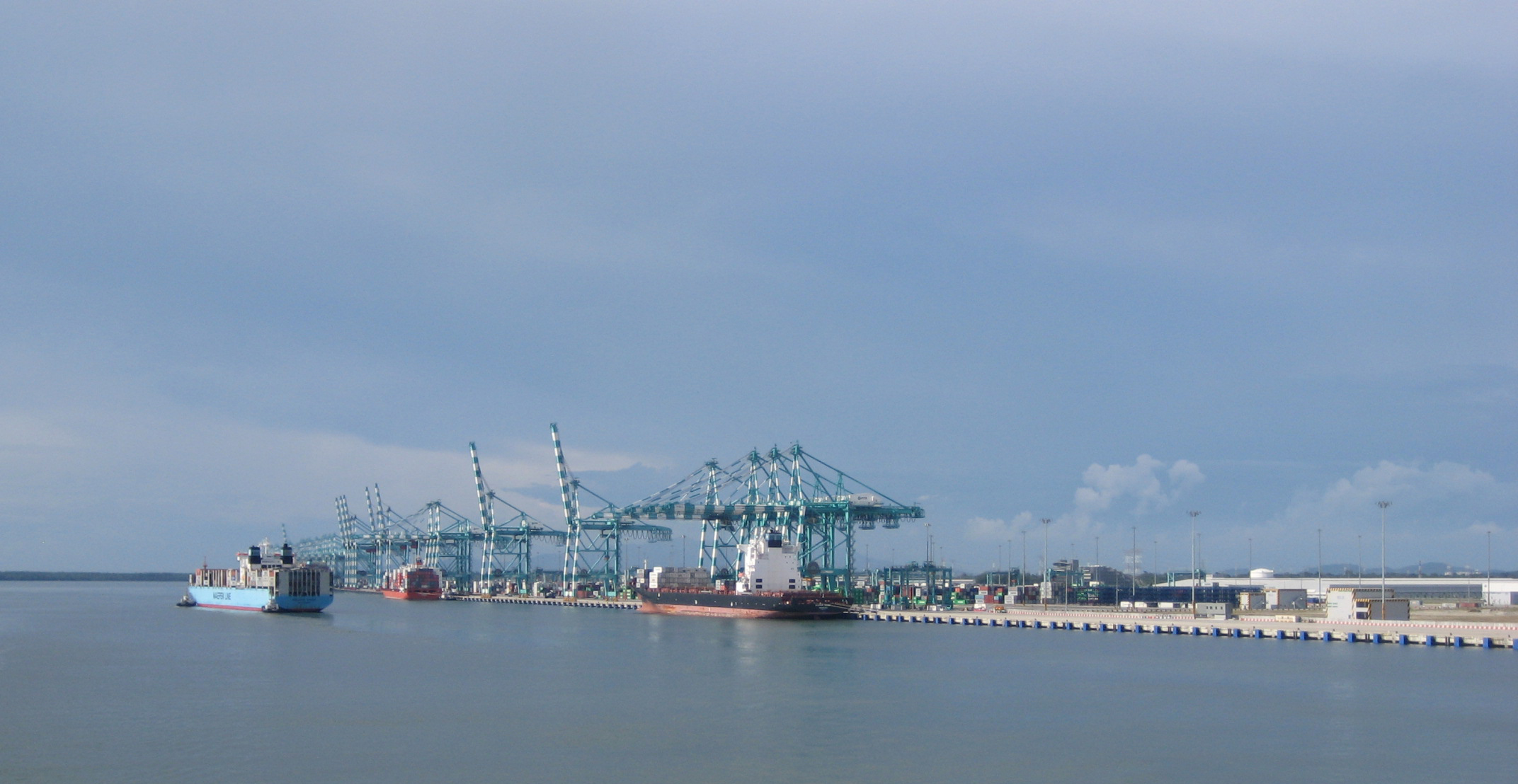
Port of Tanjung Pelepas, the 15th busiest port in the world and the largest transshipment hub in Malaysia

Johor's economy is mainly based on the tertiary sector, namely services, manufacturing, construction, etc. In 2023, the gross domestic product (GDP) of Johor was RM148.2 billion, the second highest among Malaysian states after Selangor and the largest outside the Klang Valley. The state's median income was RM5,652 in 2024, making it the state with the second highest median household income. In 2024, Johor had the fastest GDP growth rate among all Malaysian states and accounted for 9.6 per cent of Malaysia's GDP. The state has the largest services sector and real estate development outside the Klang Valley, with the former contributing 8.6 percent of the country's services sector's GDP in 2023.

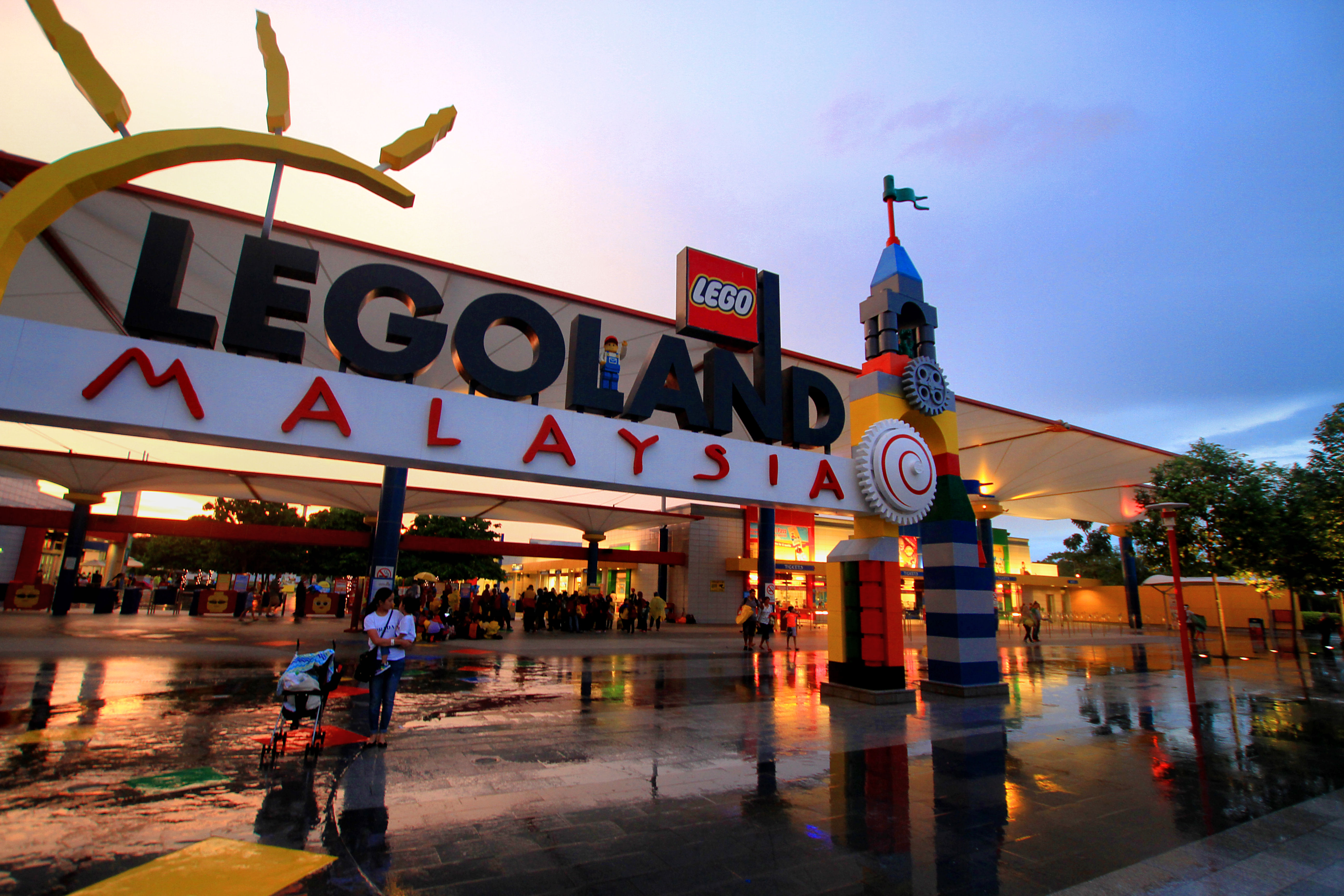
Legoland Malaysia Resort

Johor is the top investment destination in Malaysia. It has been ranked the top state in Malaysia for six consecutive years in approved manufacturing projects valued at RM145 billion from 2013 to 2018. The state attracted the highest foreign direct investment (FDI) among all Malaysian states in 2022, primarily in the manufacturing sector. In 2017, RM16.8 billion came from domestic direct investment and RM5.1 billion came from foreign direct investment, with Australia, China and the United States being the top three foreign investors in manufacturing. With the influx of foreign investments, Johor has also been ranked the second largest artificial intelligence hub globally.

Johor is the second largest trade contributor in Malaysia, and has the second largest share of the country's imports, after Selangor. The state is also Southeast Asia's largest data centre hub and the third largest in Asia Pacific. As a prominent regional manufacturing hub, the state is home to major multinational corporations (MNCs) in Malaysia, like ByteDance, Nvidia, Microsoft, Micron, Saudi Aramco, Foxconn, among others. Its capital city, Johor Bahru, has been ranked the world's 20th most attractive city for businesses, second in Malaysia after Kuala Lumpur, according to Oliver Wyman, a New York-based management consulting firm. Iskandar Malaysia located in southern Johor, is the largest special economic zone in Malaysia by investment value and GDP per capita, encompassing the city centre of Johor Bahru, Iskandar Puteri, Kulai District, Pasir Gudang and South Pontian. It is a major development zone in the nation with an area of 221,634 hectares (2,216.34 km^{2}). It primarily focuses on trading and services, manufacturing, business and finance, logistics, artificial intelligence, modern farming and ecotourism.

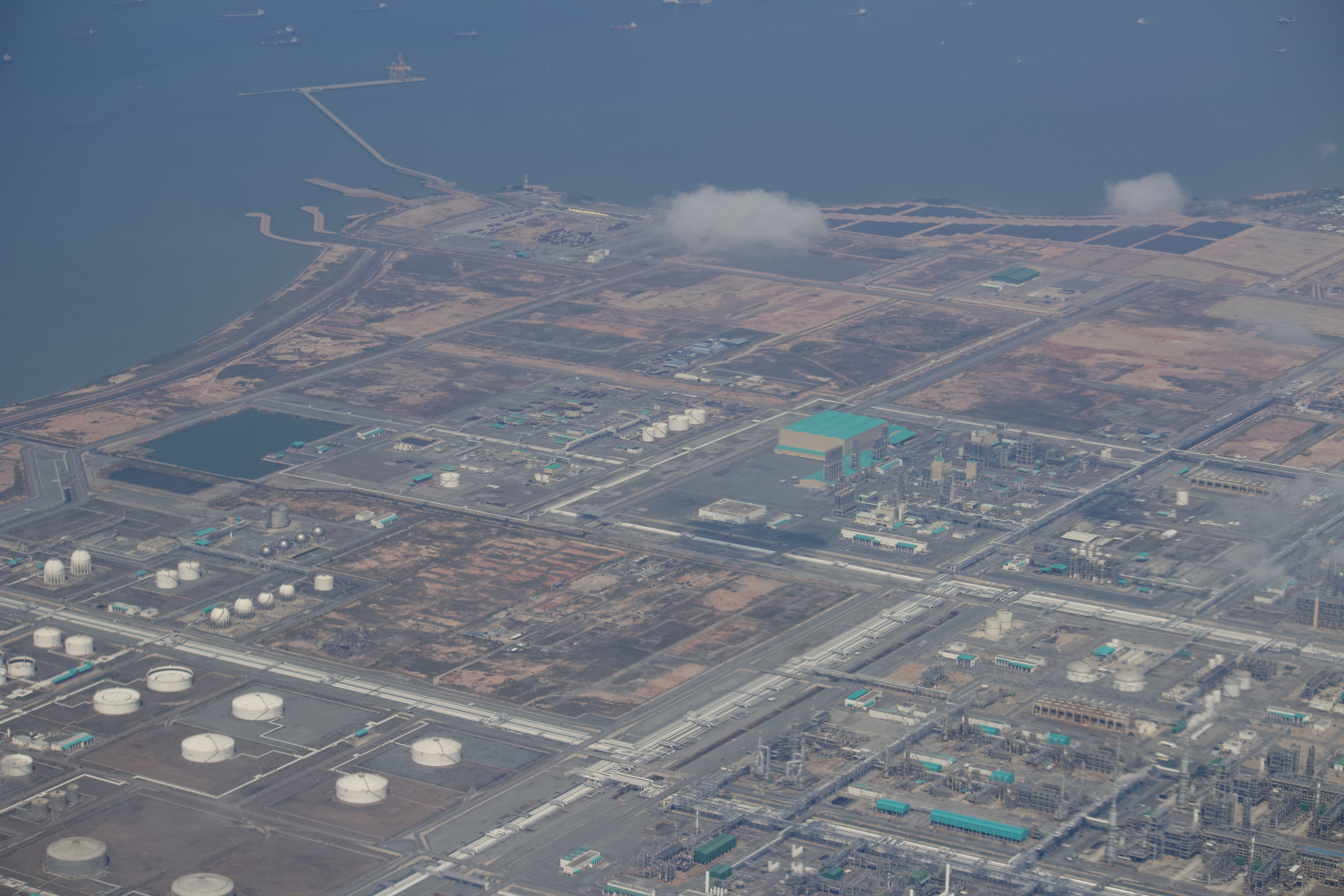
Pengerang Integrated Petroleum Complex (PIPC), the largest petrochemical hub in Malaysia

The total industrial area in the state as of 2015 was 144 km^{2} (56 sq mi) or 0.75 per cent of the land in Johor. The state also houses Johor Corporation, a state-owned conglomerate involved in various business activities in the state and overseas. Johor is also the largest agriculture output contributor in Malaysia. The main agricultural sectors in the state are palm oil plantations, rubber plantations, and produce. In 2015, land area used for agriculture in Johor covered 11,555 km^{2} (4,461 sq mi), 60.15 per cent of the state, with other plantations including herbs and spices. In 2016, palm oil plantations covered 7,456 km^{2} (2,879 sq mi) (38.8 per cent of the total land area), making it the third largest plantation area in Malaysia after Sabah and Sarawak. Farmers' markets (Malay: pasar peladang) are used to distribute the agricultural produces which are located around the state. Johor is the biggest fruit producer in Malaysia, with a total fruit plantation area of 414 km^{2} (160 sq mi) and total harvesting area of 305 km^{2} (118 sq mi). Approximately 532,249 tons of fruit was produced in 2016, with Segamat District having the largest major fruit plantation and harvesting area in the state with a total area of 111 km^{2} (43 sq mi) and 66 km^{2} (25 sq mi), respectively, while Kluang District had the highest total fruit production at 163,714 tons. In the same year, Johor was the second biggest producer of vegetables among Malaysian states after Pahang, with a total vegetable plantation area of 154 km^{2} (59 sq mi) and a total harvesting area of 143 km^{2} (55 sq mi). Kluang District also had the largest vegetable plantation and harvesting areas, with a total area of 36 km^{2} (14 sq mi), and the highest total vegetable production at 60,102 tons.

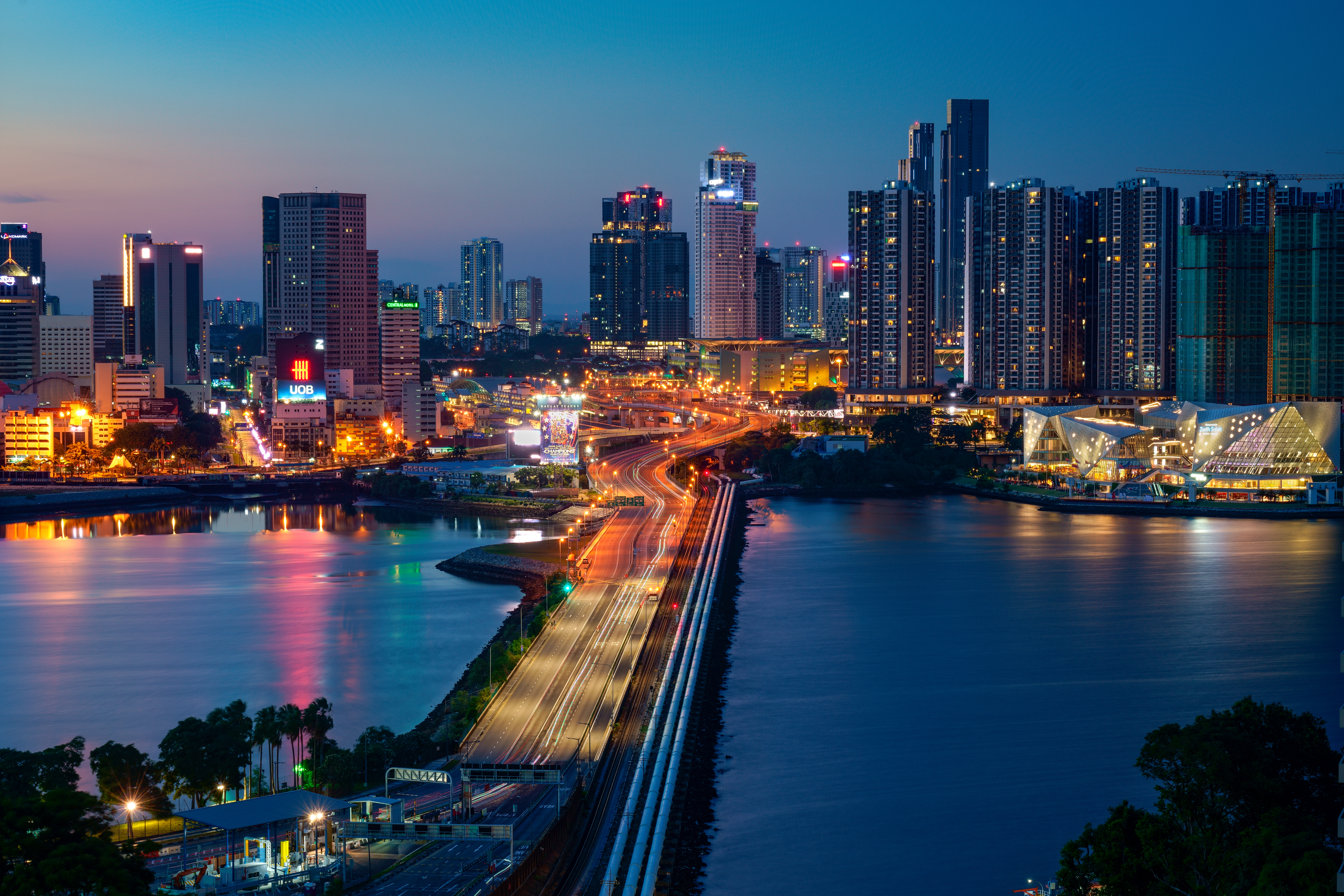
Johor–Singapore Causeway and Johor Bahru skyline

With the establishment of the Johor-Singapore Special Economic Zone, the state is set to rival Klang Valley, the main economic region in Malaysia, in the next decade. Johor benefits from Singaporean investors and tourists due to its close proximity to Singapore. From 1990 to 1992, approved Singaporean investments in Johor amounted to about US$500 million in 272 projects. In 1994, the investment from Singapore was nearly 40% of the state's total foreign investment. The state also had a policy of "twinning with Singapore" to promote their industrial development, which increased the movement of people and goods between the two. The close economic links between the two began with the establishment of the Indonesia–Malaysia–Singapore Growth Triangle (SIJORI Growth Triangle) in 1989.

== Utilities ==
The Johor Department of Economy Planning is responsible for all public infrastructure planning and development in the state, while the Landscape Department is responsible for the state's landscape development. Since the Ninth Malaysia Plan, the Johor Southern Corridor has been a focus for development. In 2010, the total state land used for commercial buildings was 21.53 km^{2} (8.31 sq mi), with Johor Bahru District accounting for 12.99 km^{2} (5.02 sq mi) or 63.5%. Since 2012, around RM2.63 billion has been allocated by the federal and state governments for 33 infrastructure projects in Pengerang in southeastern Johor. The 2015 state budget included spending more than RM500 million for development in the following year – the highest amount ever allocated. The state government also ensured that infrastructure and development projects would be fairly distributed to all districts in the state, with six focus areas outlined in the state government's strategic development plan in 2018. In the same year, the federal government allocated RM250 million for three infrastructure projects to improve connectivity and accessibility within the state capital. Following the recent change in the state government administration, the new government also pledged to provide better infrastructure for investors by improving the road network, providing an adequate water supply for factories and building sub-stations for electricity generation while rejecting foreign companies after discovering a foreign investor who claimed to use green technology to hide that he intended to use Johor as a waste disposal site.

=== Energy and water resources ===
Electricity distribution in the state is managed by Tenaga Nasional Berhad. Most electricity is generated by coal and gas-fired plants. The coal power plant had a capacity of 700 MW in 2007 and 3,100 MW in 2016, which originated from the Tanjung Bin Power Station in Pontian. Two gas-fired plants, Pasir Gudang Power Station with 210 MW and Sultan Iskandar Power Station with 269 MW, are located in Pasir Gudang. The Pasir Gudang Power Station was retired from the system in 2016. The state government has been planning to construct hydropower and combined cycle power plants since 2015 and 2018 respectively. A new combined cycle power plant was constructed on a greenfield site near the old decommissioned power plants in Pasir Gudang, named the Sultan Ibrahim Power Plant.

All water supply pipes in the state are managed by the Water Regulatory Bodies of Johor, with a total of 11 reservoirs: Congok, Gunung Ledang, Gunung Pulai 1, Gunung Pulai 2, Gunung Pulai 3, Juaseh, Layang Lower, Layang Upper, Lebam, Linggiu and Pontian Kechil. The state also supplies raw water to Singapore for RM0.03 for every 3.8 cubic metres (1,000 US gal) drawn from Johor rivers. In return, the Johor state government pays the Singaporean government 50 cents (RM0.50) for every 3.8 cubic metres of treated water from Singapore.

=== Telecommunication and broadcasting ===
As of August 2022, Johor had the largest 5G internet coverage in Malaysia, Johor Bahru's internet speed is also the fastest in Malaysia and second in Southeast Asia, after Singapore. Telecommunications in Johor were originally administered by the Posts and Telecommunication Department and maintained by the British Cable & Wireless Communications, which was responsible for all telecommunication services in Malaya. During this time, a troposcatter system was installed on Mount Pulai in Johor and Mount Serapi in Sarawak to connect radio signals between British Malaya and British Borneo, the only such system for both territories to allow simultaneous transmission of radio programs to North Borneo and Sarawak. In 1968, following the foundation of the Federation of Malaysia, the telecommunication departments in Malaya and Borneo merged to form the Telecommunications Department Malaysia, which later became Telekom Malaysia (TM). Early in 1964, Ericsson –a Nordic telecommunication company– began operating in the country. Following the first AXE telephone exchange in Southeast Asia that went online in Pelangi in 1980, TM was provided with the first mobile telephone network, named ATUR, in 1984. Since then, the Malaysia's cellular network has expanded rapidly. From 2013 until 2017, the state mobile-cellular penetration rate has reached 100%, with 11.3% to 11.5% of the population using the internet.

In 2018, the state internet speed was 10 Mbps with the government urging the Malaysian Communications and Multimedia Commission to develop high-speed Internet infrastructure to reach 100 Mbit/s to match the state's current rapid development. The Malaysian federal government operates one radio channel – Johor FM through its Department of Broadcasting, officially known as Radio Televisyen Malaysia. There is one independent radio station, Best FM, which launched in 1988. Television broadcasting in the state is divided into terrestrial and satellite television. There are two types of free-to-air television providers, MYTV Broadcasting (digital terrestrial) and Astro NJOI (satellite), while IPTV is accessed via Unifi TV through the UniFi fibre optic internet subscription.

== Transportation ==
=== Roads ===
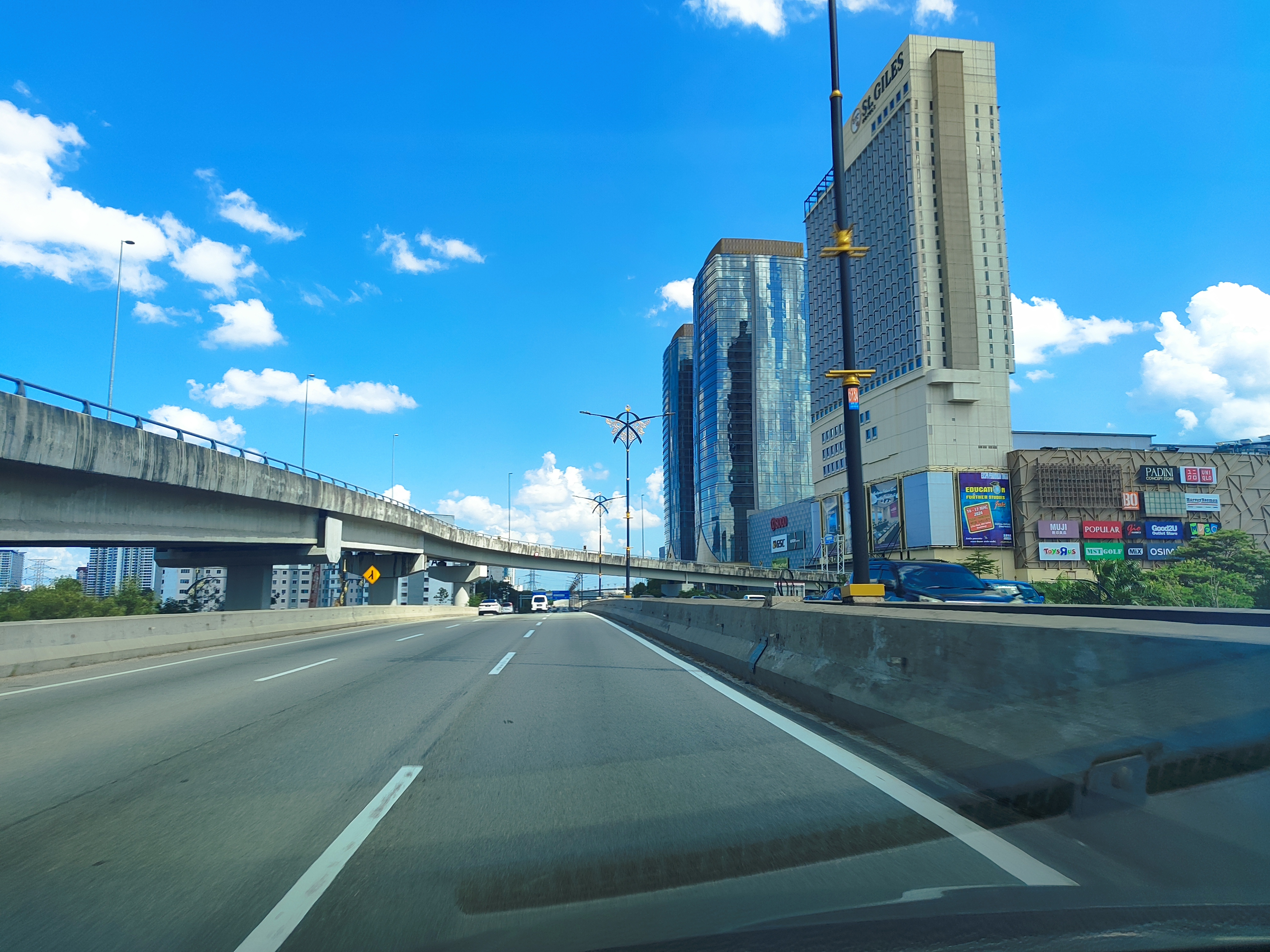
Johor Bahru Eastern Dispersal Link Expressway, a major expressway leading to the city centre, from the rest of Malaysia

The state is linked to the other Malaysian states and federal territories on the western coast through the North–South Expressway and on the eastern coast through Malaysia Federal Route 3. Since British colonial times, there has been a road system linking Johor's capital in the southern Malay Peninsula to Kangar in the north and Kota Bharu on the east coast. The roads in Johor are classified into two categories; 2,369 kilometres (1,472 mi) are federal roads while 19,329 kilometres (12,010 mi) are state roads, as of 2016. Johor uses a dual carriageway with the left-hand traffic rule, and towns in the state provide public transportation services such as buses and taxis along with Grab services. The Sungai Johor Bridge is in Johor, which is the longest central span river-crossing bridge in Malaysia and connects Johor Bahru and Kota Tinggi District. There are various expressways in the state capital city, including Tebrau Highway, Johor Bahru Eastern Dispersal Link Expressway, Pasir Gudang Highway, and others. In 2018, construction of the Iskandar Malaysia Bus Rapid Transit was announced to be completed before 2021.

The previous federal government had allocated RM29.43 billion as part of the Eleventh Malaysia Plan for infrastructure projects including upgrading roads and bridges. The state government also spends over RM600 million on road maintenance annually.

=== Rail ===
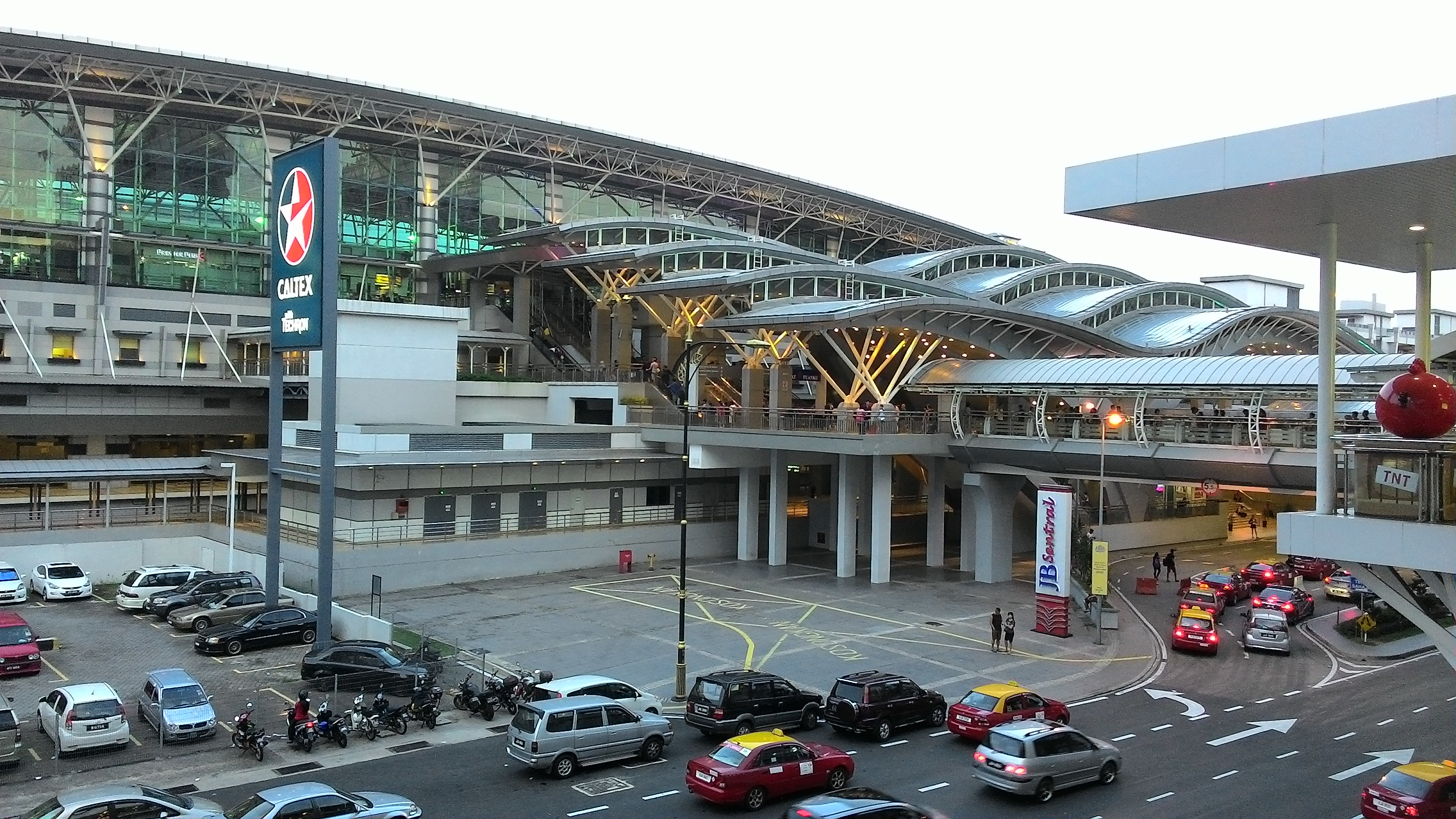
Johor Bahru Sentral railway station in Johor Bahru

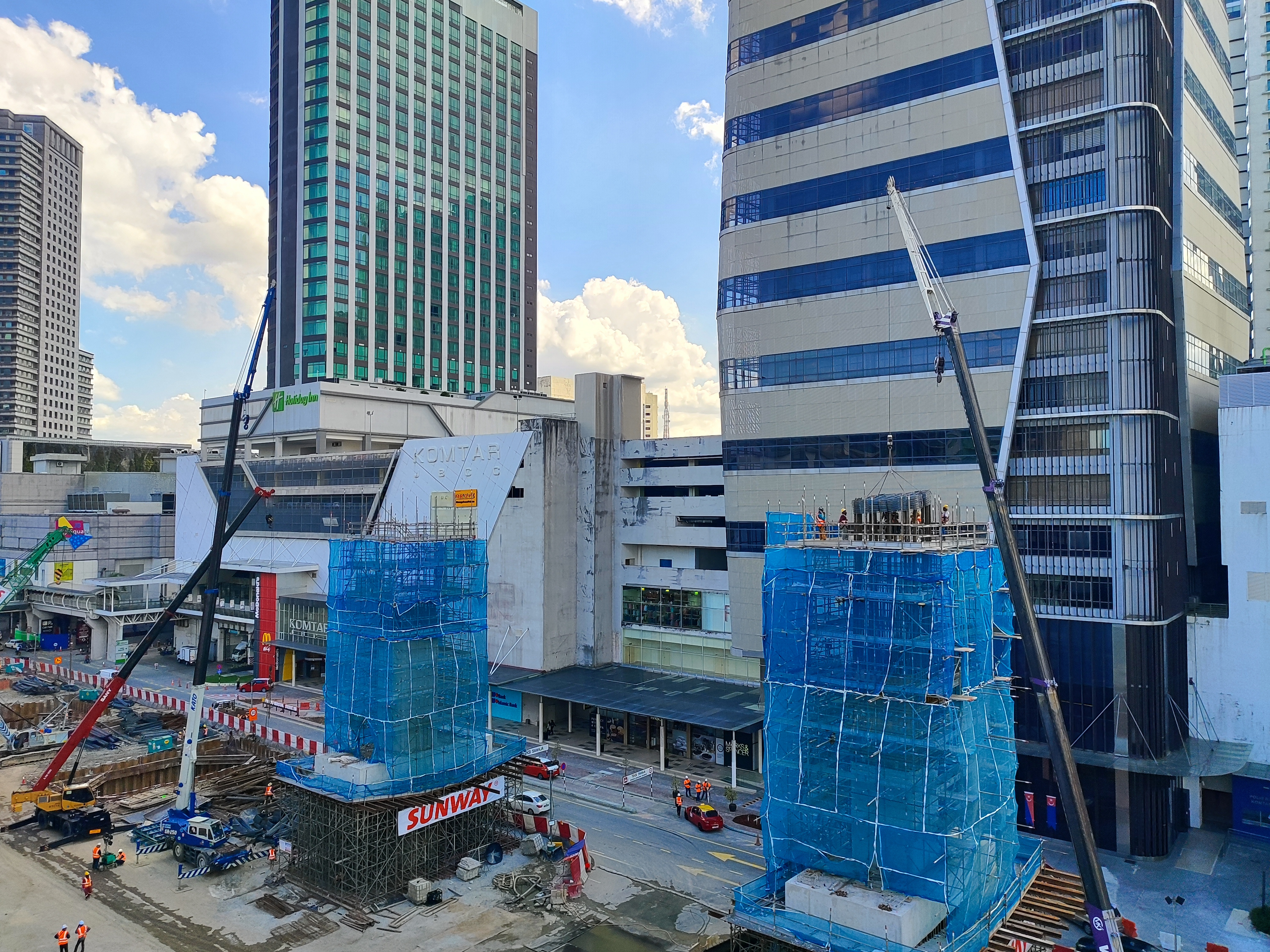
RTS Bukit Chagar Station under construction in Johor Bahru City Centre

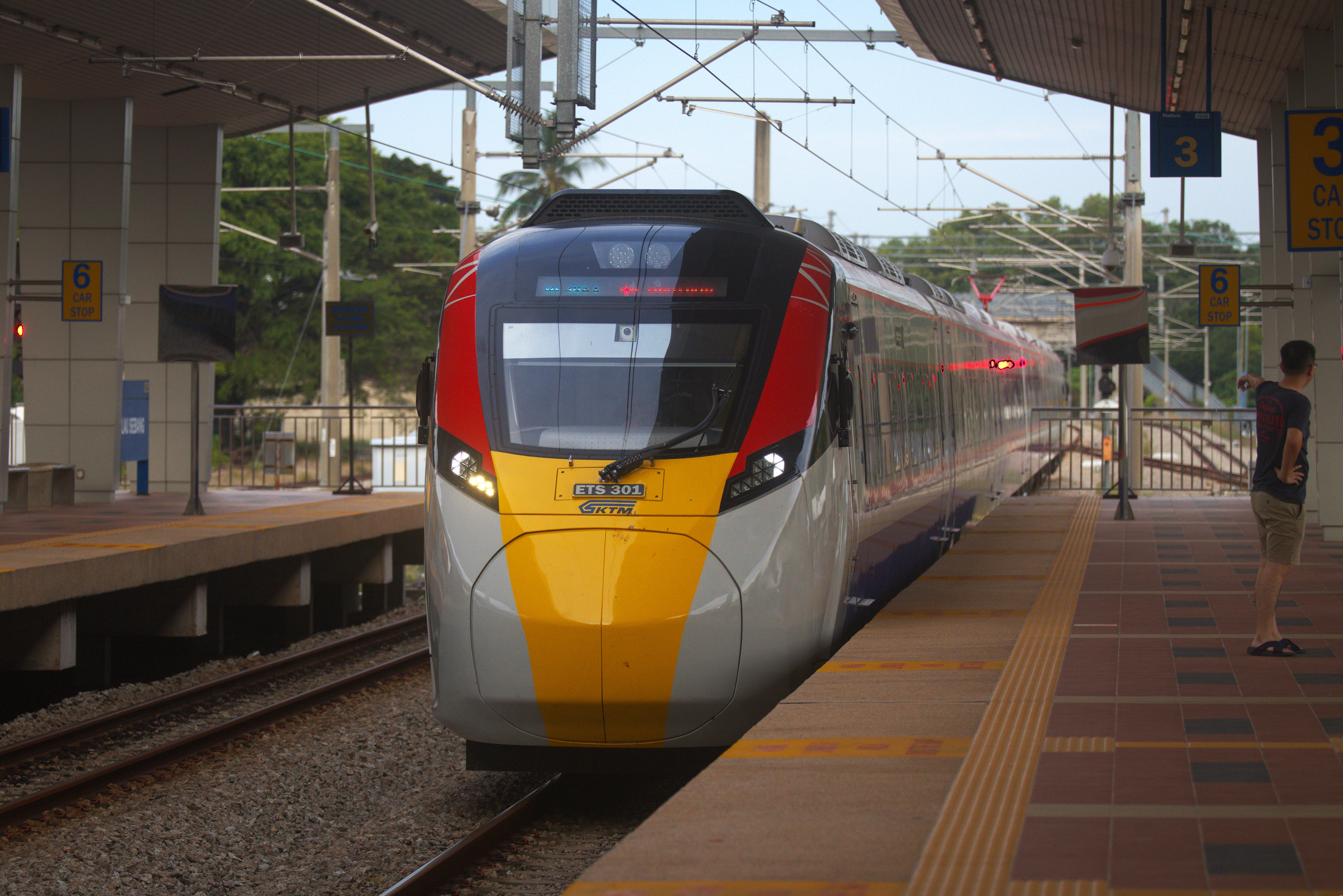
The KTM ETS service was extended to the state in 2025.

Rail transport in the state is operated by Keretapi Tanah Melayu (KTM). The railway line is connected to all of the states in western Peninsular Malaysia. It is also connected to stations in Singapore and Thailand. The KTM ETS service was extended into Johor in 2025, beginning with Segamat railway station in March, towards Kluang railway station in August and Johor Bahru Sentral station in December.

With its full completion, travel time by rail between Kuala Lumpur Sentral station and Johor Bahru Sentral station was reduced to 3.5 hours. The upcoming Johor Bahru–Singapore Rapid Transit System (RTS Link) linking Johor Bahru to Woodlands, Singapore will be the first rapid transit system outside the Klang Valley.

=== Air ===
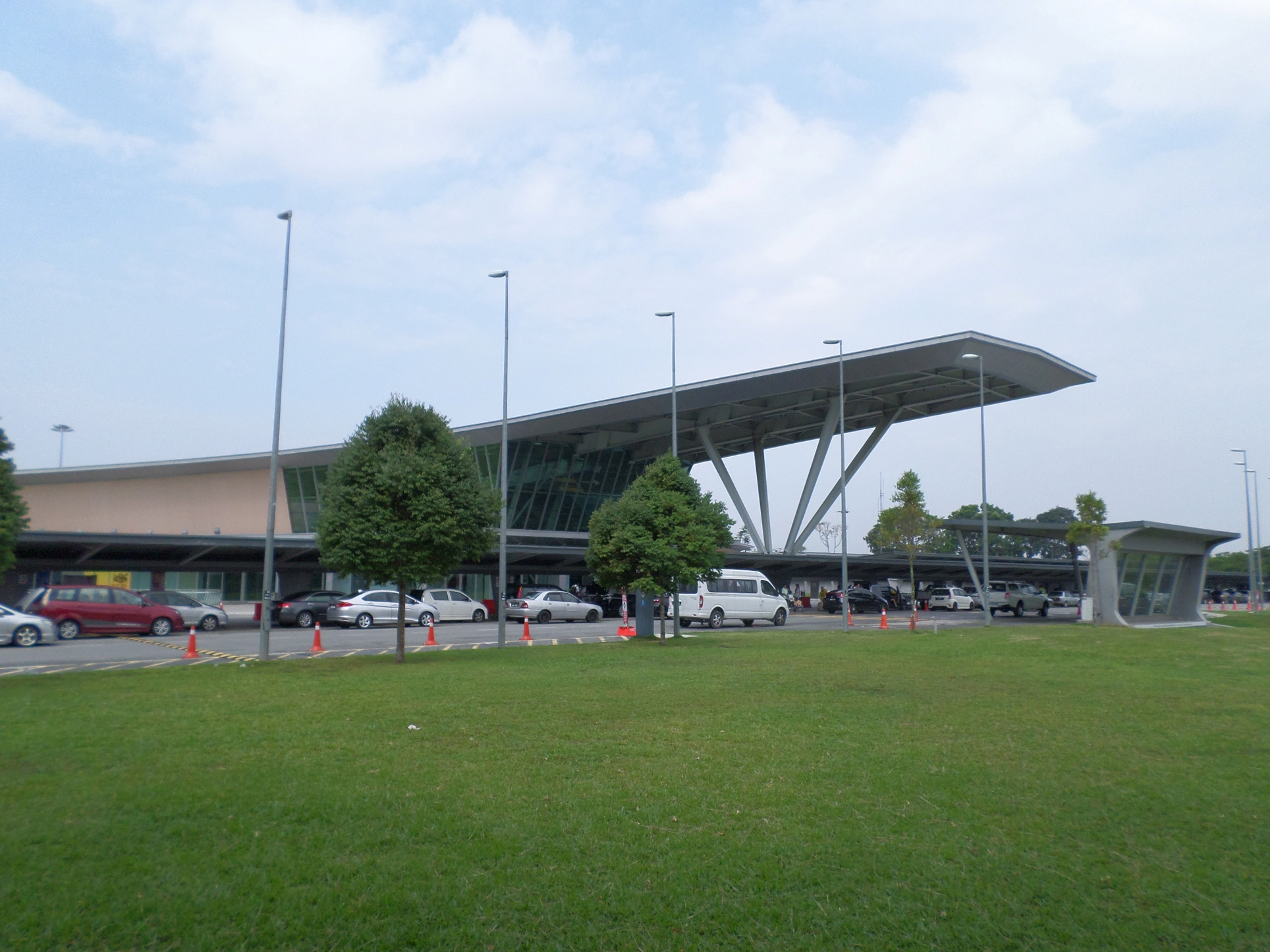
Senai International Airport

The Senai International Airport is the largest and the only international airport in Johor, which acts as the main gateway to the state. The airport is located in Senai Town, Kulai District. In 2016, the Malaysian federal government approved a total of RM7 million in upgrades for the airport. Four airlines fly to Johor: AirAsia, Malaysia Airlines, Firefly and Batik Air Malaysia. Other minor airports including Kluang Airport, Mersing Airport, Segamat Airstrip and Batu Pahat Airstrip in Kluang District, Mersing District, Segamat District and Batu Pahat District, respectively.

=== Water ===
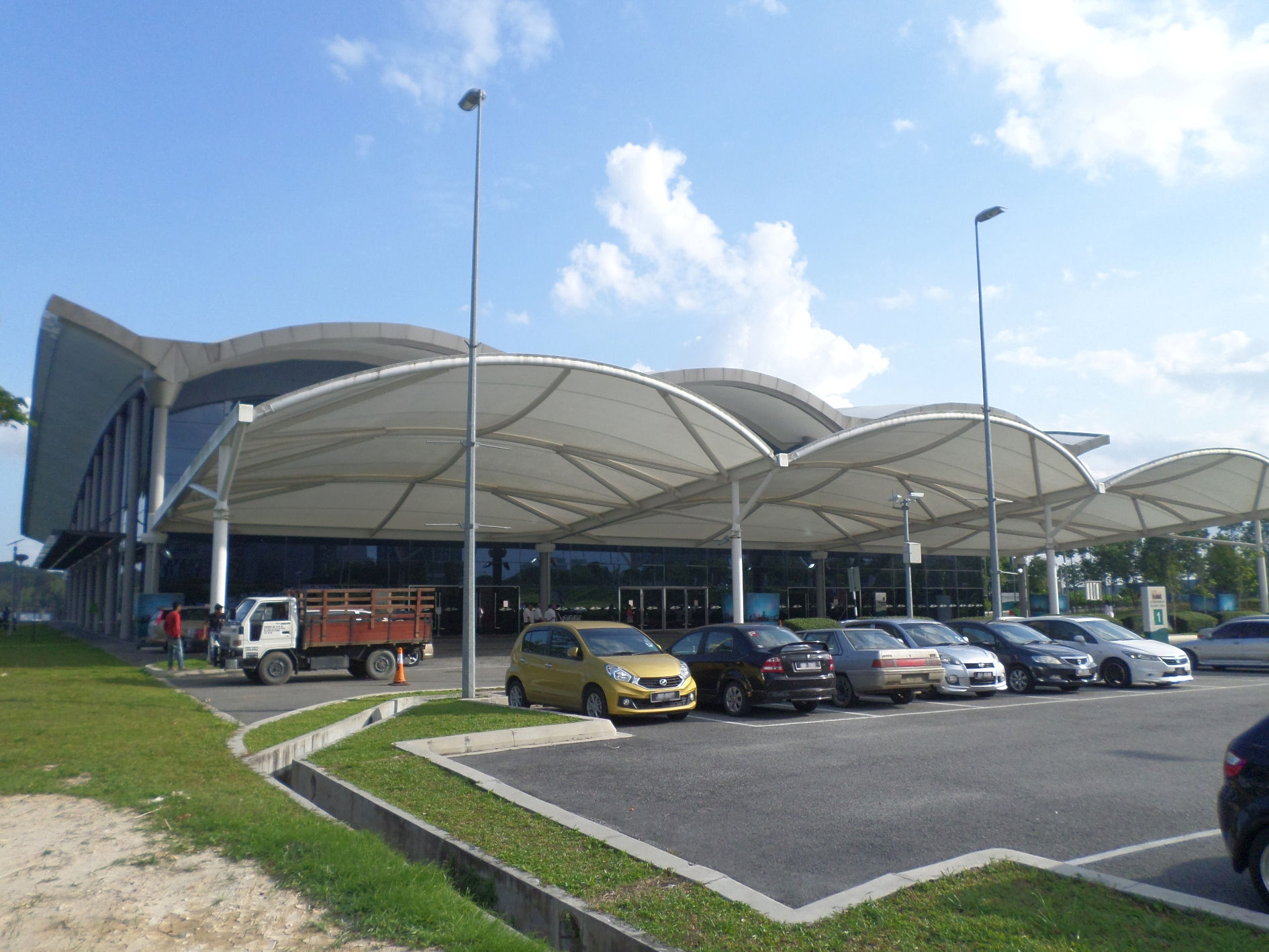
Puteri Harbour International Ferry Terminal in Iskandar Puteri

Johor has four ports in Iskandar Puteri and Pasir Gudang, which operate under three different companies. The Port of Tanjung Pelepas in western Iskandar Malaysia is currently the 15th busiest port in the world, and the largest transshipment hub in Malaysia. Johor also has two other container ports, the Integrated Container Terminal in Tanjung Langsat and Johor Port in Pasir Gudang. The Tanjung Langsat Terminal serves as the state's regional oil and gas hub and supports offshore petroleum exploration and production, while Johor Port is the world's largest palm oil terminal. There are boat services to ports in Batam and Tanjung Pinang of the Bintan Islands in Indonesia and to port in Changi in Singapore.

== Healthcare ==
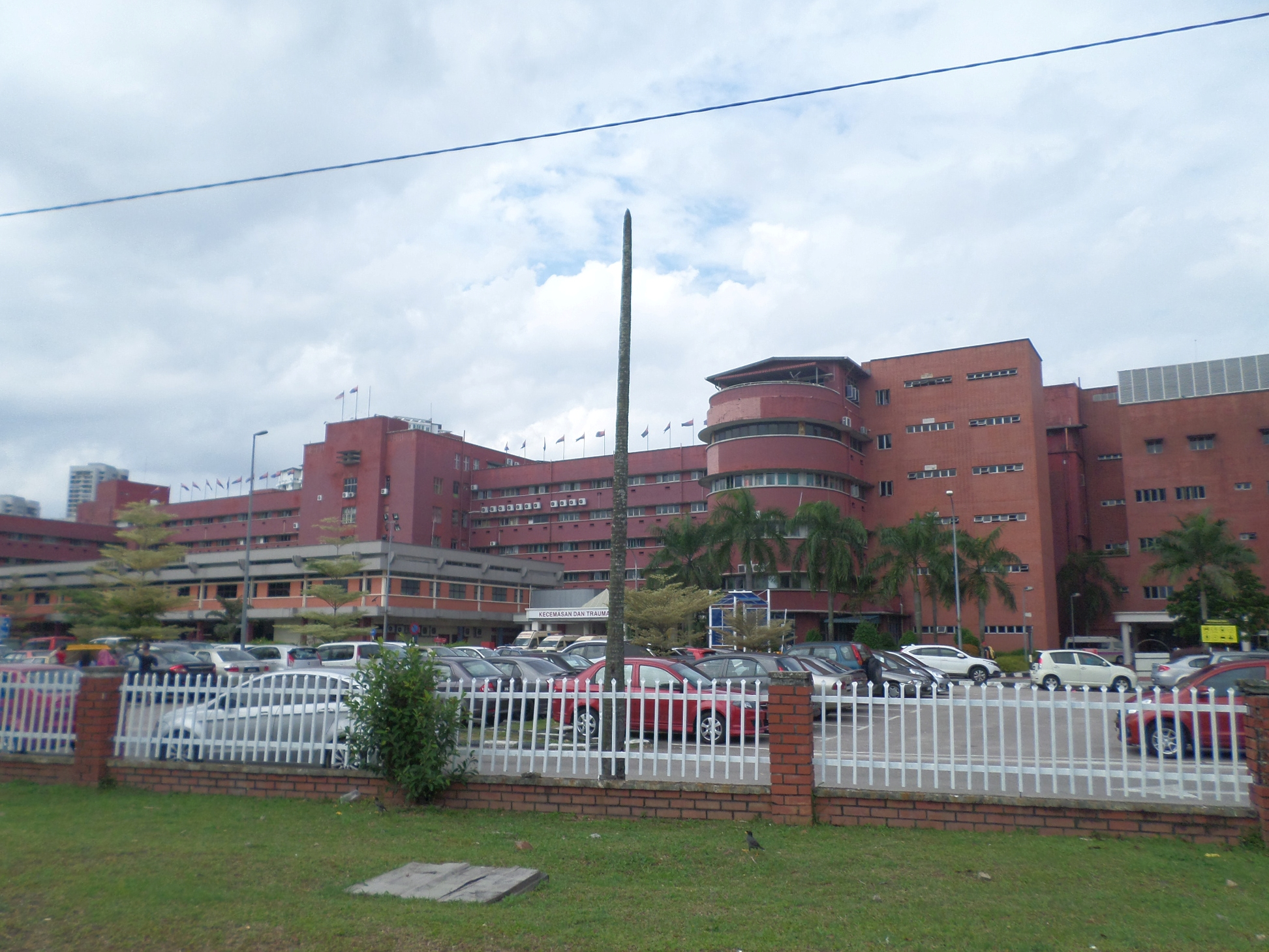
Sultanah Aminah Hospital, the main government hospital in the state

Health-related matters in Johor are administered by the Johor State Health Office (Malay: Jabatan Kesihatan Negeri Johor). The state has two major government hospitals, Sultanah Aminah Hospital and Sultan Ismail Hospital, nine government district hospitals Permai Hospital, Sultanah Fatimah Hospital, Sultanah Nora Ismail Hospital, Enche' Besar Hajjah Khalsom Hospital, Segamat Hospital, Pontian Hospital, Kota Tinggi Hospital, Mersing Hospital, and Tangkak Hospital, and Temenggung Seri Maharaja Tun Ibrahim Hospital, a women's and children's hospital and mental hospital. Other public health clinics, 1Malaysia clinics and rural clinics are scattered throughout the state with a number of private hospitals such as Penawar Hospital, Johor Specialist Hospital, Regency Specialist Hospital, Pantai Hospital Batu Pahat, Putra Specialist Hospital Batu Pahat, Puteri Specialist Hospital, KPJ Specialist Hospital Muar, Abdul Samad Specialist Hospital, Columbia Asia, Gleneagles Medini Hospital and KPJ Specialist Hospital Pasir Gudang. In 2009, the state's doctor–patient ratio was 3 per 1,000 population.

== Education ==
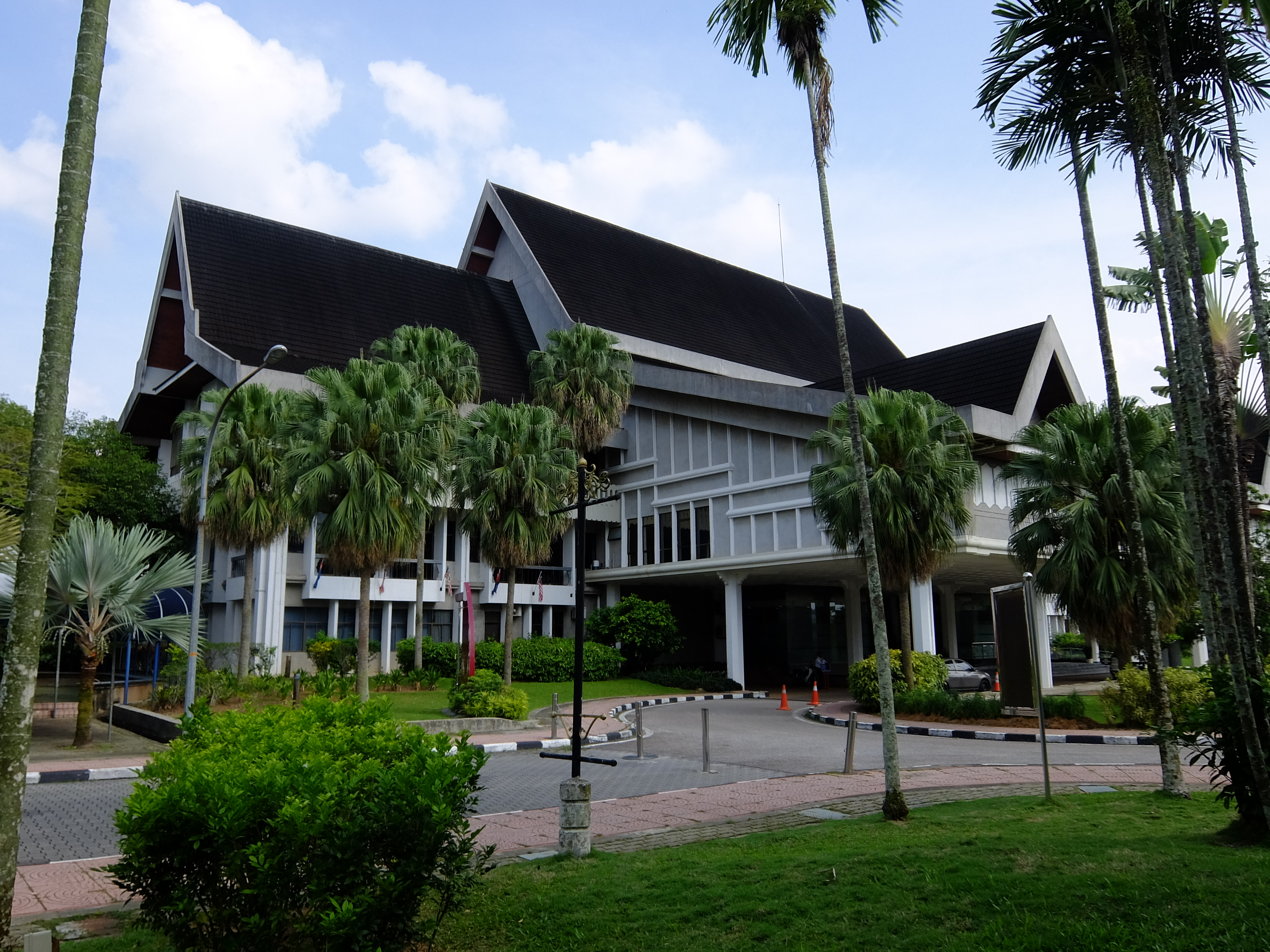
University of Technology Malaysia

All primary and secondary schools are under the jurisdiction of the Johor State Education Department, under the guidance of the national Ministry of Education. The oldest school in Johor is the English College Johore Bahru (1914). As of 2013, Johor had a total of 240 government secondary schools, fifteen international schools (Austin Heights Private and International Schools, Crescendo-HELP International School, Crescendo International College, Excelsior International School, Paragon Private and International School, Seri Omega Private and International School, Sri Ara International Schools, StarClub Education, Sunway International School, Tenby Schools Setia Eco Gardens, UniWorld International School, and Raffles American School and three international campuses of British Marlborough College, R.E.A.L Schools and Utama Schools), and nine Chinese independent schools. Johor has a considerable number of Malay and indigenous students enrolled in Chinese schools. There is also an Indonesian school in the state capital mainly for the children of Indonesian migrants. There are two Japanese learning centres in Johor Bahru. The state government also emphasises pre-school education in the state with the establishment of several kindergartens such as Nuri Kindergarten and Childcare, Stellar Preschool and Tadika Kastil.

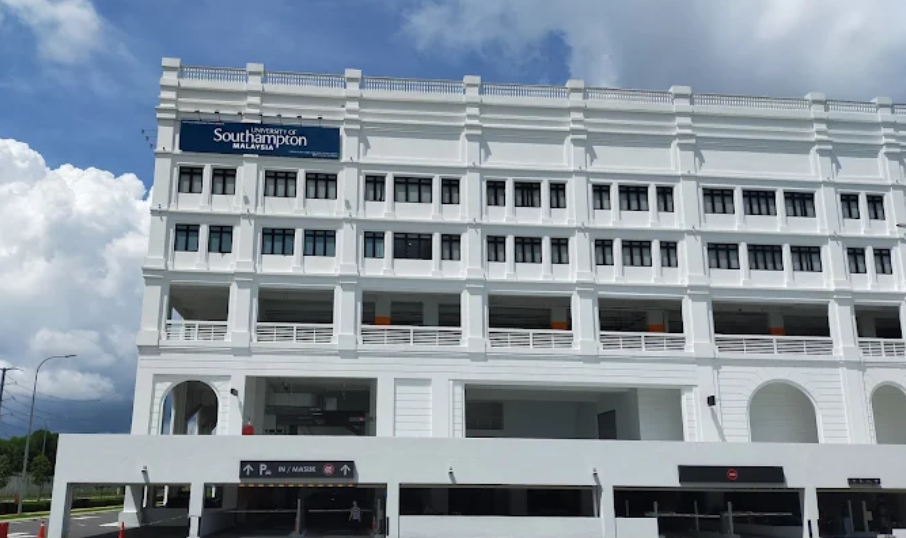
University of Southampton Malaysia campus in Iskandar Puteri

Johor has three public universities, the University of Technology Malaysia (UTM) in Skudai, Tun Hussein Onn University of Malaysia in Parit Raja, and Universiti Teknologi MARA Johor in Jementah and the state capital. As of 2024, UTM is the second highest ranked university in Malaysia, after University of Malaya, according to Webometrics Ranking of World Universities. EduHub Pagoh, the largest public higher education hub in Malaysia, is being constructed at Bandar Universiti Pagoh, a new planned education township in Muar. The state also houses a number of international university branches, including Newcastle University Medicine Malaysia, Netherlands Maritime Institute of Technology, University of Southampton Malaysia, University of Reading Malaysia, Monash University Malaysia Clinical School, and others.

There are several polytechnics including Ibrahim Sultan Polytechnic and Mersing Polytechnic; and two teaching colleges, IPG Kampus Temenggong Ibrahim in Johor Bahru and IPG Kampus Tun Hussien Onn in Batu Pahat. It has one non-profit community college, Southern University College in Skudai. There is also a proposal to establish the University of Johor that has been welcomed by the Sultan of Johor with the federal education ministry also willing to extend their co-operation.

To ensure the quality of education in the state, the state government introduced six long-term measures to upgrade the capability of local teachers. In 2018, it was reported that Johor was among several Malaysian states facing a teacher shortage, so the federal education ministry set up a special committee to study ways to tackle the problem.

The Johor State Library is the main public library in the state.

== Demography ==
=== Ethnicity and immigration ===
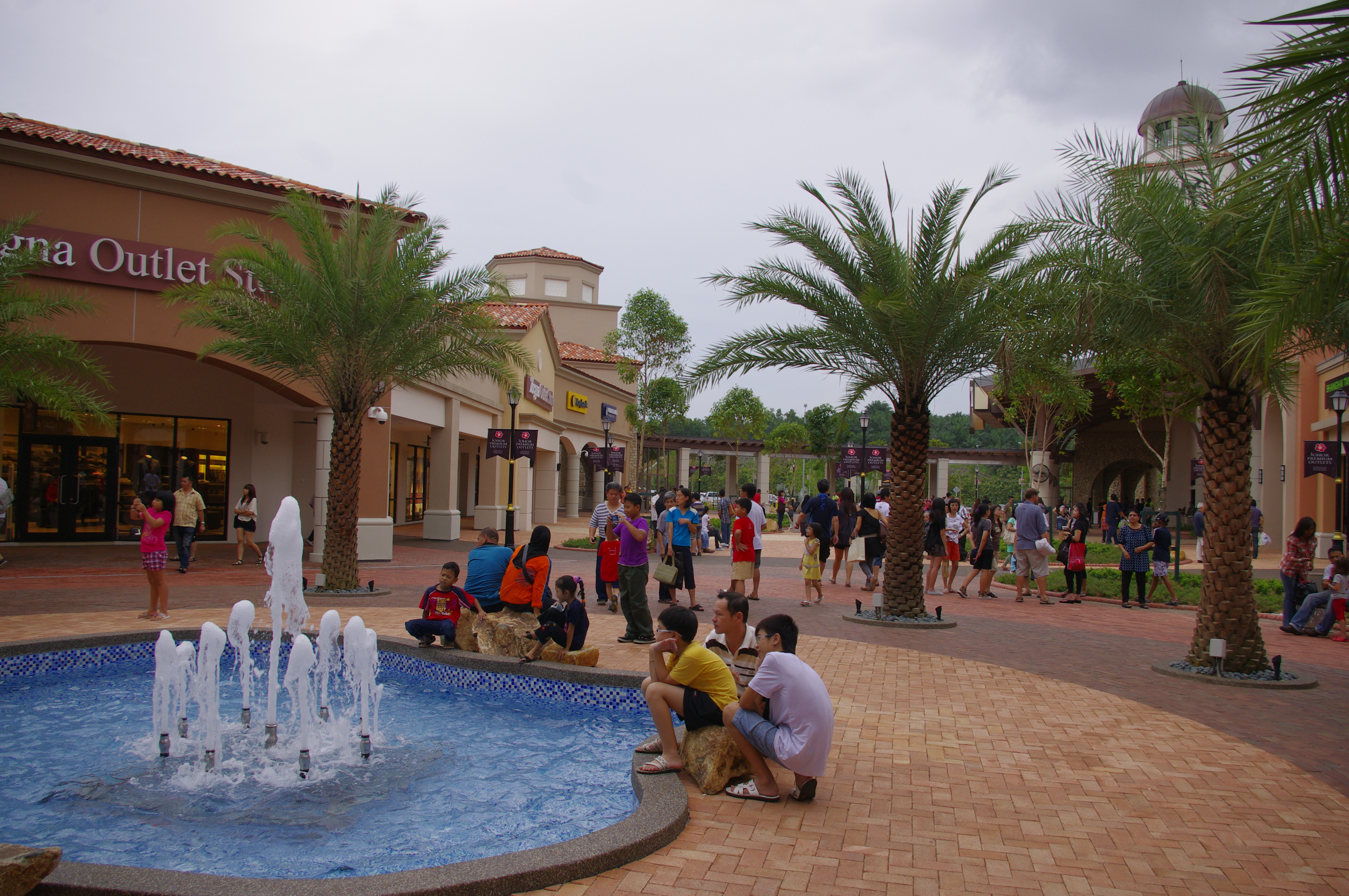
Johor residents with families near the end of the year, at the Johor Premium Outlets

Historical population
| Year | Pop. | ±% |
|---|---|---|
| 1970 | 1,277,180 | — |
| 1980 | 1,580,423 | +23.7% |
| 1991 | 2,069,740 | +31.0% |
| 2000 | 2,584,997 | +24.9% |
| 2010 | 3,230,440 | +25.0% |
| 2020 | 4,009,670 | +24.1% |

The 2023 Malaysian census reported the population of Johor at 4,100,900, with a non-citizen population of 276,900, making it the second most populous state in Malaysia, after Selangor. Of the Malaysian residents, 2,464,640 (60.1%) are Bumiputera, 1,312,128 (32.8%) are Chinese, 246,054 (6.0%) are Indian. In 2010, the population was estimated to be around 3,348,243, with 1,972,115 (58.9%) Bumiputera, 1,292,421(38.6%) Chinese, 237,725 (7.1%) Indian. Despite the racial diversity of the population, most people in Johor identify themselves as "Bangsa Johor" (English: Johor race), which is also echoed by Johor's royal family to unite the population regardless of ancestry. Johor Bahru District, anchoring the state capital Johor Bahru, is currently the second most populous district in Malaysia with a population of 1.8 million, as of 2023.

Ethnic groups in Johor (2023)
| Ethnic | Percent |
| Bumiputera | 60.1% |
| Chinese | 32.8% |
| Indian | 6.6% |
| Non-Malaysian citizen | 6.0% |

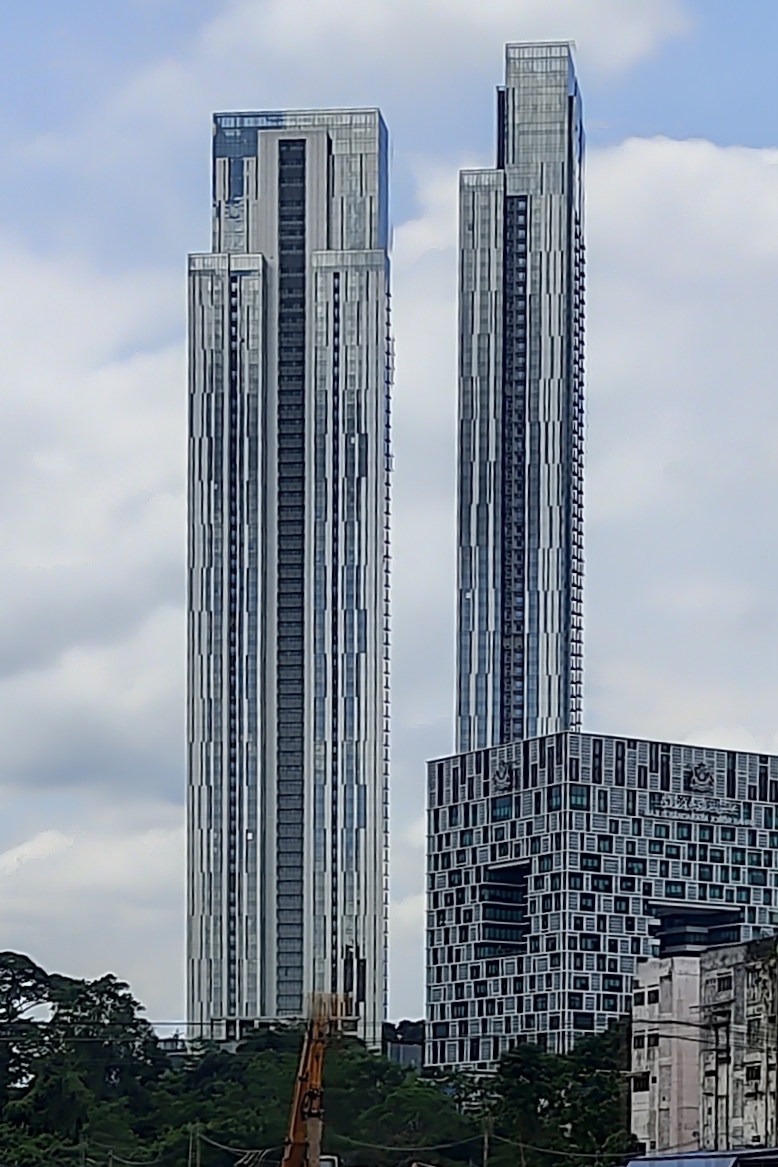
The Astaka is the tallest residential building in Southeast Asia.

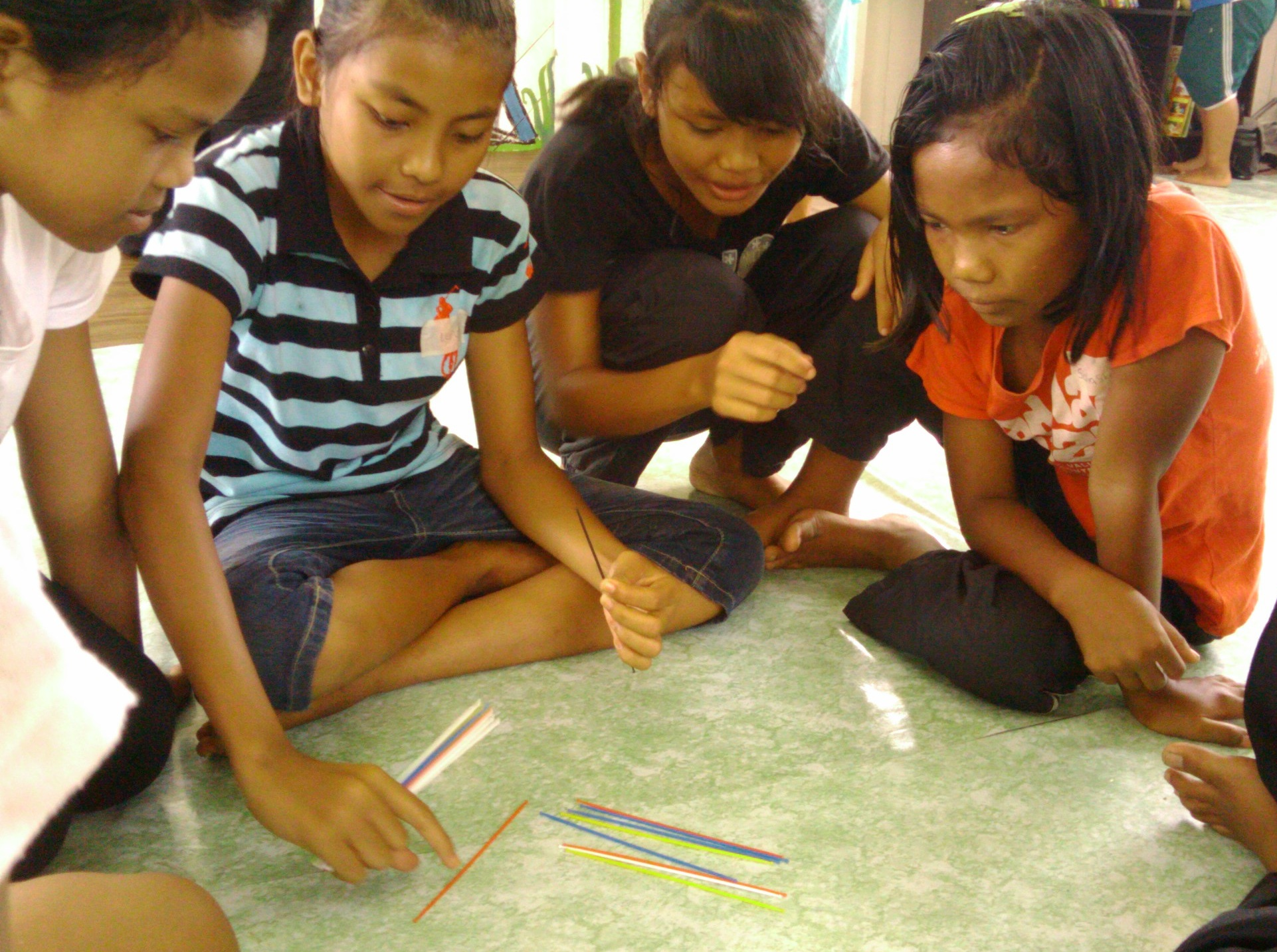
Girls from the aboriginal people of Johor

As Malaysia is one of the least densely populated countries in Asia, the state is particularly sparsely populated, with most people concentrated in the coastal urban areas, since towns and urban centres have massively expanded through recent developments. From 1991 to 2000, the state experienced a 2.39% average annual population growth, with Johor Bahru District being the highest at 4.59% growth and Segamat District being the lowest at 0.07%. The total population increased by about 600,000 every decade following the increase of residential developments in the southern developmental region; if the pattern continues, Johor will have an estimated 5.6 million people in 2030, larger than the government projection of 4 million.

Johor is among the most popular destinations for expatriates in the region. Its strategic geographical position has contributed to the state's rapid development as Malaysia's transportation and industrial hub, creating jobs and attracting migrants from other states and overseas, especially from Singapore, China, Indonesia, the Philippines, Vietnam, Myanmar, Bangladesh, India and Pakistan. As of 2018, nearly two thirds of foreign workers in Malaysia were located in Johor, Kuala Lumpur and Selangor, according to World Bank. Due to its rapid development and diversified economy, Johor attracted the highest number of inter-state migrants among all Malaysian states, with an influx of over 11.9 thousand people in 2020, despite dropping in 2022.

=== Religion ===
Religion in Johor (2022)
| Religion | Percent |
| Islam | 58.7% |
| Buddhism | 25.9% |
| Christianity | 8.2% |
| Hinduism | 6% |
| No religion/Unknown | 0.2% |
| Others | 0.3% |

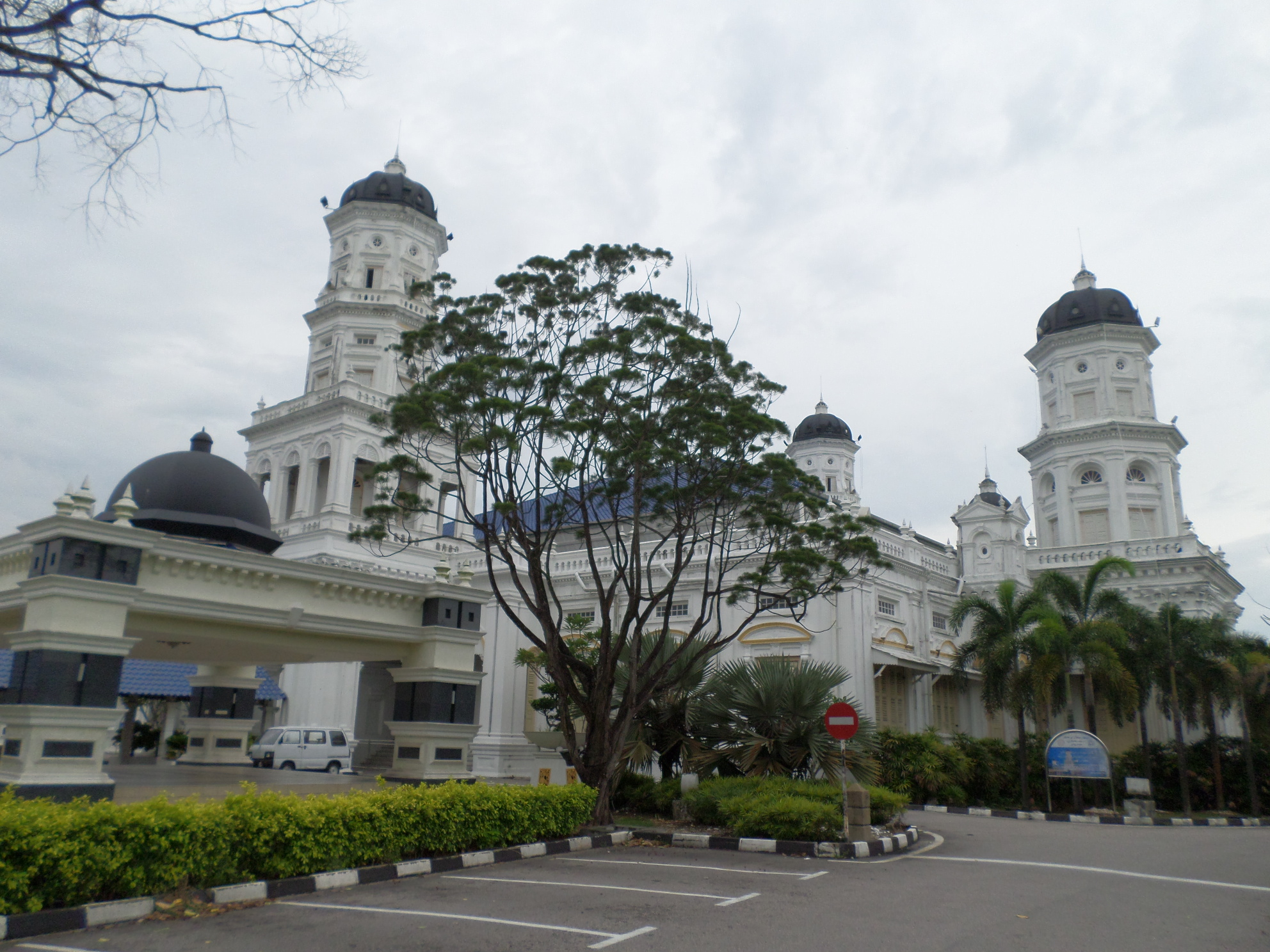
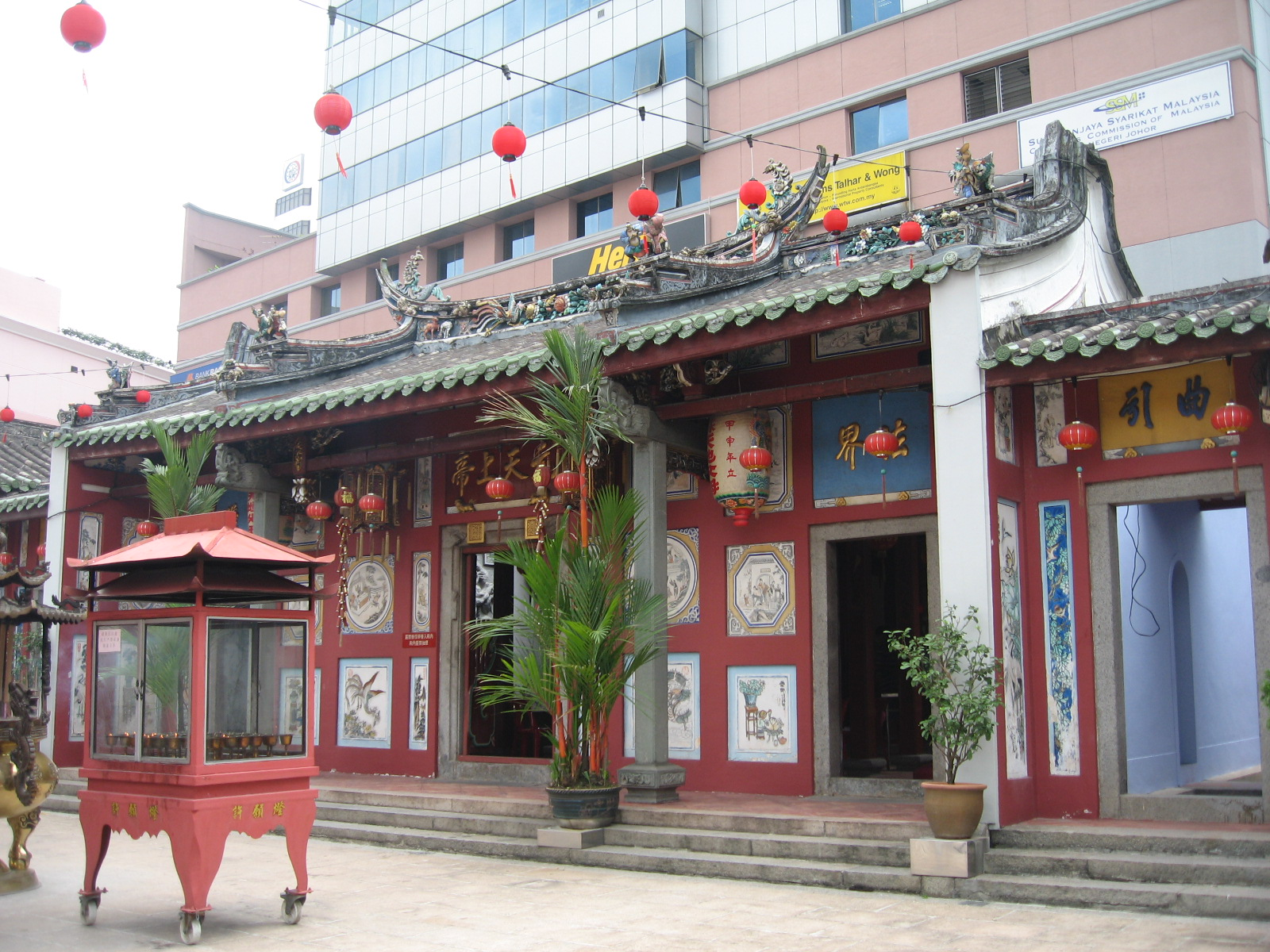
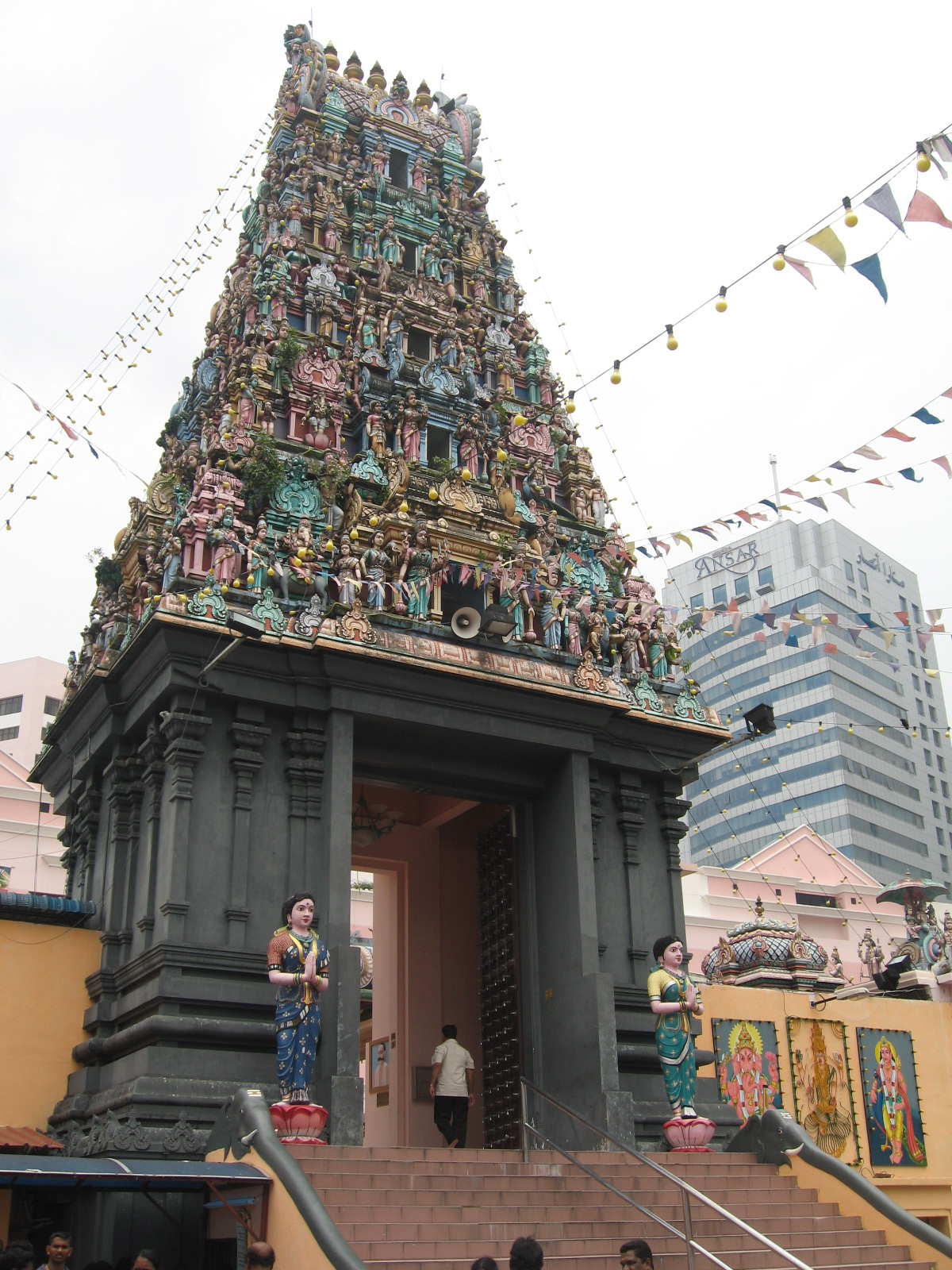
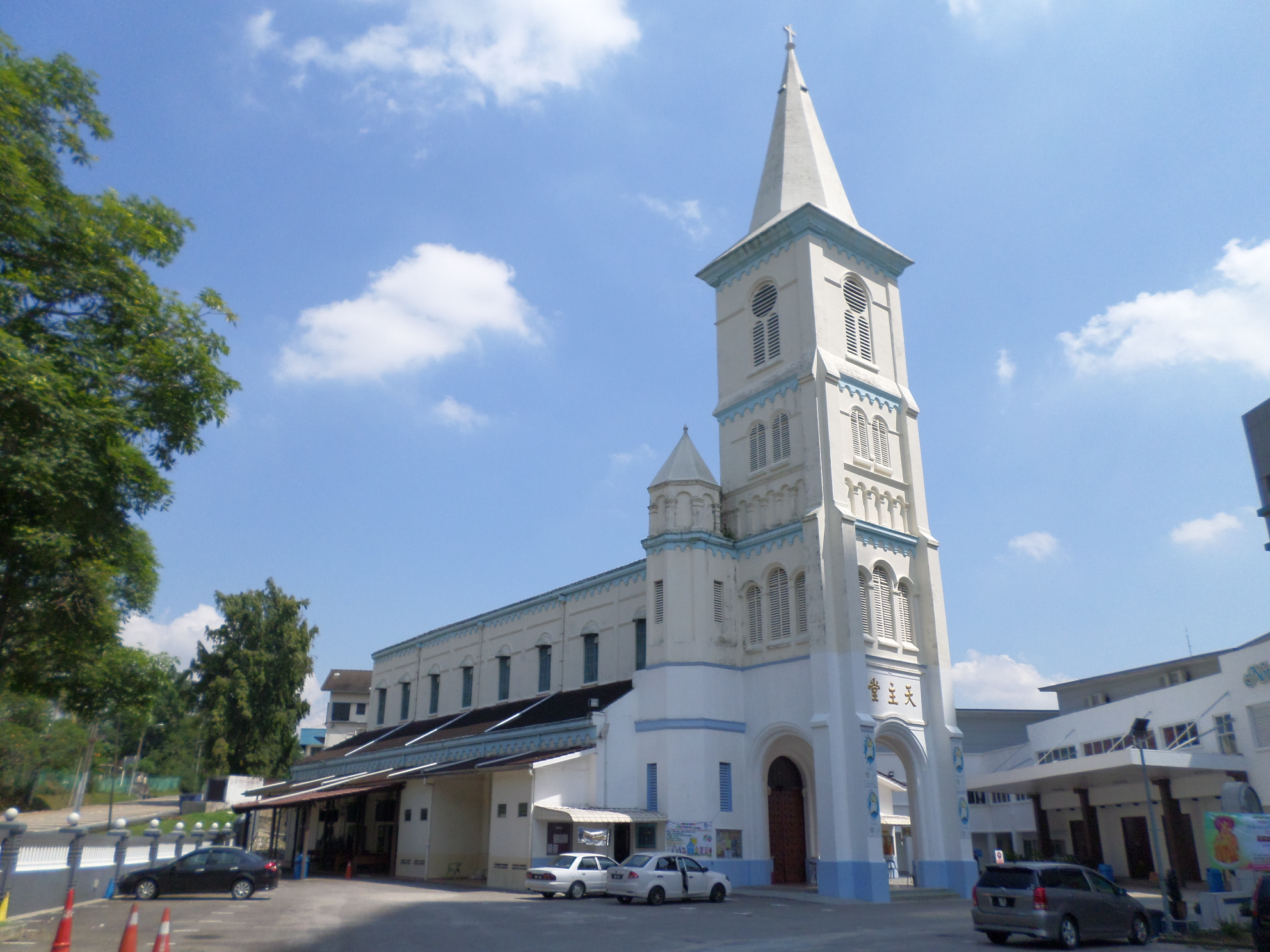
Place of worship in Johor. Clockwise from top right: Johor Bahru Old Chinese Temple, Church of the Immaculate Conception, Sri Mariamman Temple and the Sultan Abu Bakar State Mosque.

Islam became the state religion upon the adoption of the 1895 Johor Constitution, although other religions can be freely practised. According to the 2020 Malaysian census the religious affiliation of Johor's population was 58.7% Muslim, 25.9% Buddhist, 8.2% Christian, 6% Hindu, 0.1% followers of other religions or unknown affiliations, 0.2% Taoist or Chinese folk religion adherents, and 0.2% non-religious. The census indicated that 80.2% of the Chinese population in Johor identified as Buddhists, with significant minorities identifying as Christians (18.2%), Chinese folk religion adherents (1.6%) and Muslims (0.2%). The majority of the Indian population identified as Hindus (73.5%), with significant minorities identifying as Christians (6.1%), Muslims (9.2%) and Buddhists (2.8%). The non-Malay bumiputera community was predominantly Christians (68.3%), with significant minorities identifying as Muslims (21.6%) and Buddhists (15%). Among the majority population, all Malay bumiputera identified as Muslims.

=== Languages ===
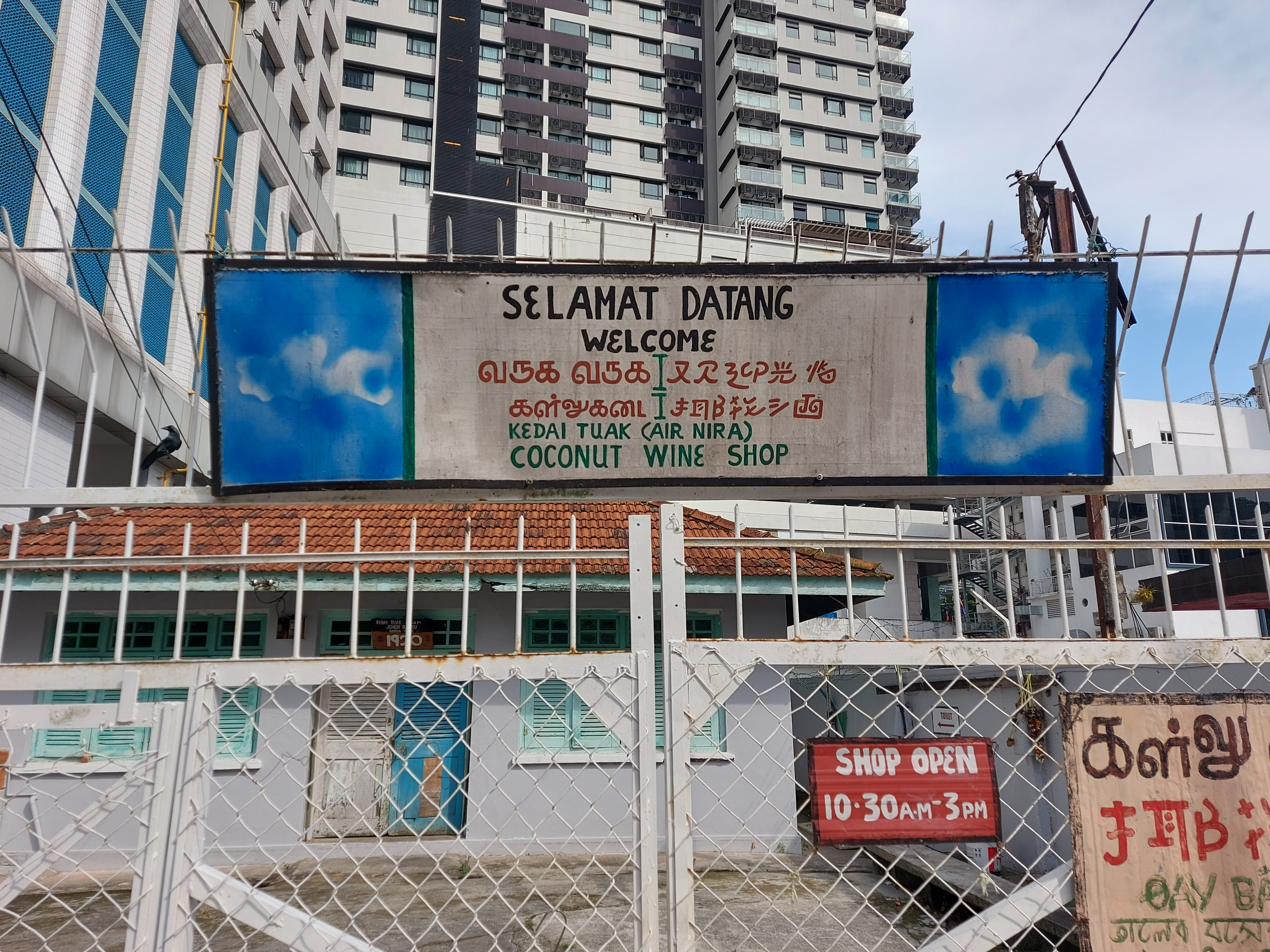
Multilingual sign in Malay, English, Chinese and Tamil at a restaurant in Johor Bahru

The majority of Johoreans are at least bilingual, with Malay as the official language in Johor. Other multilingual speakers may also be fluent in English, Chinese and Tamil languages.

Johorean Malay, also known as Johor-Riau Malay and originally spoken in Johor, Riau, Riau Islands, Malacca, Selangor and Singapore, has been adopted as the basis for both the Malaysian and Indonesian national languages. Due to Johor's location at the confluence of trade routes within Maritime Southeast Asia as well as its history as an influential empire, the dialect has spread as the region's lingua franca since the 15th century; hence the adoption of the dialect as the basis for the national languages of Brunei, Indonesia, Malaysia and Singapore. Several related languages are also spoken in Johor such as Orang Seletar (spoken along the Straits of Johor and in northern Singapore), Orang Kanaq (spoken in small parts of southeastern Johor), Jakun (spoken mostly in inland parts of Johor), Temuan (spoken near the border with Pahang and Negeri Sembilan) and Orang Kuala (spoken along the northwest coast of Johor). Terengganu Malay, a distinct variant of Malay, is spoken in the district of Mersing near the border with Rompin, Pahang.

Different dialect groups of the Chinese language are spoken among the Chinese community in the state, including Hokkien, Teochew, Hakka, Cantonese, Hainanese, Foochow, and Henghua.

The Indian community predominantly speaks Tamil. There is also a significant number of Malayalee populations in parts of Segamat, Johor Bahru and Masai, who speak Malayalam as their mother tongue. Moreover, small number of other Indian language speakers such as the Bengali, Telugu, and Punjabi language speakers are also present. Many Malayalees and Telugus are often categorised as Tamils by the Tamils themselves, and by other groups, as they use the Tamil language as a lingua franca among other Indian communities as in other locations in Peninsular Malaysia.

In 2017, the Queen of Johor, as the royal patron of the Malaysian English Language Teaching Association, called for a more conducive environment for young Malaysians to master English since there has been a drastic decline in proficiency among the younger Malaysian generation.

== Culture ==
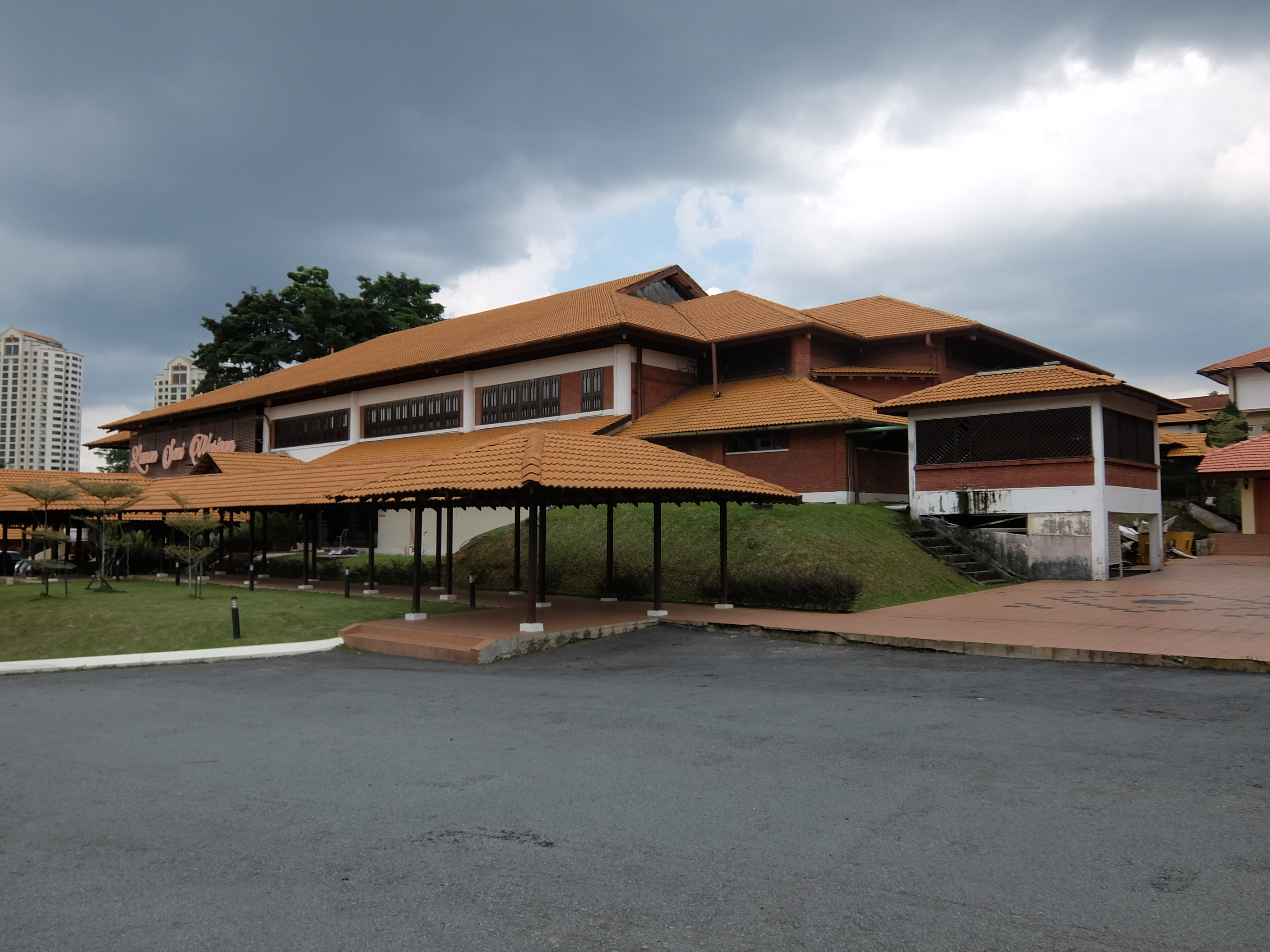
The Johor Heritage Foundation building in the state capital

Johor's culture has been influenced by different ethnicities throughout history, especially by the Arabs, Bugis and Javanese people, with the state also becoming a mixture of different cultures among the Chinese, Indian, Malay and aboriginal people.

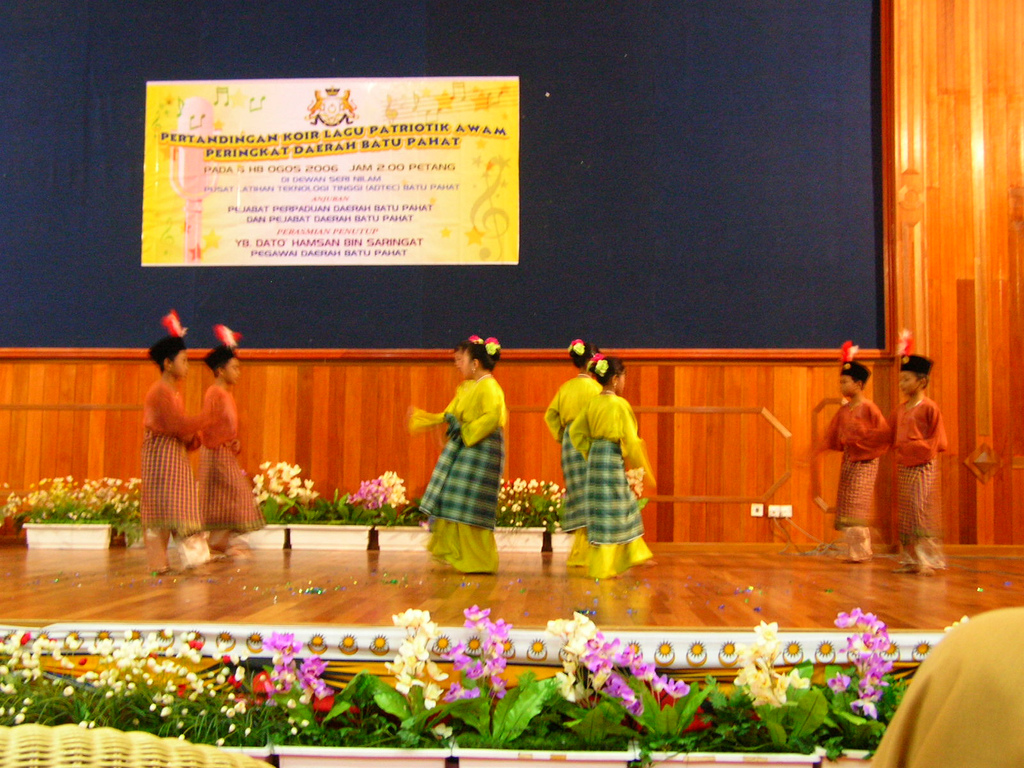
Zapin performance in a school in Batu Pahat

A strong Arab cultural influence is apparent in art performances like zapin, masri and hamdolok and in musical instruments like the gambus. The zapin dance was introduced in the 14th century by Arab Muslim missionaries from Hadhramaut, Yemen, and was originally performed only by male dancers, although female dancers are now common. The dance itself differs among five Johor regions, namely zapin tenglu and zapin pulau (Mersing), zapin lenga (Muar), zapin pekajang (Johor Bahru), zapin koris (Batu Pahat) and zapin parit mustar with zapin seri bunian (Pontian). Another Arab legacy is the use of Arabic names with wadi (valley) for areas populated by the Arab community in the state capital such as "wadi hana" and "wadi hassan".

Buginese and Javanese cultural influences are found in the bosara and kuda kepang dances introduced to Johor before the early 20th century by immigrants of respective communities. The influence of Javanese language on the local Malay dialect is also noticeable from particular vocabulary collected in recorded observations. Indian culture inspired the ghazal. These cultural activities are normally performed at Malay weddings and religious festivals. The aboriginal culture is also unique with a diversity of traditions still practised, such as the making of traditional weapons, medicines, handicrafts and souvenirs.

=== Chingay parade ===
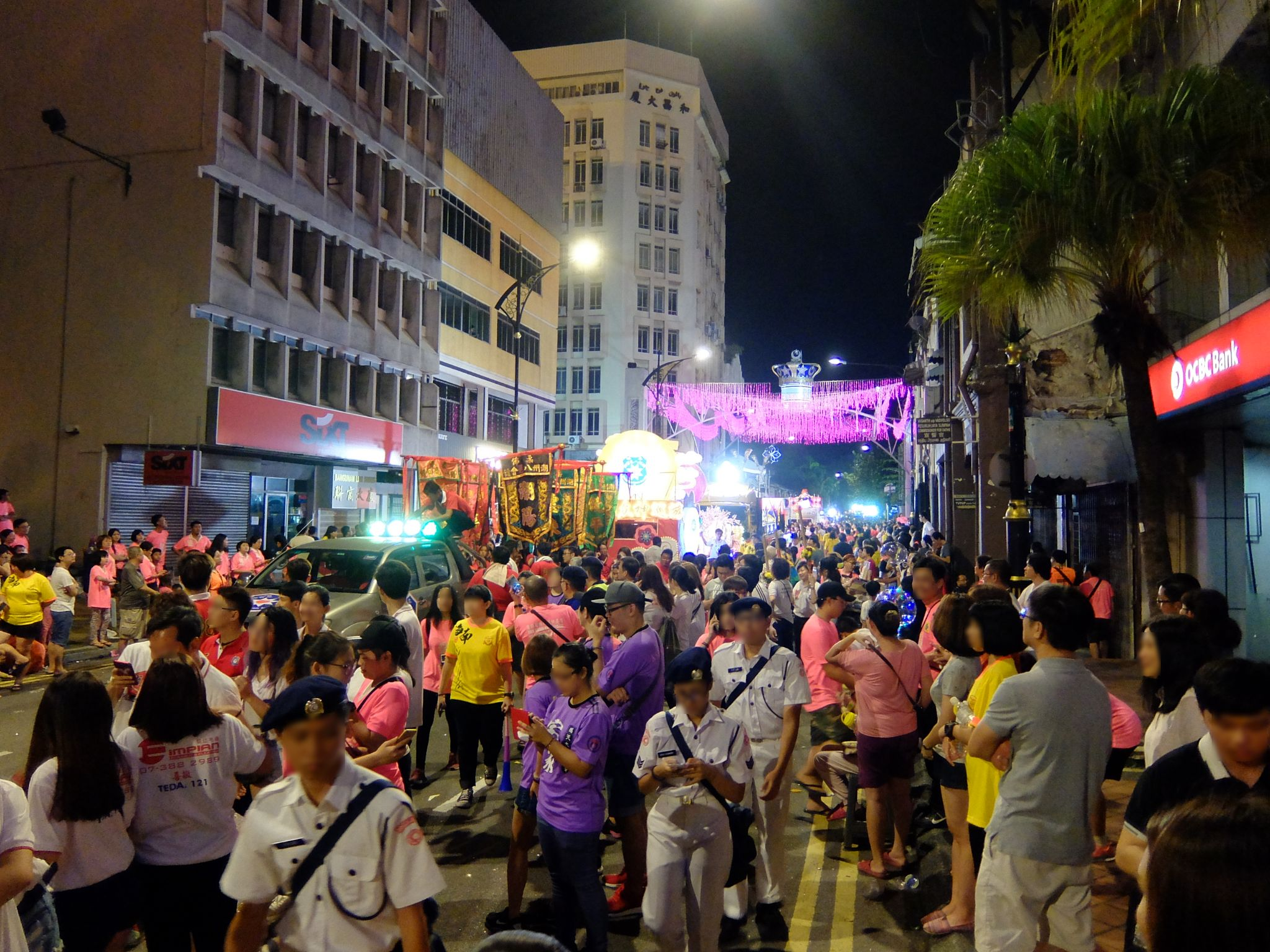
Chingay parade in 2018

The Chinese community holds the Chingay parade annually by the Johor Bahru Old Chinese Temple, which unites the five Chinese ethnic groups in Johor, namely Cantonese, Hainanese, Hakka, Hoklo and Teochew. This co-operation among different Chinese cultures under a voluntary organisation became a symbol of harmony among the different Chinese people that deepens their sense of heritage to preserve their cultural traditions. The Johor Bahru Chinese Heritage Museum describes the history of Chinese migration into Johor from the 14th to 19th centuries during the Ming and Qing dynasties. The ruler of Johor encouraged the Chinese community to plant gambier and pepper in the interior. Many of these farmers switched to pineapple cultivation in the 20th century, making Johor one of Malaysia's top fruit producers.

=== Cuisine ===
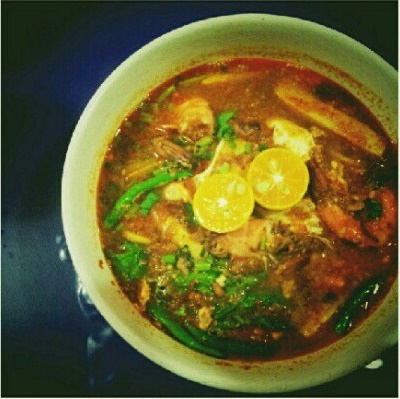
Mee bandung in Johor

Cuisine in Johor has been influenced by Arab, Buginese, Javanese, Malay, Chinese and Indian cultures. Notable dishes include nasi lemak, asam pedas, Nasi Beringin, cathay laksa, cheese murtabak, Johor laksa, kway teow kia, mee bandung, mee rebus, Muar satay, pineapple pajeri, Pontian wonton noodle, san lou fried bee hoon, otak-otak, telur pindang, and other mixed Malay dishes. Popular desserts include burasak, kacang pool, lontong and snacks like banana cake, Kluang toasted buns and pisang goreng. International restaurants offering Western, Filipino, Indonesian, Japanese, Korean, Taiwanese, Thai and Vietnamese cuisines are found throughout the state, especially in Johor Bahru and Iskandar Puteri.

=== Holidays and festivals ===
Johoreans observe a number of holidays and festivals throughout the year including Independence Day, Malaysia Day celebrations and the Sultan of Johor's Birthday.

== Sports ==
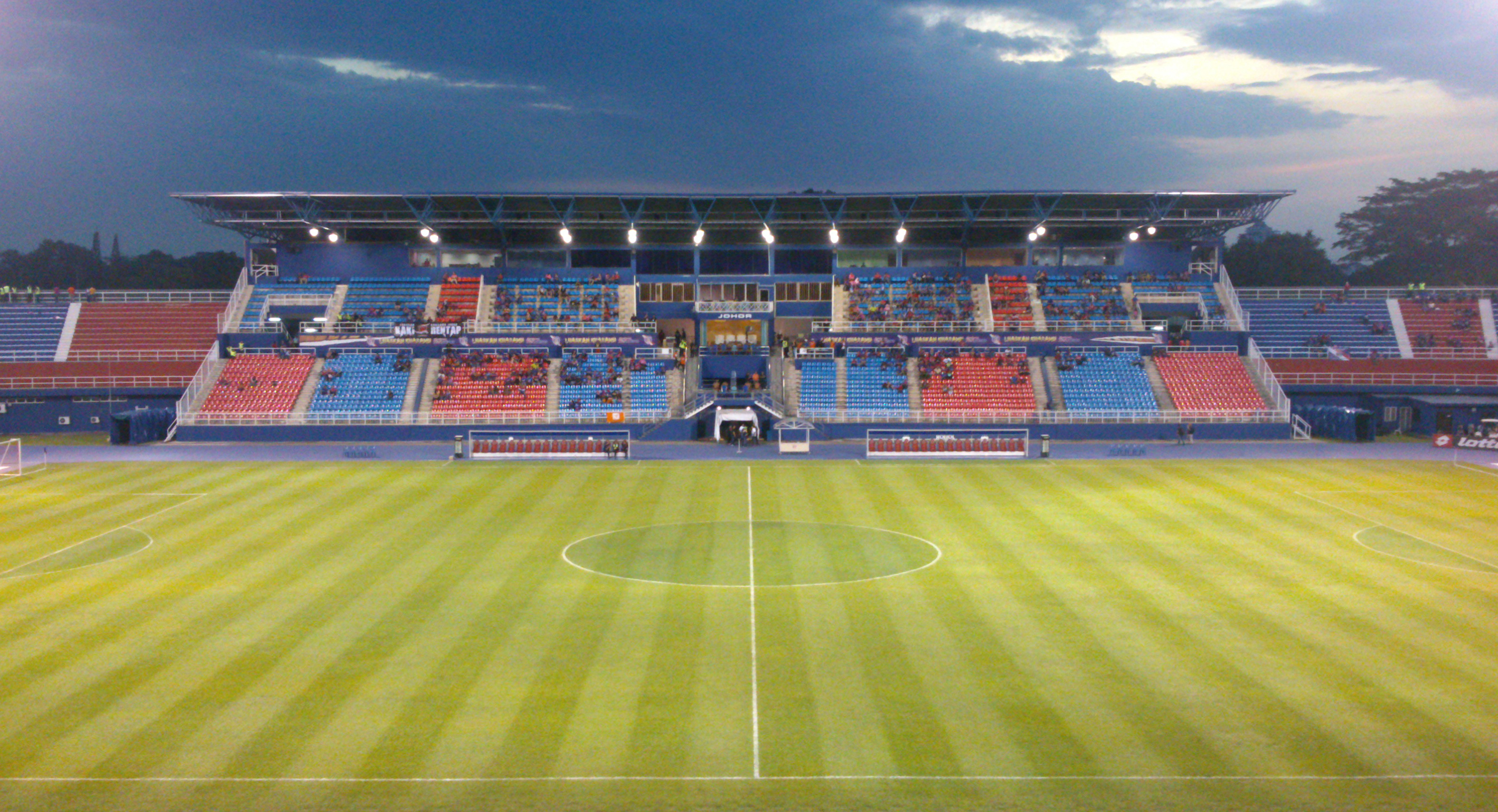
The Tan Sri Dato' Haji Hassan Yunos Stadium, which is still used by Johor Darul Ta'zim II F.C. (JDT II)

As Johor has been part of Malaya since 1957, its athletes represented Malaya and later Malaysia at the Summer Olympic Games, Commonwealth Games, Asian Games and Southeast Asian Games. The Johor State Youth and Sports Department was established in 1957 to raise the standard of sports in the state. Johor hosted the Sukma Games in 1992. There are four sports complexes in the state, and the federal government also provides aid to improve sports facilities. In 2018, as part of a federal government plan to turn Muar into Johor's sports hub, around RM15 million has been allocated to build and upgrade sports facilities in the town.

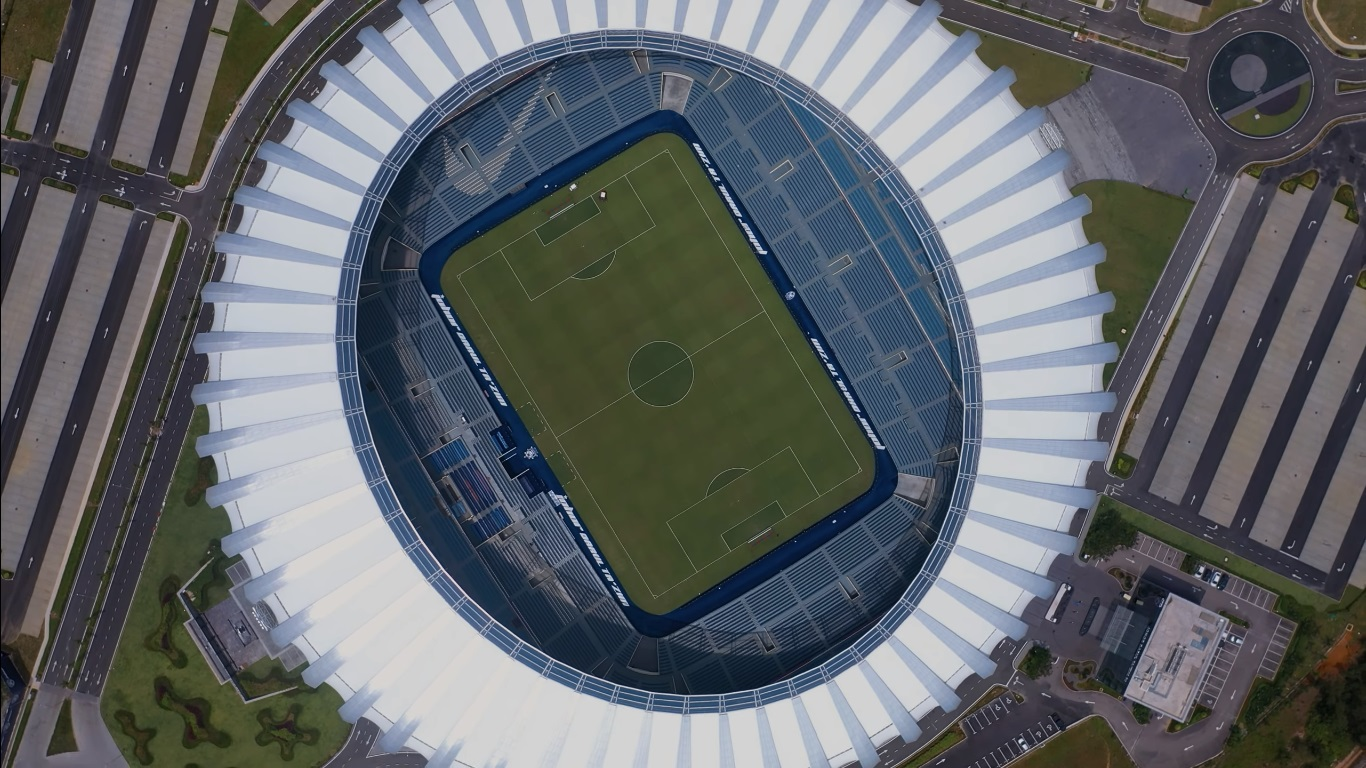
The home stadium of JDT, which is solely owned by the club

Located in Iskandar Puteri, the Sultan Ibrahim Stadium is the main stadium of the football club Johor Darul Ta'zim (JDT). A dominant club in Malaysian club football since the 2010s, they have won the Malaysia Cup six times, the Malaysia FA Cup five times, the Malaysia Super League for twelve consecutive seasons between 2014 and 2026, and the AFC Cup in 2015. The state women's football team also won four titles in the Tun Sharifah Rodziah Cup in 1984, 1986, 1987 and 1989. Another notable stadium in the state is Pasir Gudang Corporation Stadium in Pasir Gudang. Johor also launched its own esports league, becoming the second Malaysian state to introduce the sport to the Sukma Games, with the Johor Sports Council agreeing to include it in the 2020 edition.
