= List of tourist attractions in Johor =

Tourist attractions in Johor, Malaysia

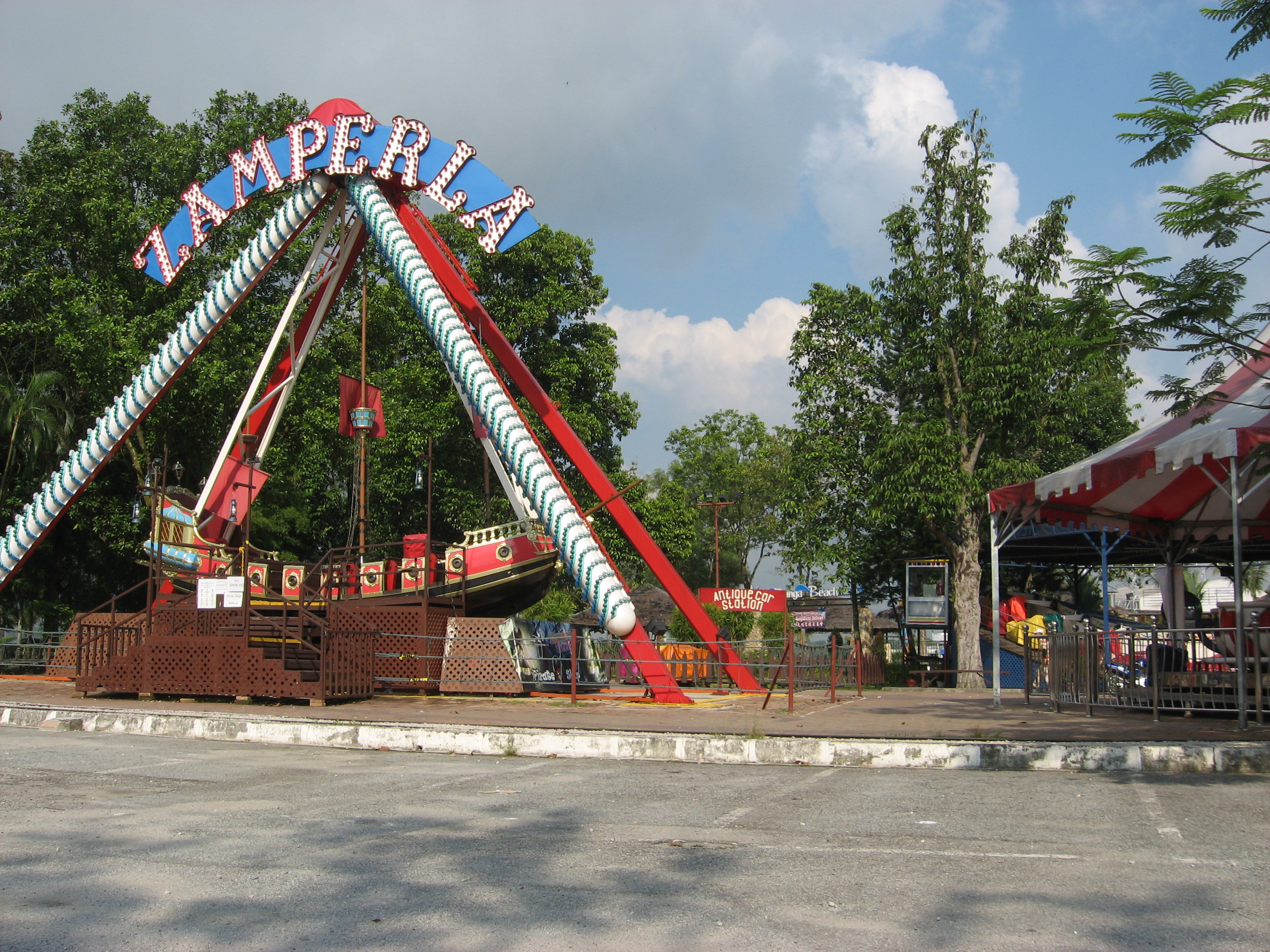
Danga Bay

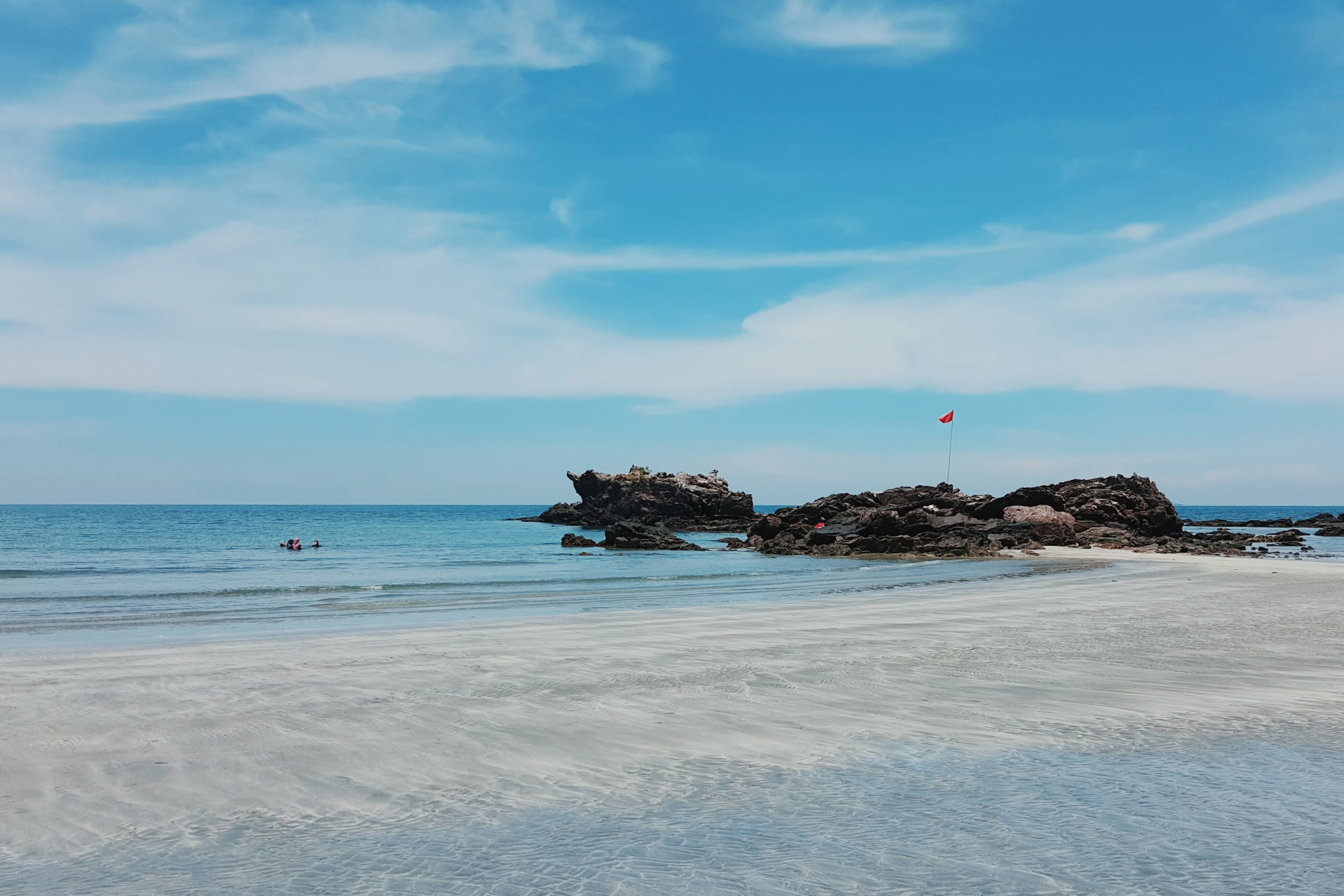
Desaru Beach

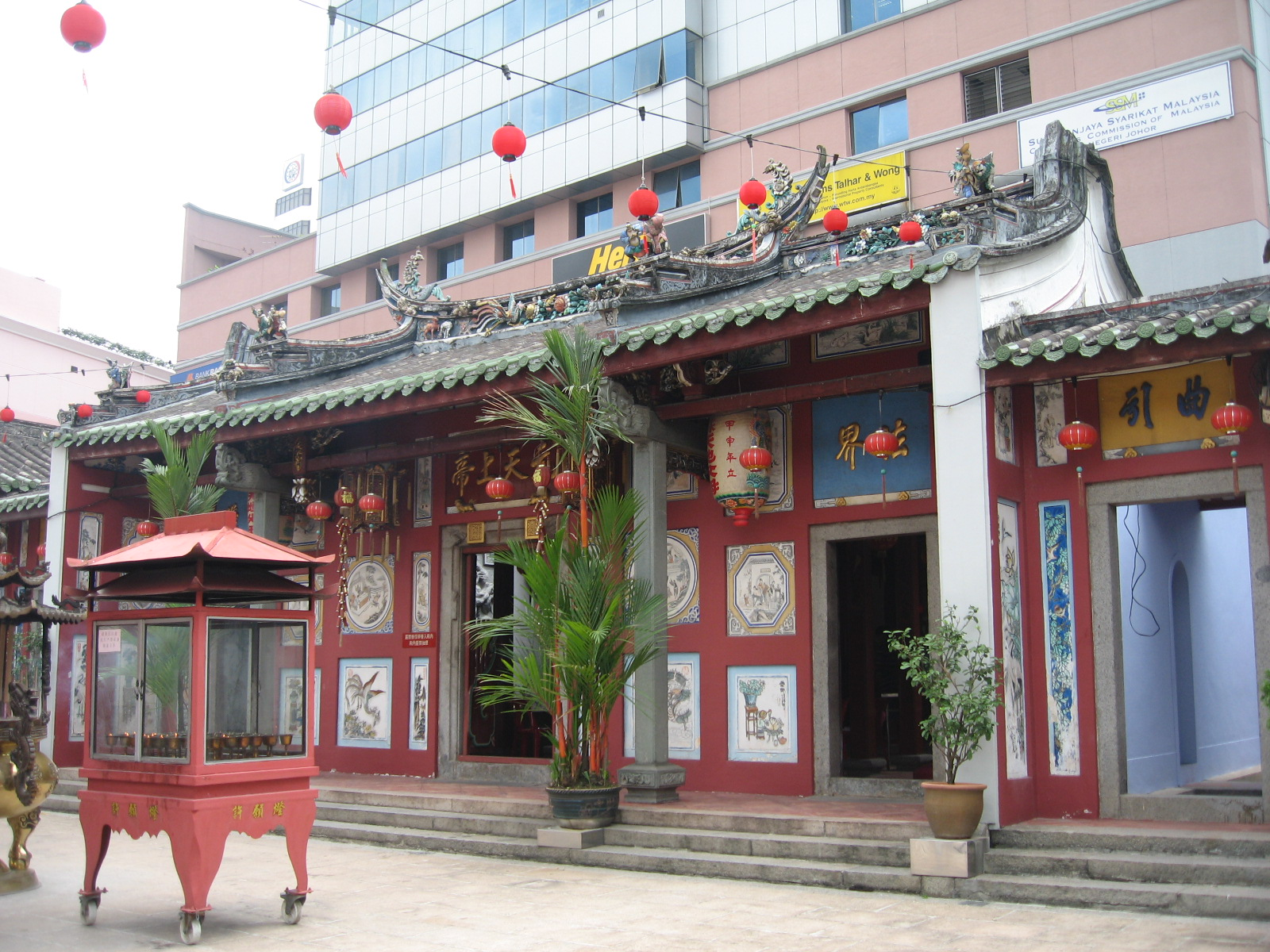
Johor Bahru Old Chinese Temple

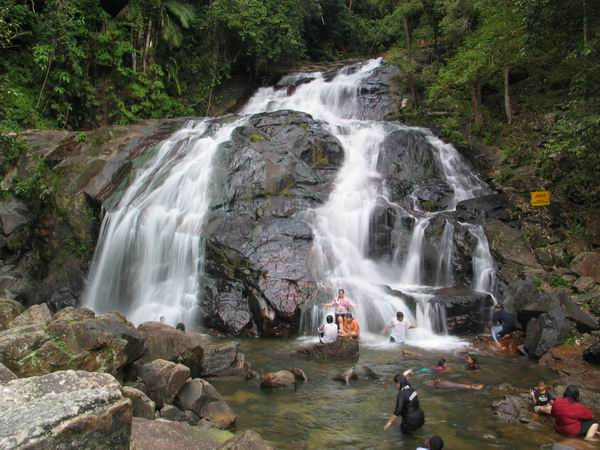
Kota Tinggi Waterfalls

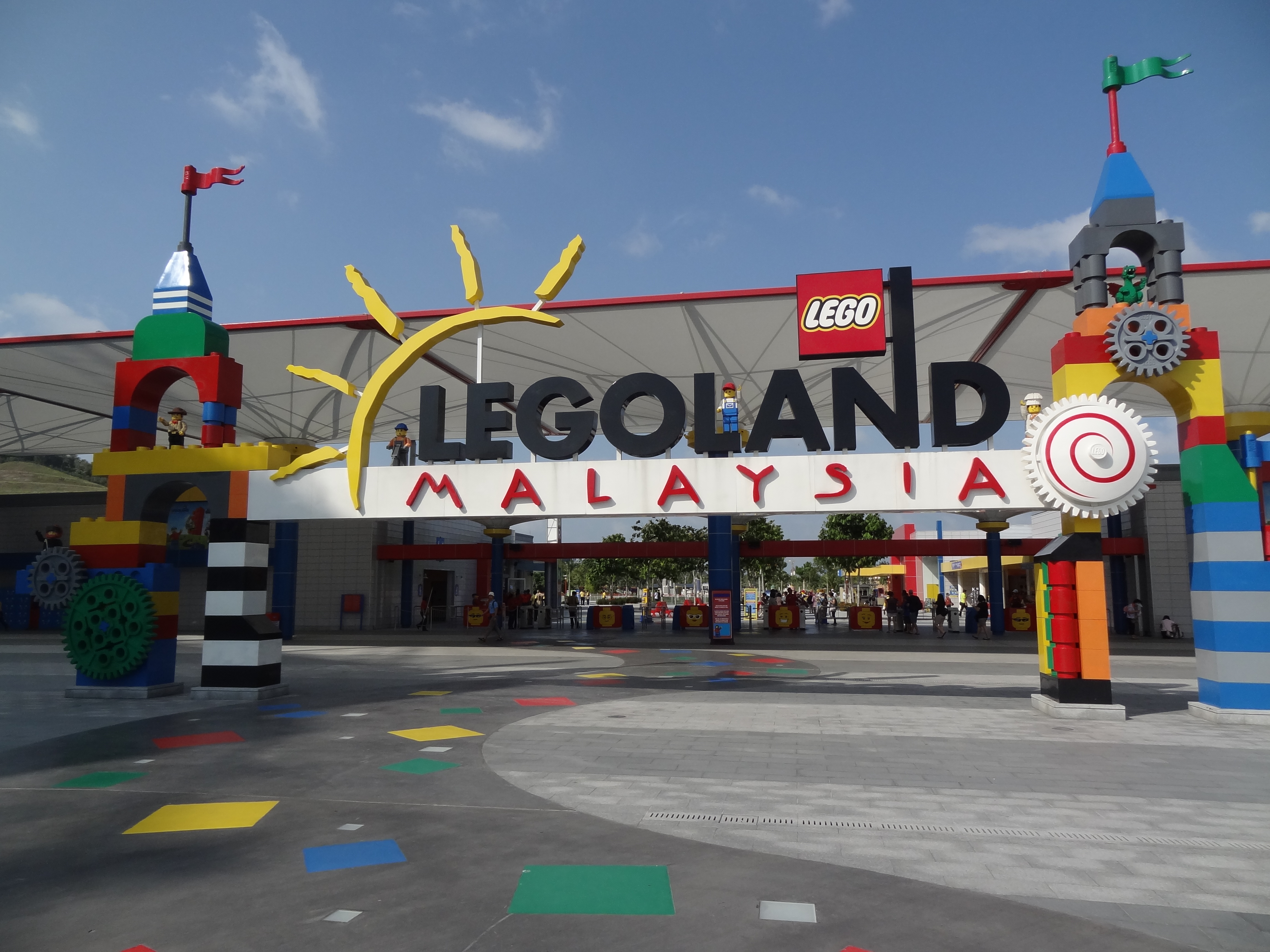
Legoland Malaysia Resort

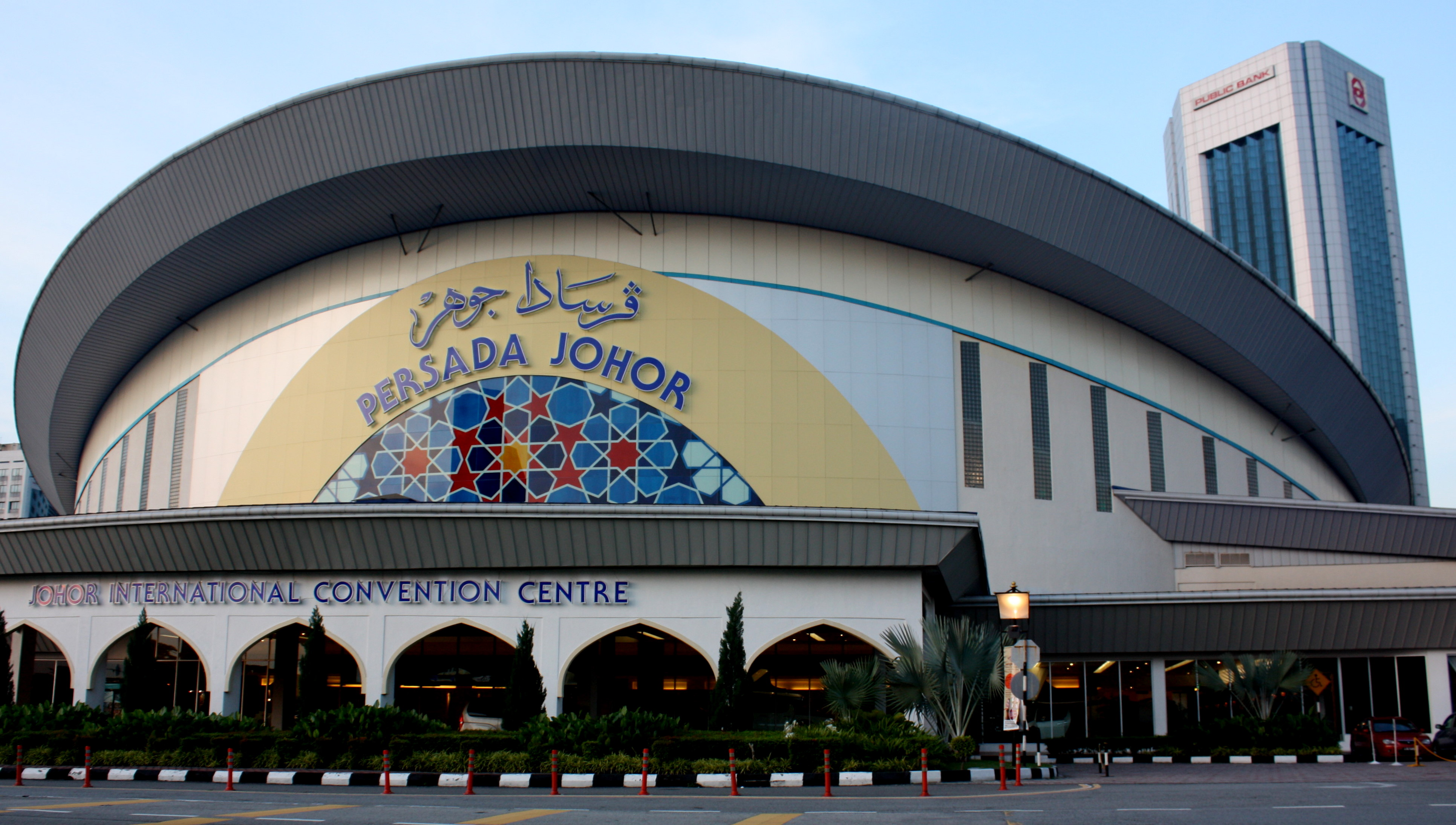
Persada Johor International Convention Center

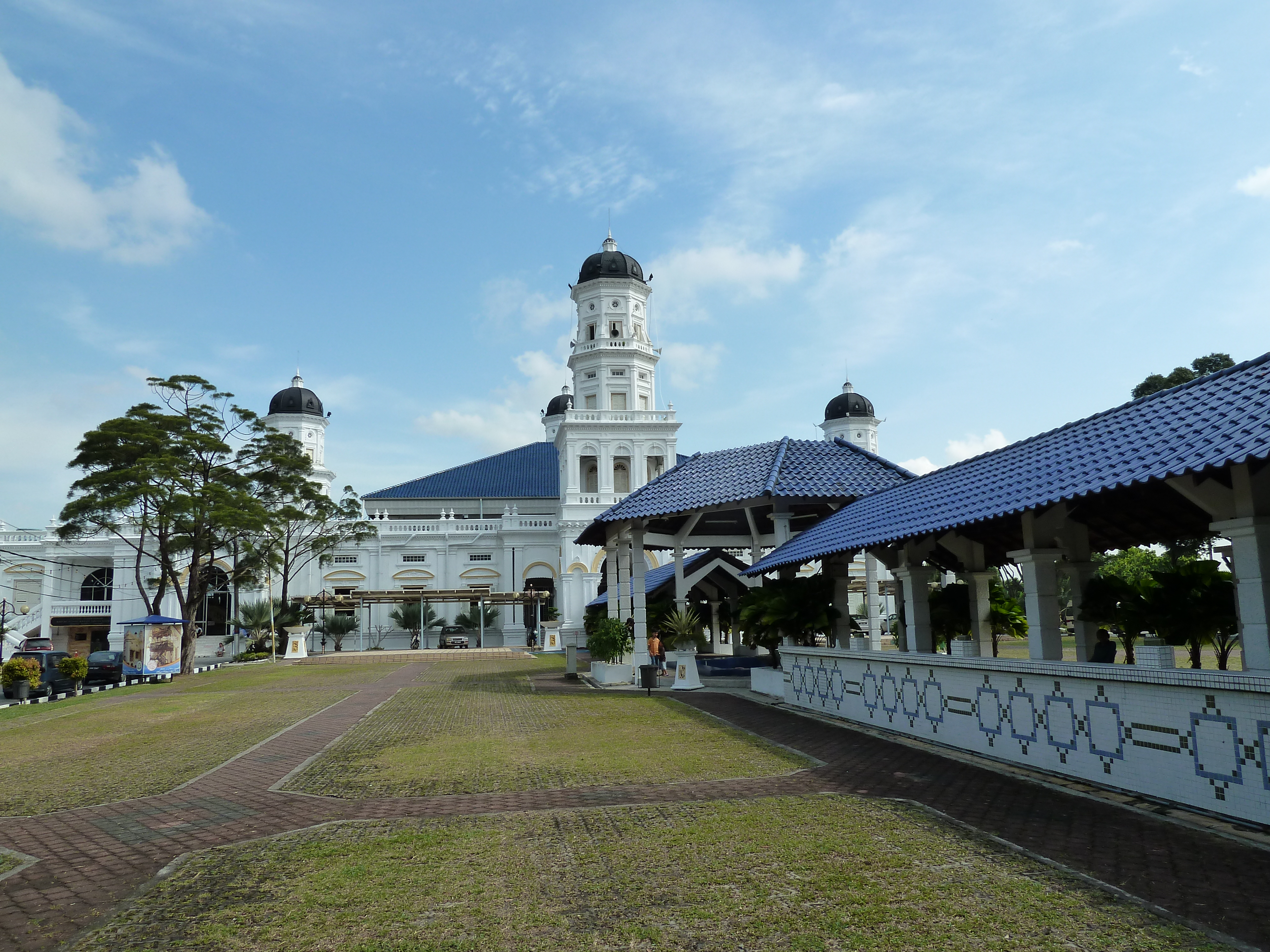
Sultan Abu Bakar State Mosque

This is the list of tourist attractions in Johor, Malaysia.

== Convention centers ==
- Persada Johor International Convention Centre
- Mid Valley Exhibition Centre
- Austin International Conventional Centre
- Taman Daya Convention Centre
- Danga Bay Convention Centre
- Paradigm Mall Convention Centre

== Historical buildings ==
- Johor Bahru Prison
- Sultan Ibrahim Building

== Mausoleums ==
- Mahmoodiah Royal Mausoleum

== Museums ==
- Bugis Museum
- Figure Museum
- Johor Bahru Chinese Heritage Museum
- Kite Museum
- KTM Museum
- Kota Johor Lama Museum
- Kota Tinggi Museum
- Pineapple Museum
- Tanjung Balau Fishermen Museum

== Islands ==
- Aur Island
- Besar Island
- Kukup Island
- Pemanggil Island
- Rawa Island
- Sibu Island

== Mountains and hills ==
- Mount Banang
- Mount Belumut
- Mount Lambak
- Mount Ma'okil
- Mount Ophir
- Mount Pulai
- Mount Ledang
- Mount Muntahak
- Mount Chemendong

== Nature ==
- Endau-Rompin National Park
- Desaru Beach
- Cape Piai
- Kota Tinggi Waterfalls
- Gunung Pulai Waterfalls
- Sungai Gersik Hot Spring

== Public squares ==
- Johor Bahru City Square
- Dataran Penggaram, Batu Pahat
- Dataran Cahaya, Kulai
- Dataran Tasik, Kluang
- Dataran Kota Tinggi
- Dataran Labis
- Dataran Segamat, Segamat
- Dataran Tangkak
- Dataran Gemilang, Yong Peng

== Religious places ==
=== Buddhist temples ===
- Ching Giap See Temple (净业寺), in Muar
- Santi Forest Monastery, in Johor Bahru (Ulu Tiram)

=== Chinese temples ===
- Johor Bahru Old Chinese Temple, in Johor Bahru
- Sam Siang Keng (三善宫), in Johor Bahru
- Nan Ting Si Temple (南亭寺), in Muar

=== Church ===
- Cathedral of the Sacred Heart of Jesus, Johor Bahru
- Church of the Immaculate Conception, Johor Bahru
- Church of the Immaculate Heart of Mary, Pontian
- Skudai Catholic Center

=== Hindu temples ===
- Arulmigu Sri Rajakaliamman Glass Temple

=== Mosques ===
- An-Nur Kota Raya Mosque
- Bandar Baru UDA Jamek Mosque
- Nong Chik Jamek Mosque
- Pasir Gudang Jamek Mosque
- Pasir Pelangi Royal Mosque
- Senai Airport Mosque
- Sultan Abu Bakar State Mosque
- Sultan Ismail Jamek Mosque
- Tan Sri Ainuddin Wahid Mosque
- Tun Hussein Onn Jamek Mosque
- Ungku Tun Aminah Mosque

== Sport centers ==
- Sultan Ibrahim Stadium
- Johor Circuit
- Pasir Gudang Corporation Stadium
- Taman Daya Hockey Stadium
- Tan Sri Dato' Haji Hassan Yunos Stadium
- Laman Xtreme Pasir Gudang

== Shopping centers ==
- ÆON Bukit Indah Shopping Centre
- ÆON Tebrau City Shopping Centre
- ÆON Bandar Dato Onn Shopping Centre
- ÆON Permas Jaya Shopping Centre
- ÆON Mall Kulaijaya
- Angsana Johor Bahru Mall
- Batu Pahat Mall
- Beletime Danga Bay
- Galleria@Kotaraya
- Johor Bahru City Square
- Johor Premium Outlets
- Komtar JBCC
- KSL City
- IKEA Tebrau
- Paradigm Mall Johor Bahru
- Plaza Pelangi
- R&F Mall
- Sunway Big Box
- The Mall, Mid Valley Southkey
- Toppen Shopping Centre
- SKS City Mall JBCC
- Larkin Junction

== Theme parks and resorts ==
- Danga Bay
- Legoland Malaysia Resort
- Tropical Village
- Austin Heights Water & Adventure Park
- Adventure Waterpark Desaru Coast
- Skyscape Johor Bahru

== See also ==
- List of tourist attractions in Malaysia
