= Protected areas of Johor =

The state of Johor in Malaysia is noted for its national parks and forest reserves which preserve virgin rainforests known for its biodiversity and endangered species of animals. Mangrove swamps and coral reefs are also protected within these parks.

== National parks ==
=== Endau Rompin National Park ===
Endau Rompin National Park is located on the Johor-Pahang border (2.438915°N 103.272858°E). The park takes its name from the Endau and Rompin rivers that flow through the park. It is the second largest national park in Peninsular Malaysia after Taman Negara, covering 489 km^{2} with approximately 26 km of jungle trails within the park. The most famous trail is a 16 km trail that starts at Kuala Jasin and ends at Batu Hampar. Other sites of interest in the park are Opeh Guling waterfall, Buaya Sangkut waterfall and salt licks around Gunung Tiong. There are two entry points to the park with one at Kampung Peta and the other at Nitar. There are two other rivers, Selai and Jasin rivers, that flows through the park. It is home to several of the country's fauna such as the Malayan tiger, Malayan tapir and Asian elephant.

=== Mount Ledang National Park ===
Mount Ledang National Park is situated 170 km north of Johor Bahru and covers an area of 107 km^{2} (2.341496°N 102.573853°E). The park has two entry points, one in Sagil on the Johorean side, and the other in Asahan, Melaka. Ledang's peak, which is 1,276 m (4,186 ft) above sea level, is the centrepiece of the park, and is the highest point in Johor. Mount Ledang is also the 64th highest mountain in Malaysia and arguably the most climbed mountain in the country. Sagil waterfall, which is also in the park is a famous picnic site.

=== Tanjung Piai National Park ===
Tanjung Piai National Park is situated on the southernmost tip of mainland Asia (1.267530°N 103.510265°E). Its name is derived from an indigenous wild fern, piai raya (Acrostichum aureum) and piai iasa (Acrostichum speciosum). It is famous as a feeding ground for migratory birds like the sandpiper, Eurasian whimbrel, common redshank, greenshank and grey plover. It has also been gazetted as a Ramsar site. Besides migratory birds, it is also a haven for mangrove crabs, mudskippers and crab-eating macaques.

=== Pulau Kukup National Park ===
Pulau Kukup National Park comprises 15 km^{2} of mangrove and mudflats. It is situated close to Tanjong Piai National Park (1.319616°N 103.427353°E).

=== Sultan Iskandar Marine Park ===
The Sultan Iskandar Marine Park consists of 13 South China Sea islands off the east coast of mainland Johor (2.295528°N 104.116058°E). The islands are Pulau Harimau, Pulau Mensirip, Pulau Goal, Pulau Besar, Pulau Tengah, Pulau Hujong, Pulau Rawa, Pulau Tinggi, Pulau Mentinggi, Pulau Sibu, Pulau Sibu Hujung, Pulau Pemanggil and Pulau Aur. These islands are situated south of the more famous Pulau Tioman in Pahang.

== Reserves ==
=== Gunung Pulai Recreational Forest ===
Gunung Pulai Recreational Forest is one of the smaller parks with an area of 80 square kilometres. It is a catchment area and the closest forest reserve to Johor Bahru. A popular attraction is Pulai waterfall. (1.580457°N 103.546143°E)

=== Gunung Arong Recreational Forest ===
Gunong Arong (274 meters) is the main feature of this park. It is 17 km from Mersing and 22 km from Endau. It also has a Forestry Museum on site. (2.562222°N 103.807497°E)

=== Gunung Lambak Recreational Forest ===
It is a recreational forest near Kluang. The main feature of the park is Gunung Lambak (510 m).(1.985381°N 103.359375°E)

=== Gunung Belumut (Moss Mountain) Recreational Forest ===
Gunung Belumut (Moss Mountain) Recreational Forest (2.029643°N 103.539619°E) is based around the mountain, from which it gets its name. It is situated 32 km from Kluang. Gunung Belumut (1010m) has a 6 km path to the mountain's peak, which takes approximately four hours to reach. The park also has a unique rock formation, called Crown Rock (Batu Mahkota), which looks like a giant crown.

=== Gunung Panti Recreational Forest ===
It is noted for its wild orchids and birds. Besides that, the southernmost mountain in Peninsular Malaysia is also in this park. (1.848129°N 103.852386°E)

=== Sungai Sedili Besar and Sungai Sedili Kecil Wetland Preservation ===
It is another wetland area for the protection of migratory birds. This freshwater mangrove swamp has an area of 1.5 km^{2}.

=== Sungai Lebam Wetland Preservation ===
Sungai Lebam is a vast mangrove swamp where clams and fireflies are conserved. Fireflies congregate at the Berembang trees in the swamp. This wetland is near Kota Tinggi and approximately 91 km from Johor Bahru.
