= National Parks Act 1980 =

National Parks Act 1980 may refer to:

- National Parks Act 1980 (Malaysia)
- National Parks Act 1980 (New Zealand)
