= Dayang =

Dayang may refer to:

- Dayang (honorific), a Bruneian honorific
- a dialect of Sema language, a Sino-Tibetan language
- Dayang Jingxuan, a Buddhist monk during the Song dynasty of China
- Dayang Island, an island in Johor, Malaysia
- Dayang newt, a species of Salamander
- Dayang Motorcycle, a division of Dayun Group
- Dayang, the indigenous name of the heath mouse
