= Johor Art Gallery =

Former gallery in Johor Bahru, Johor, Malaysia

Coordinates: 1°27′59.7″N 103°44′50.8″E

- Galeri Seni Johor
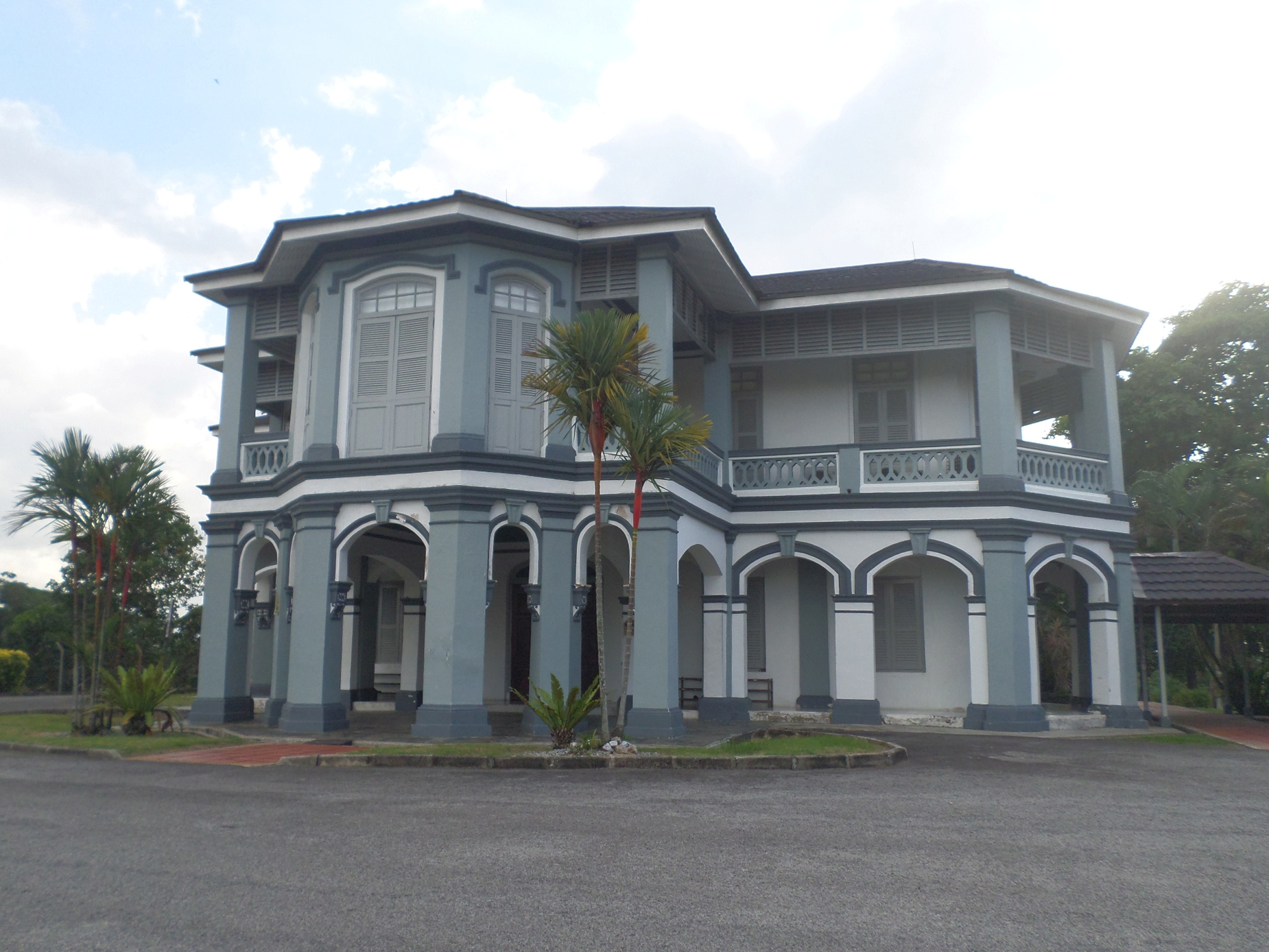
- Interactive map of the Johor Art Gallery area

General information
- Type: art gallery
- Location: Johor Bahru, Johor, Malaysia
- Completed: 1910
- Opening: 29 January 1994

The Johor Art Gallery (Malay: Galeri Seni Johor) is an art gallery in Johor Bahru, Johor, Malaysia.

== History ==
The building was originally constructed in 1910. It once became the official residence of Johor Chief Minister Abdullah Jaafar. During the Japanese occupation of Malaya, at one time the building became the base for the Japanese Imperial Army. Afterwards, the Johor State Government decided to preserve the building by transforming it into an art gallery and named it Johor Art Gallery. The art gallery was opened on 29 January 1994 by Chief Minister Muhyiddin Yassin. In 2000–2003, it was closed for renovation and reopened again on 6 May 2003 by Chief Minister Abdul Ghani Othman. The building is now closed and appears abandoned.

== Architecture ==
The art gallery is a 2-story building located on top of a small green hill.

== Exhibitions ==
After its opening in 1994, the gallery used to display historical artifacts on arts and cultures of Johor. After its reopening in 2003, it became the center for arts and cultures. The exhibition area is divided into the permanent and temporary exhibition areas. Besides temporary exhibitions, the art gallery also regularly holds various competitions.

== See also ==
- List of tourist attractions in Johor
