= Mersing River =

River of Johor, Malaysia

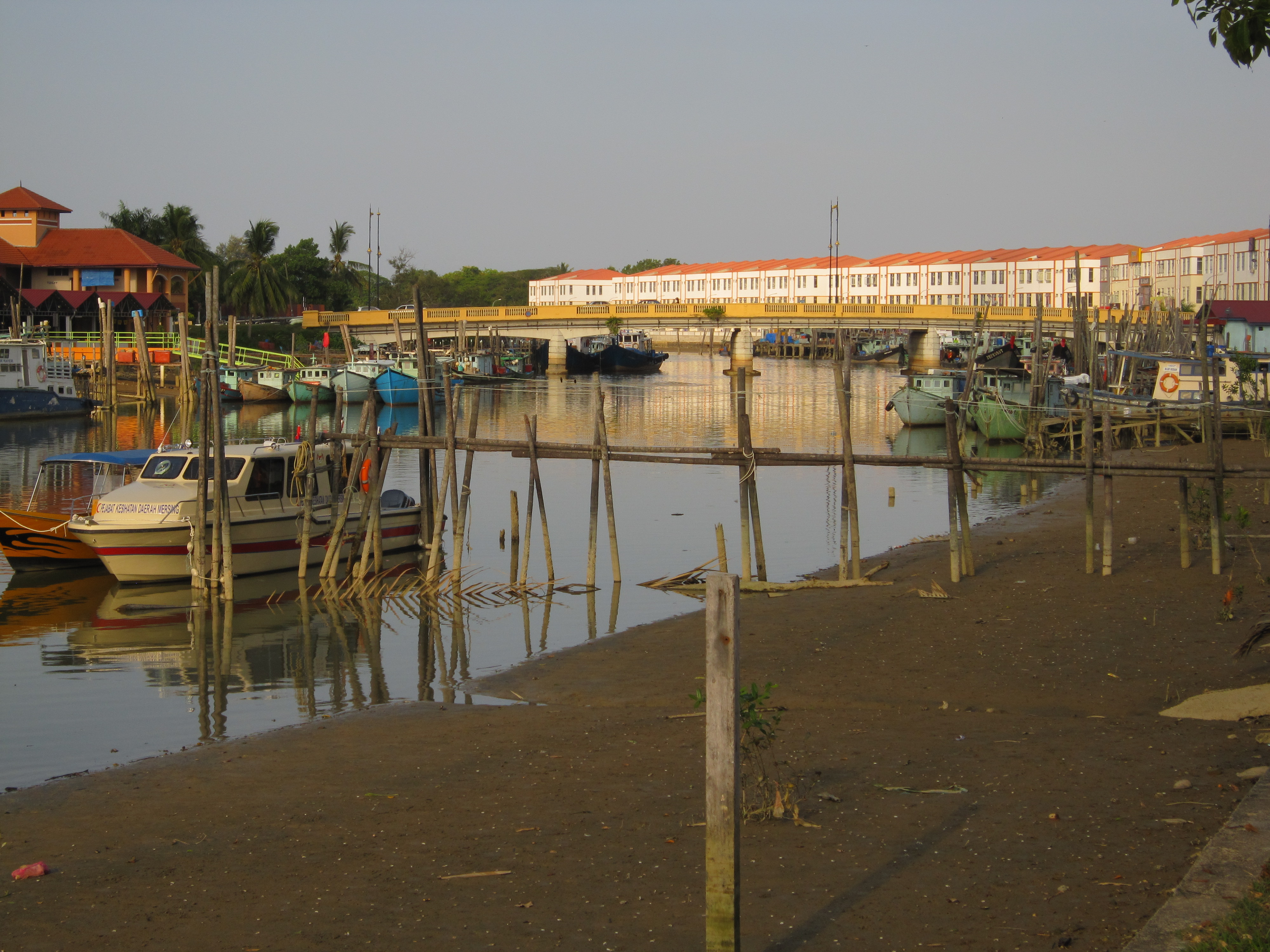
- Mersing River at Mersing town
- Native name: Sungai Mersing (Malay)

Location
- Country: Malaysia

Physical characteristics
- Mouth
  - location: South China Sea near Mersing, Mersing District
  - coordinates: 2°26′9″N 103°50′25″E
  - elevation: 0 m (0 ft)
- Basin size: 270 km^{2} (100 sq mi)

The Mersing River (Malay: Sungai Mersing) is a river in the state of Johor, Malaysia. It flows from south to north with a catchment of 270 km². The river's mouth is in Mersing and it empties into the South China Sea.
