= WMAU =

WMAU may refer to:

- Wikimedia Australia
- WMAU-FM, a radio station (88.9 FM) licensed to Bude, Mississippi, United States
- WMAU-TV, a television station (channel 17) licensed to Bude, Mississippi, United States
- Mersing Airport in Mersing, Johor
