= Dayang Island =

Island in Mersing District, Johor, Malaysia

Native name: Pulau Dayang
- Interactive map of Dayang Island

Geography
- Location: South China Sea
- Coordinates: 2°28′28″N 104°30′10″E
- Archipelago: Aur Islands
- Area: 1.31 km^{2} (0.51 sq mi)

Administration
- Malaysia
- State: Johor
- District: Mersing
- Mukim: Aur Islands

Additional information
- Time zone: MST (UTC+08:00)
- Postal code: 86800

Dayang Island (Malay: Pulau Dayang) is an island in Mersing District, Johor, Malaysia. It is one of the three islands of the Aur Island chain. The name of the neighbouring island, Aur Island, means "bamboo island" in Malay and both islands have been known to Chinese sailors for centuries. A map from the 17th century identified them as East and West Bamboo islands.

This is a small island with two resorts. Being the furthest island in West Malaysia, it takes three to four hours by charter boat from Mersing town. Dayang and Aur islands can be visited from March to November. Travel from December to February is not recommended, when the sea is controlled by the northeast monsoon and navigation from the main coast of Malaysia is generally closed.

== See also ==
- List of islands of Malaysia
