= Aur Island bent-toed gecko =

Scientific classification
- Kingdom: Animalia
- Phylum: Chordata
- Class: Reptilia
- Order: Squamata
- Suborder: Gekkota
- Family: Gekkonidae
- Genus: Cyrtodactylus
- Species: C. aurensis

Binomial name
- Cyrtodactylus aurensis Grismer, 2005

Species of lizard

The Aur Island bent-toed gecko (Cyrtodactylus aurensis) is a species of gecko endemic to Aur Island in Malaysia.
