= Kampung Peta =

Village in Mersing, Johor, Malaysia

Coordinates: 2°32′N 103°25′E

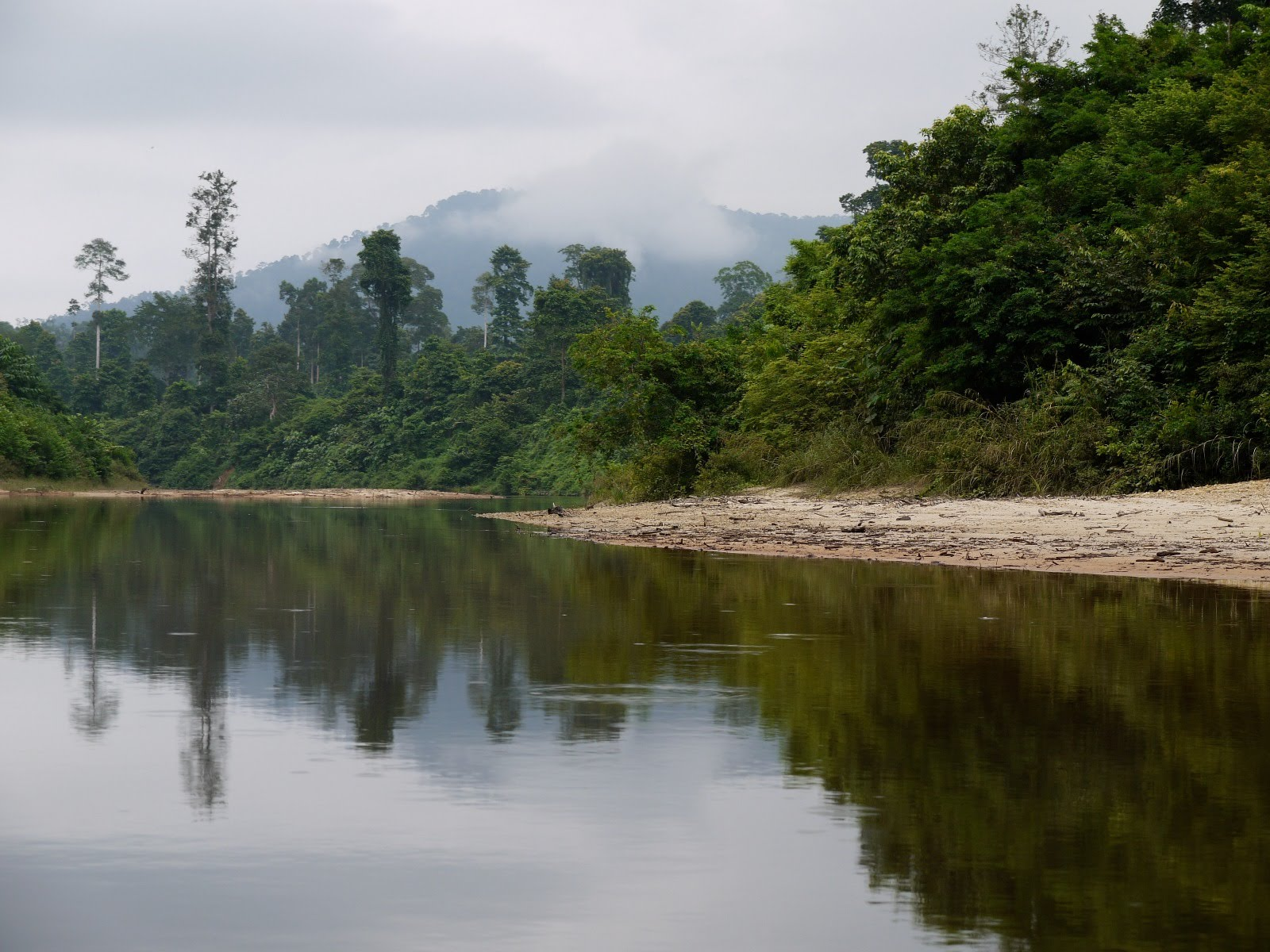
The Endau river at Kampung Peta

Kampung Peta is a Malaysian village in the upper Endau valley along the Endau River in Mersing District, Johor state. The inhabitants of Kampung Peta are mainly Orang Asli (indigenous people) from the Jakun people ethnic group.

== Etymology ==
The word Peta means "map" in Malay.

== Tourism ==
The park gate of Endau-Rompin National Park is situated at Kampung Peta. There are several self-catering accommodation options in the park as well as a park lodge situated at the park gate. Within the village there is a basic self catering home that can be rented. The village runs a small self catering campsite a few kilometres from the village.

A jetty at the village is the starting point from which short boat trips can be made upstream to the confluence of the Jasin and Endau rivers, or for fishing trips downstream.

Attractions found near Kampung Peta include walks in the tropical rainforest, wildlife, jungle trekking and the river views along the Endau River. Asian Elephants sometimes visit the village and the surrounding areas in the evenings to feed.

== Transportation ==
Local tour operators arrange transportation from Kahang or Kluang to the entrance of Endau-Rompin Park at Kampung Peta. Entrance permits and park tours are often included in the package.

Kluang can be easily reached from Singapore or Johor Bahru as well as from Kuala Lumpur by bus or train with the KTM West Coast railway line to Kluang railway station.
