= Cnemaspis baueri =

Conservation status
- Least Concern (IUCN 3.1)

Scientific classification
- Kingdom: Animalia
- Phylum: Chordata
- Class: Reptilia
- Order: Squamata
- Suborder: Gekkota
- Family: Gekkonidae
- Genus: Cnemaspis
- Species: C. baueri

Binomial name
- Cnemaspis baueri Das & Grismer, 2003

Species of lizard

Cnemaspis baueri, also known commonly as Bauer's rock gecko or the Pulau Aur rock gecko, is a species of lizard in the family Gekkonidae. The species is endemic to Malaysia.

== Etymology ==
The specific name, baueri, is in honor of American herpetologist Aaron Matthew Bauer.

== Geographic range ==
C. baueri is found on Aur Island, Johor, Malaysia.

== Habitat ==
The preferred natural habitat of C. baueri is granite boulders in forest at altitudes of about 50 m (160 ft).

== Description ==
C. baueri may attain a snout-to-vent length (SVL) of 6.7 cm (2.6 in).

== Reproduction ==
C. baueri is oviparous. Clutch size is two eggs per adult female. Eggs are laid in communal sites which may contain up to 250 eggs.
