= Pemanggil Island =

Island in Mersing District, Johor, Malaysia

Native name: Pulau Pemanggil
- Interactive map of Pemanggil Island

Geography
- Location: South China Sea
- Coordinates: 2°34′52″N 104°19′37″E
- Area: 8.82 km^{2} (3.41 sq mi)
- Highest elevation: 223 m (732 ft)

Administration
- Malaysia
- State: Johor
- District: Mersing
- Mukim: Pemanggil Island

Demographics
- Population: 34 (2020)
- Pop. density: 3.996/km^{2} (10.35/sq mi)
- Languages: Malaysian Malay, Johor-Riau Malay
- Ethnic groups: Malays

Additional information
- Time zone: MST (UTC+8)
- Postal Code: 86800

Pemanggil Island (Malay: Pulau Pemanggil) is an island in Mersing District, Johor, Malaysia.

== Geography ==
The island sits 45 km east of Mersing mainland.

Pemanggil Island is known for deep-sea fishing and good hunting grounds for marlins and mackerels. It has also hill at the outcrop of the island. On the north-eastern coast of the island is Teluk Lancang, an isolated bay. At the center of the island lies a huge boulder known locally as Batu Buau which locals regard as sacred.

== Transportation ==
The island is accessible by boat from Mersing Town.

== See also ==
- List of islands of Malaysia
