= Persada Johor International Convention Centre =

Persada Johor International Convention Centre Pusat Konvensyen Antarabangsa Persada Johor
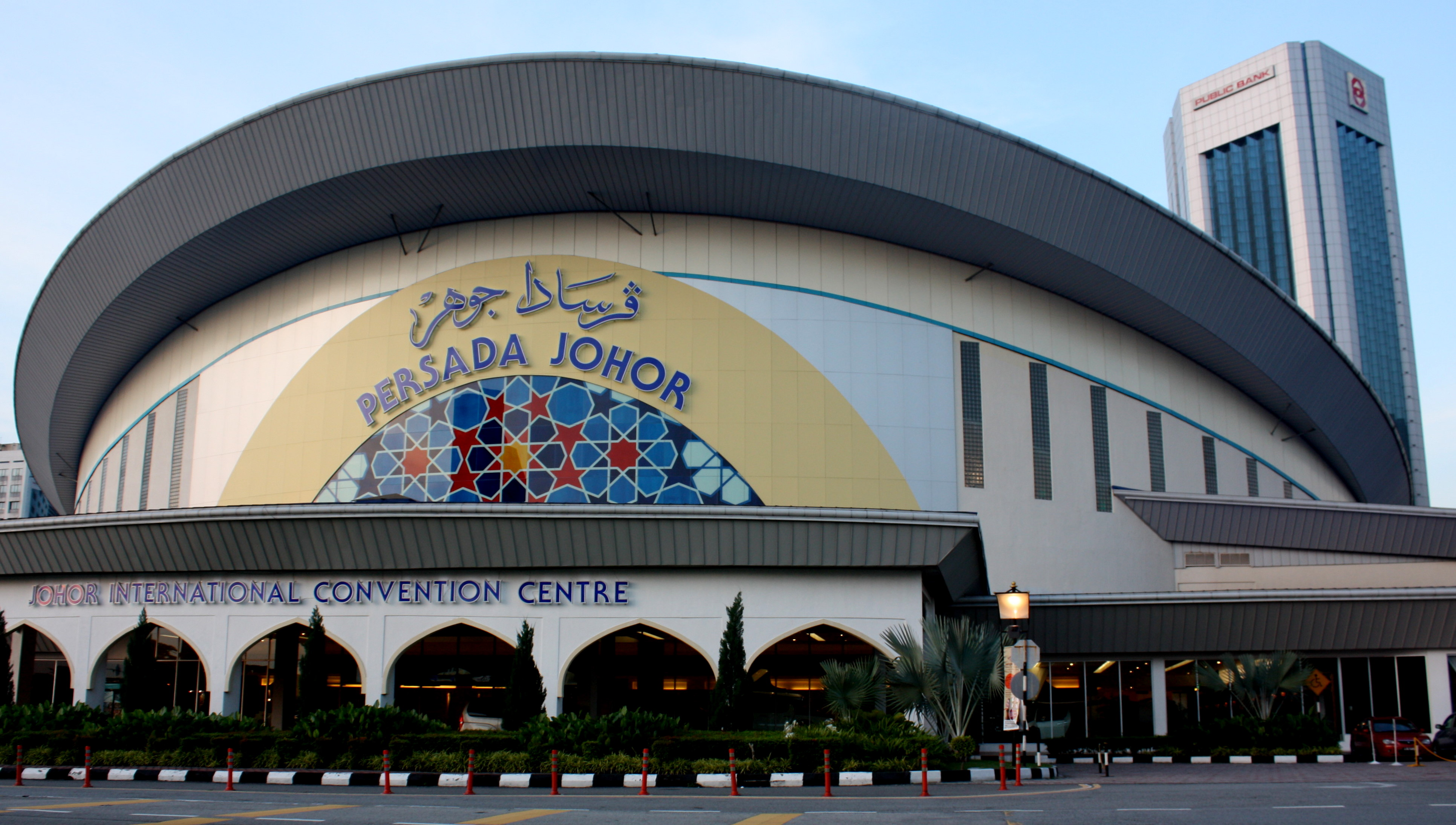
- Interactive map of Persada Johor International Convention Centre; Pusat Konvensyen Antarabangsa Persada Johor
- Location: Johor Bahru, Johor, Malaysia
- Coordinates: 1.461833°N 103.761583°E
- Owner: Johor Corporation

Construction
- Opened: 2006
- Closed: 31 August 2026; 44 days ago

Website
- persadajohor.com

The Persada Johor International Convention Centre (Malay: Pusat Konvensyen Antarabangsa Persada Johor) is a convention center in Johor Bahru, Johor, Malaysia. It is a member of the Johor Corporation Group of Companies. Pesada Johor was closed on 31 August 2026 and demolished in September 2026 to make way for IIBD development.

== Name ==
Persada is taken from Malay language which means a place which has steps for a royal member to sit and conduct official matters.

== History ==
The area where the convention center stands today used to be the site for Johor Military Force (JMF) camp and early remnants of Johor Bahru.

== Architecture ==
The convention center area spreads over an area of 2.43 hectares, with the building covers an area of 1.69 hectares. The building was designed with a roof that resembles the official hat of Johor Sultanate. The convention center consists of convention halls, meeting rooms, exhibition halls, auditorium and restaurant.

== Transportation ==
The convention center is accessible by Muafakat Bus route P-101.

== See also ==
- List of tourist attractions in Johor
