= Endau-Rompin National Park =

National park in Malaysia

Coordinates: 2.438915°N 103.272858°E

- Taman Negara Endau-Rompin
- IUCN category II (national park)
- View from the top of Janing Barat.
- Location: Johor and Pahang, Peninsular Malaysia
- Nearest city: Kahang
- Area: 870 km^{2} (340 sq mi)
- Established: 1993
- Governing body: Johor Park Corporation

Endau-Rompin National Park (Malay: Taman Negara Endau-Rompin) is a protected tropical rainforest situated within a massif in the southern foothills of the Tenasserim Hills, straddling Segamat and Mersing Districts in northeastern Johor and Rompin District in southern Pahang. It covers a total land area of approximately 870 km^{2} (340 sq mi), making it the second-largest national park in Peninsular Malaysia after Taman Negara. It has approximately 26 km (16 mi) of trail. It is the second national park proclaimed by the government of Malaysia. Gunung Besar, the second-highest peak in Johor, is in the park.

The park takes its name from the Endau and Rompin rivers that flow through the park. Other rivers in the park are the Segamat, Selai, and Jasin.

There are two official entry points to the park: the Kampung Peta entrance located along the eastern boundary in Mersing District, and the Selai entrance at the southwestern boundary in Segamat District.

During the monsoon season from November till March, the park is closed to the public. Fishing is banned from September till October during the mating season.

== History ==
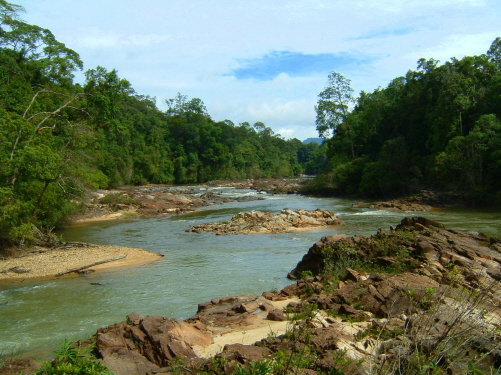
Jasin River joins Endau at Kuala Jasin.

The first scientific study of the area was conducted in 1892 by H.W. Lake and Lieutenant H.J. Kelsall. With the aid of the study, the forest complex of Endau-Kluang was gazetted as a forest reserve in 1933. Later in 1972, the forest reserve was expanded to include Lesong forest reserve in Pahang.

In the same year, the federal government came up with a proposal to federally protect 2,000 km^{2} of the complex as a national park. At that time there was no legal mechanism to create a national park. In 1980, the National Parks Act 1980 (Malaysia) was passed by the Malaysian Parliament. However, dispute between federal and state powers prevented the creation of a national park in the area at that time. Five years later, the Department of Wildlife and National Parks proposed roughly the same areas to be gazetted as wildlife sanctuary to protect the critically endangered Sumatran rhinoceros. In 2022, Endau-Rompin National Park was declared an ASEAN heritage park.

== Flora and fauna ==
Endau-Rompin is one of the oldest tropical rainforest complexes in the world and features rock formations some 248 million years old.

Mammals endemic to Endau-Rompin include the Malayan tiger, Indochinese leopard, Clouded leopard, Asian golden cat, Leopard cat, Marbled cat, Asian elephant, Malayan tapir, Bornean bearded pig, Banded pig, Barking deer, Sambar deer, Lesser mouse deer, Greater mouse deer, Sunbear, Long-tailed macaque, Pig-tailed macaque, Dusky leaf monkey and Banded Langur.

It used to have the largest remaining population of the threatened Northern Sumatran rhinoceros species on the Malay Peninsula, but they are now extinct in the wild for the whole of Malaysia.

The Gollum's toad, Ingerophrynus gollum, is only known from the Endau-Rompin National Park.

== See also ==
- Protected areas of Johor
- List of national parks of Malaysia
- Rompin State Park
