= National Parks Act =

National Parks Act may refer to, among others, these acts:

- National Parks Act (Canada)
- National Parks Act 1980 (Malaysia)
- National Parks Act 1980 (New Zealand)
- National Parks and Access to the Countryside Act 1949 (United Kingdom)
