= Harimau Island =

Island in Mersing, Johor, Malaysia

Native name: Pulau Harimau
- Interactive map of Harimau Island

Geography
- Location: South China Sea
- Coordinates: 2°33′34″N 103°56′40″E
- Archipelago: Babi Islands
- Area: 0.16 km^{2} (0.062 sq mi)

Administration
- Malaysia
- State: Johor
- District: Mersing
- Mukim: Babi Islands

Harimau Island (Malay: Pulau Harimau, lit. 'Tiger Island') is an island in Mersing District, Johor, Malaysia. It is one of the 11 islands of the Babi Island chain.

== See also ==
- List of islands of Malaysia
