= Besar Island, Johor =

Island in Mersing District, Johor, Malaysia

Besar Island
Native name: Pulau Besar Formerly Known As Pulau Babi Besar
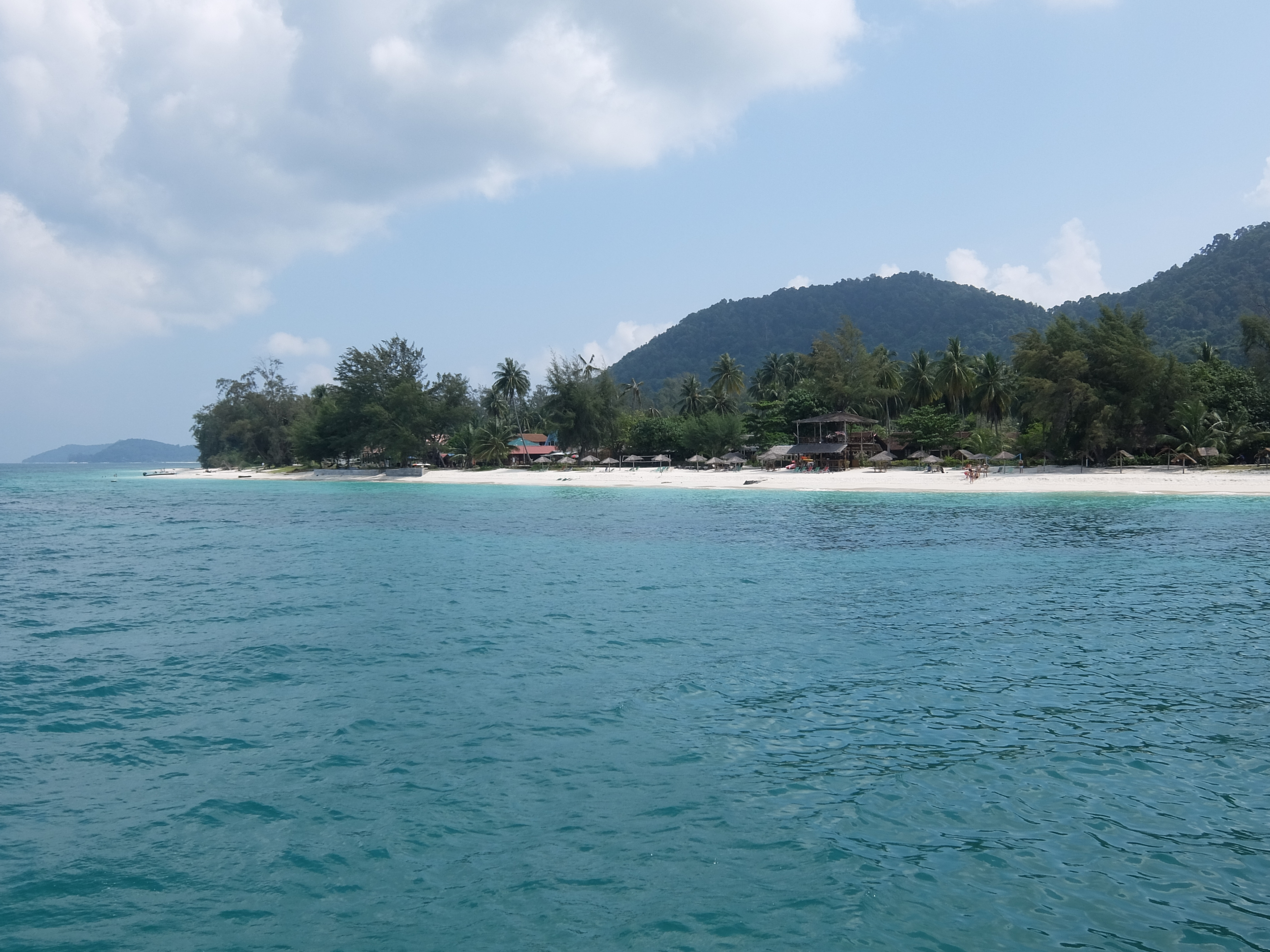
- Interactive map of Besar Island

Geography
- Location: South China Sea
- Coordinates: 2°26′30″N 103°59′00″E
- Archipelago: Babi Islands
- Area: 4.77 km^{2} (1.84 sq mi)
- Highest elevation: 258 m (846 ft)

Administration
- Malaysia
- State: Johor
- District: Mersing
- Mukim: Babi Islands

Demographics
- Population: 184 (2020)
- Languages: Malaysian Malay, Johor-Riau Malay
- Ethnic groups: Malays

Additional information
- Time zone: MST (UTC+08:00)
- Postal code: 86800

Besar Island (Malay: Pulau Besar), also known as Babi Besar Island (Malay: Pulau Babi Besar) is an island in Mersing District, Johor, Malaysia.

== Name ==
A word of mouth legend tells of a fisherman's wife who was pregnant and craved for seaweed to eat. Upon eating the seaweed, she turned into a mermaid. Her husband was extremely angered by this, and screamed "babi! babi! babi!" ("pig! pig! pig!"; here used as an insult or curse), and called the island "pulau babi" ("pig island") from then on.

== Geology ==
The island, which is surrounded by Rawa, Sibu and Tinggi Island, is characterised by quiet, clean beaches of powdery white sand and crystal-clear azure waters. To preserve the unspoiled marine life, the Government has gazetted it as a marine park to protect around 60 species of marine life from any activities that can harm their natural habitats within 2 nautical miles (3.7 km) around the island.

The island's highest point rises some 845 feet (258 m) above the sea level. Rich hues of wild vegetation are dappled throughout with the lush greens of the coconut palms and tropical jungles.

== Administrative divisions ==
The island is divided into 6 villages, which are:

- Atap Zing Village
- Batu Hitam Village
- Busong Village
- Teluk Bakau Village
- Teluk Kampa Village
- Teluk Penagat Village

== Transportation ==
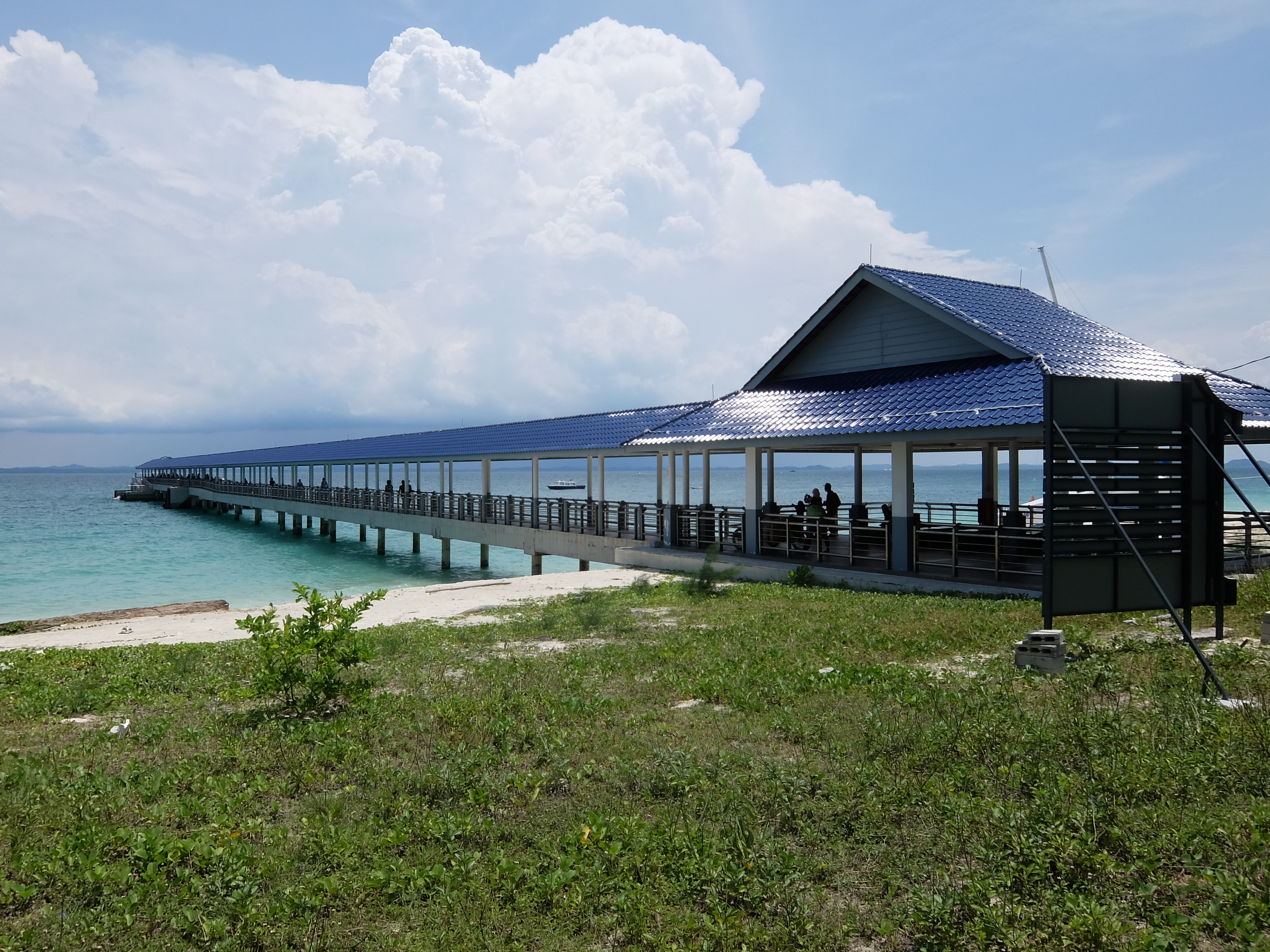
Besar Island jetty

The island is accessible by boat from Mersing Town in Johor mainland.

== See also ==
- List of islands of Malaysia
