= Mersing Airport =

Mersing Airport Lapangan Terbang Mersing
- IATA: MEP; ICAO: WMAU

Summary
- Operator: University of Technology Malaysia
- Location: Mersing, Johor, Malaysia
- Time zone: MST (UTC+08:00)
- Elevation AMSL: 10 ft (3.0 m)
- Coordinates: 02°23′00″N 103°51′34″E

Map
- Location in West Malaysia

Runways
Direction	Length		Surface
Direction	m	ft	Surface
15/33	500	1,640	Grass
- Sources: AIP Malaysia

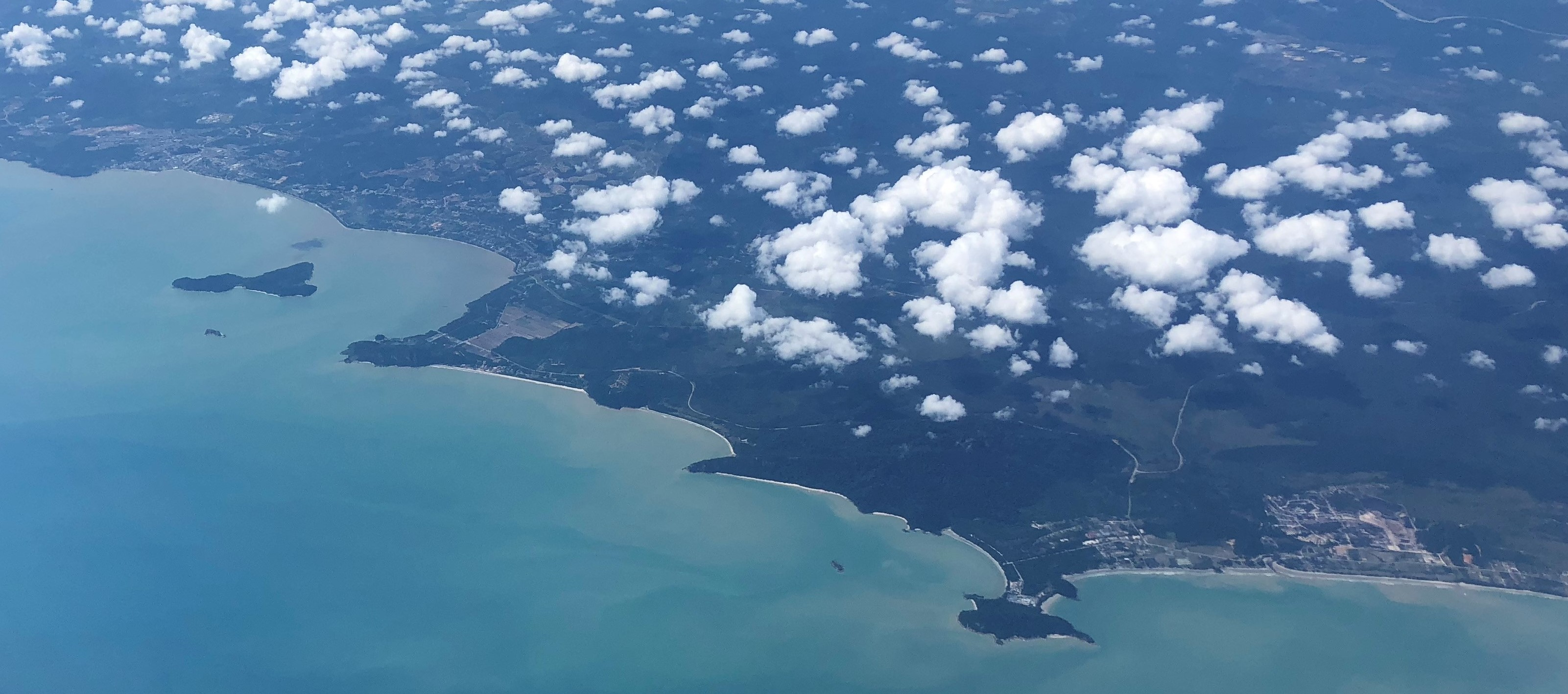
Aerial view of the east coast of Johor state (Malaysia). The settlement Mersing is to the left.

Mersing Airport (IATA: MEP, ICAO: WMAU) is an airport in Mersing District, Johor, Malaysia.

== See also ==
- List of airports in Malaysia
