= National Parks Act 1980 (Malaysia) =

Malaysian federal law

Parliament of Malaysia
- Long title: An Act to provide for the establishment and control of National Parks and for matters connected therewith.
- Citation: Act 226
- Territorial extent: Malaysia (except Sabah and Sarawak; and the Taman Negara located in Kelantan, Pahang, and Terengganu)
- Passed by: Dewan Rakyat
- Passed: 11 December 1979
- Passed by: Dewan Negara
- Passed: 18 January 1980
- Royal assent: 11 February 1980
- Commenced: 28 February 1980
- Effective: 29 February 1980

Legislative history

First chamber: Dewan Rakyat
- Bill title: National Parks Bill 1979
- Bill citation: D.R. 26/1979
- First reading: 12 October 1979
- Second reading: 17 October 1979
- Third reading: 11 December 1979

Second chamber: Dewan Negara
- Bill title: National Parks Bill 1979
- Bill citation: D.R. 26/1979
- Member(s) in charge: Ong Kee Hui, Minister of Science, Technology and Environment
- First reading: 12 December 1979
- Second reading: 15 January 1980
- Third reading: 18 January 1980

Amended by
- National Parks (Amendment) Act 1983 [Act A571] Federal Territory of Labuan (Modification of the National Parks Enactment) Order 1984 [P.U. (A) 187/1984]

Keywords
- National park, Wildlife conservation, Ecotourism
- Status: In force

The National Parks Act 1980 (Malay: Akta Taman Negara 1980) is a Malaysian federal law that governs the creation and the maintenance national parks in Malaysia. It was created in 1980 during the controversy surrounding the protection of Endau Rompin forest complex. The act provides for the states to establish national parks to be administered by Department of Wildlife and National Parks under the federal government.

During its passing, the debate on state and federal power was common. The states and in particular Johor within the context of that time did not agree to the act as it was seen as surrendering states' right to the federal government. This objection prevented the Endau and Rompin from being gazetted as a national park prior to the 1990s. The act still gives rights for the State Authority to vote sections of land can be preserved for maintenance of roads, airstrips, reservoirs, dams, and service buildings.

This Act do not apply to Sabah and Sarawak, and the State Parks of Kelantan, Pahang and Terengganu which together formed the Taman Negara areas as described in the Schedule to the Taman Negara (Kelantan) Enactment [En. 14 of 1938] and in the First Schedules to the Taman Negara (Pahang) Enactment 1939 [En. 2 of 1938] and the Taman Negara (Terengganu) Enactment [En. 6 of 1358H].

== Structure ==
The National Parks Act 1980, in its current form (1 January 2013), consists of 11 sections and no schedule (including 2 amendments), without separate Part.

- Section 1: Short title and application
- Section 2: Interpretation
- Section 3: Establishment of National Park
- Section 4: Object of establishment of National Parks
- Section 5: National Parks Advisory Council
- Section 6: Functions of National Parks Advisory Council
- Section 7: Establishment of National Parks committees
- Section 8: Director General and other persons to be responsible for proper carrying out of provisions of Act
- Section 9: Occupation of land within National Park
- Section 10: General prohibition of mining within National Park
- Section 11: Regulations

== National Park Establishment ==
In preservation of the lands, the State Authority has the right to request areas of reserved land to be placed under the control of the National Park committee. This establishment was created to protect wild life and objects of the environment while promoting education of conservation to the people of Malaysia.

== National Park Advisory Council and its functions ==
The National Park Advisory Council was established to create a representative body for the National Parks. This would ensure different levels within the council to ensure different checks on committees. Positions include Chairman, State Secretary of each State where National Parks are located, Director General, Treasurer, representative of the Economic Planning Unit of the Prime Minister's Department, representative of the Tourist Development Corporation, and representative of the Department of Forestry. These positions will ensure the conservation and development of the National Park.

== Occupation of lands ==
Any land that is leased by the State Authorities are under the consideration of the National Park which can be used for the construction and maintenance or roads, airstrips, dams and reservoirs, hotels, rest houses, dwelling houses, buildings, works of public utility, and mining. Several restrictions do come with the general prohibition of mining within the National Park such as the contradiction of general interests to the State and the failure to have a license to mine. Although the land can be used for mining, there is general restrictions prohibiting the use of mining within the National Park. In order for mining to occur, the National Park must see a mining certificate or lease issued that grants rights to the passage. Without such, there will be implications due to the respect o the National Park Land.

== Regulation of lands ==
The State Authority may still make regulations to the Act that will further the protection of the wildlife or land preservation. Acts include prohibition of killing, capturing wildlife, burning or cutting down vegetation within the National Park, or other regulations of misconduct that would harm the enjoyment of the National Park.

== See also ==
- National Parks Act
