= Rawa Island =

Island of Malaysia

Native name: Pulau Rawa, ڤولاو راوا
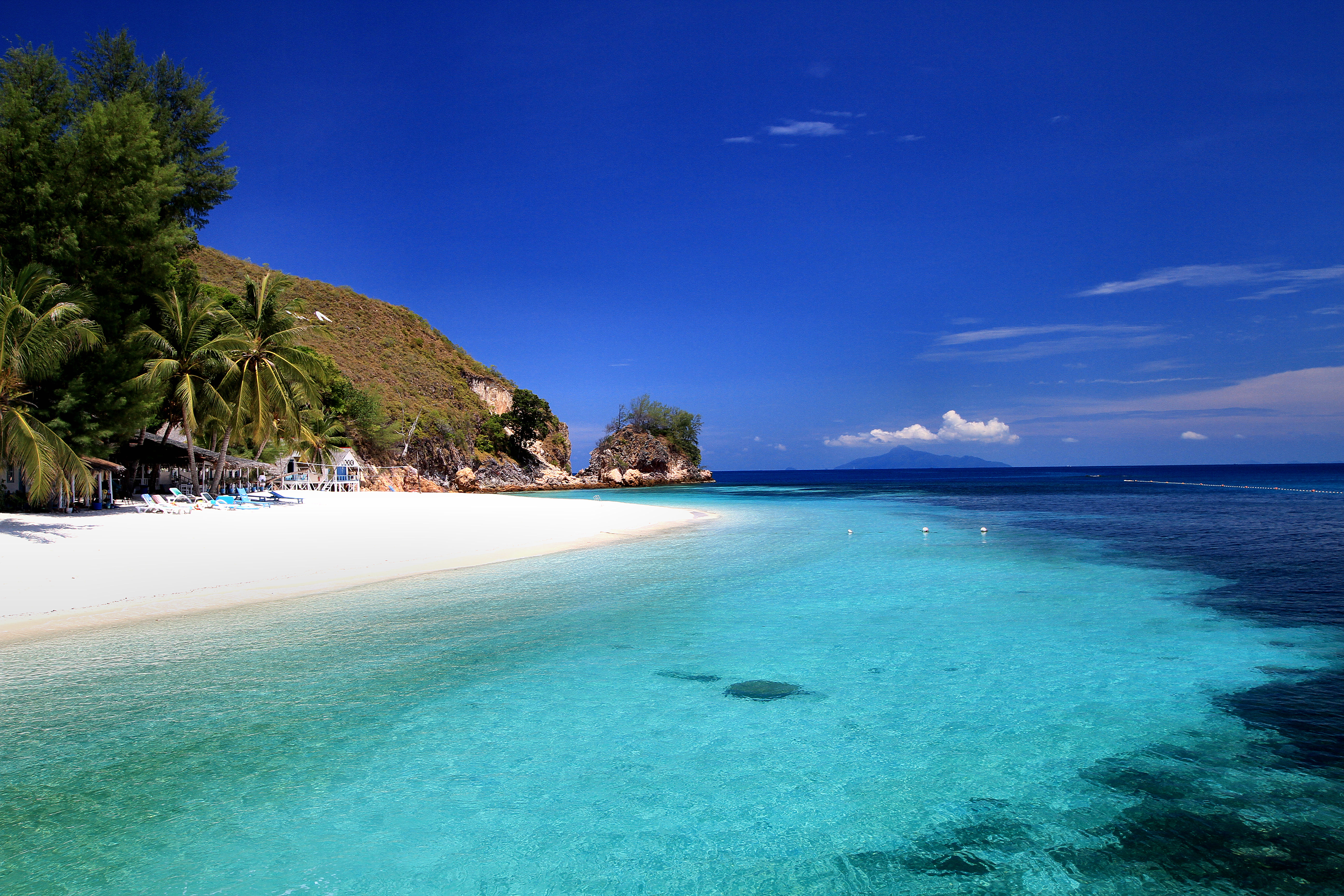
- Interactive map of Rawa Island

Geography
- Location: South China Sea
- Coordinates: 2°31′13″N 103°58′33″E
- Archipelago: Babi Islands
- Area: 0.23 km^{2} (0.089 sq mi)

Administration
- Malaysia
- State: Johor
- District: Mersing
- Mukim: Babi Islands

Additional information
- Time zone: MST (UTC+08:00)
- Postal code: 86800

Rawa Island (Malay: Pulau Rawa) is a coral island in Mersing District, Johor, Malaysia. Nearby islands include Harimau and Mensirip.

"Rawa" is the local term for white doves, which are abundant in the island.

Rawa is a relatively small island. There are no proper roads, only a few walkways. One side of the island is a beach covered with white sand, while the other side has a rocky vertical cliff. The water is clear. There are many sea and land creatures such as fishes, squids, jellyfish, octopuses, Malayan sea eagles, and reptiles. Blacktip reef sharks can be found feeding in the sea off rawa. Rawa's waters are home to an abundance of corals. There are two resorts on the island: Rawa Island Resort and Alang's Rawa.

== Transportation ==
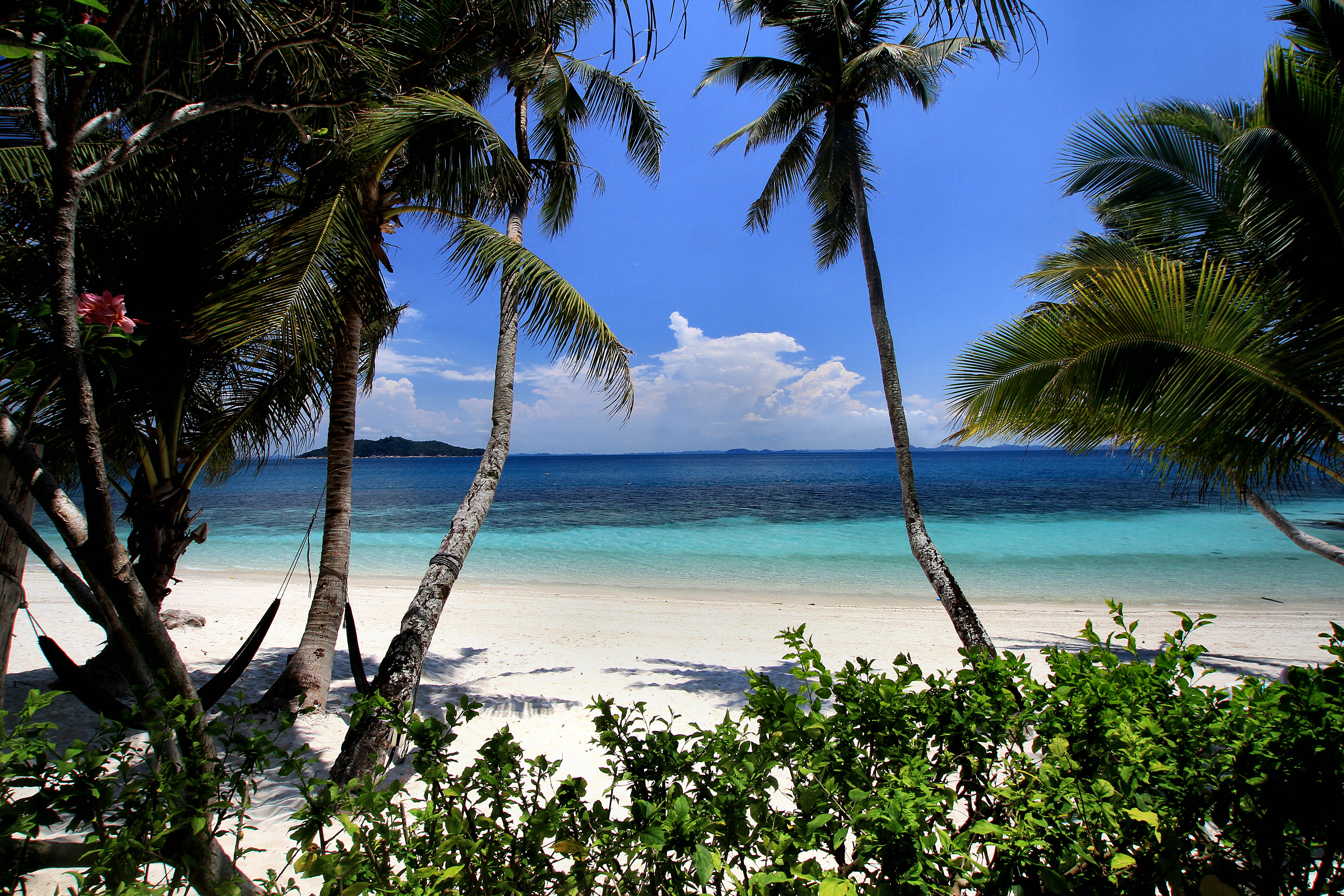
Coconut trees in the island.

Rawa Island is approximately 30 minutes boat ride from Mersing town, a small port within Johor.

== See also ==
- List of islands of Malaysia
