= Tinggi Island =

Island in Malaysia

Native name: Pulau Tinggi, ڤولاو تيڠڬي
- Interactive map of Tinggi Island

Geography
- Location: South China Sea
- Coordinates: 2°18′N 104°07′E

Administration
- Malaysia
- State: Johor

Tinggi Island (Malay: Pulau Tinggi) is an island in Mersing District, Johor, Malaysia.

== Name ==
The island was historically known to Chinese seamen (將軍帽) as the "General's Hat" island, a reference to the shape of Mount Semundu.

== Geography ==
The island is located about 20 nautical miles (37 km) southeast of Mersing Town, off the east coast of Johor.

== Geology ==
The island rises up to 600 meters above sea level at a peak named Mount Semundu. The interior of the island is mostly covered with secondary lowland Dipterocarp rainforest. It has fresh waters, fruits, rattan, timber and a sheltered harbour and coral reefs which abound with prolific marine life. It has a long coastline and white sandy beaches dotted with caves. The seas around it contain coral, fish and reef. The island mostly consists of pyroclastic rock with up to 5 mm diameter in size.

== Demographics ==
This island has the highest residential population among the east coast Johor islands, with the latest tally estimated at 448 people, from three village settlements: Kampung Tanjung Balang, Kampung Pasir Panjang and Kampung Sebirah Besar.

== Transportation ==
The island is accessible by ferry from Mersing Town with an approximately 30-minute journey.

== See also ==
- List of islands of Malaysia
