= Senai Airport Mosque =

Mosque in Kulai, Johor, Malaysia

- Masjid Lapangan Terbang Antarabangsa Senai
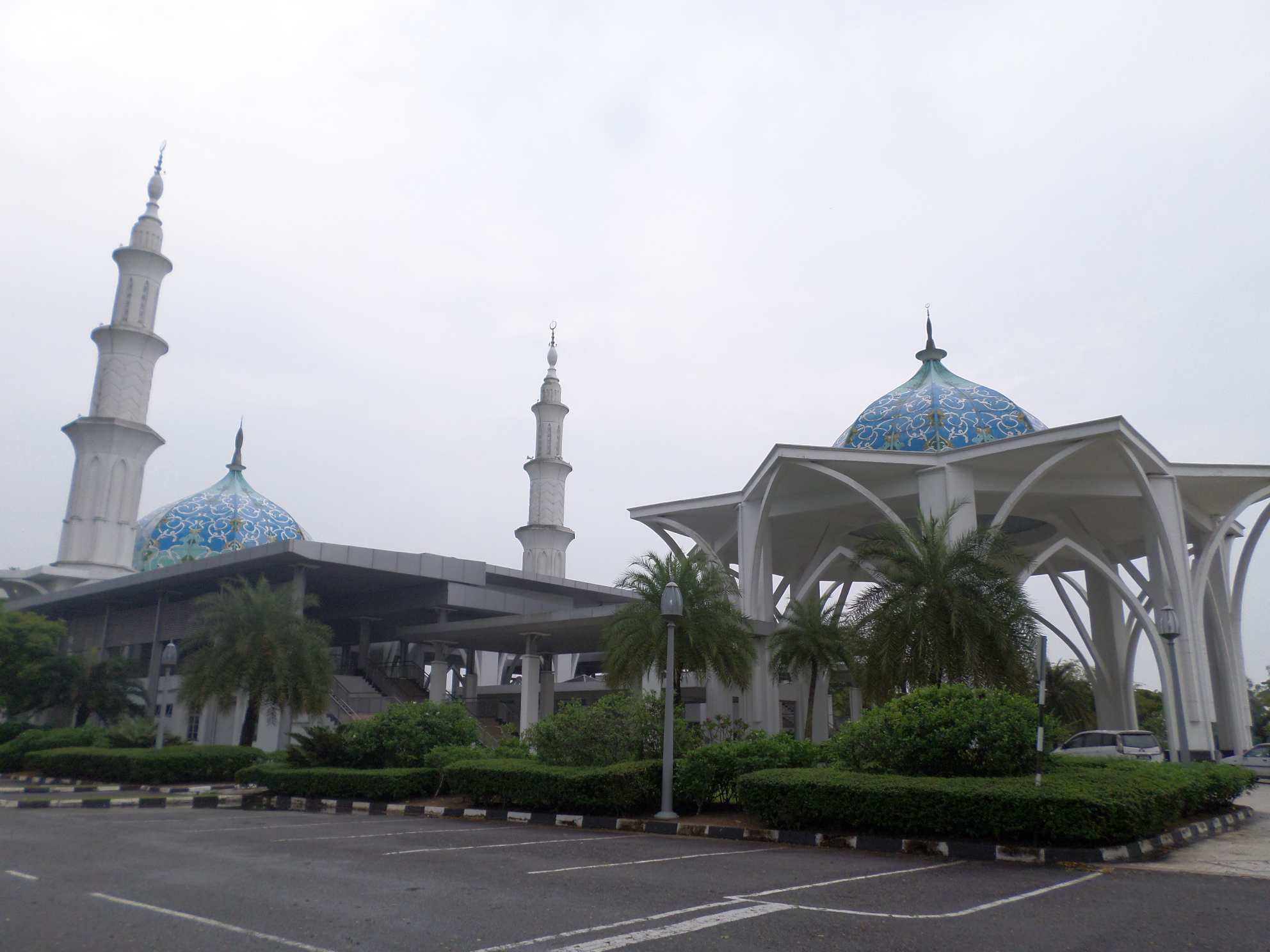

- Location within Johor

Religion
- Affiliation: Islam
- Branch/tradition: Sunni

Location
- Location: Lot 4639, Jalan Lapangan Terbang Senai, Senaijaya, Johor, Malaysia
- Interactive map of Senai Airport Mosque
- Coordinates: 1°38′8.2″N 103°39′41.8″E

Architecture
- Architect: KAZ Akitek
- Type: Mosque
- General contractor: Teguh Runding Sdn Bhd. Johor (Civil and Structural Design Consultant)
- Completed: 2010
- Minaret: 2

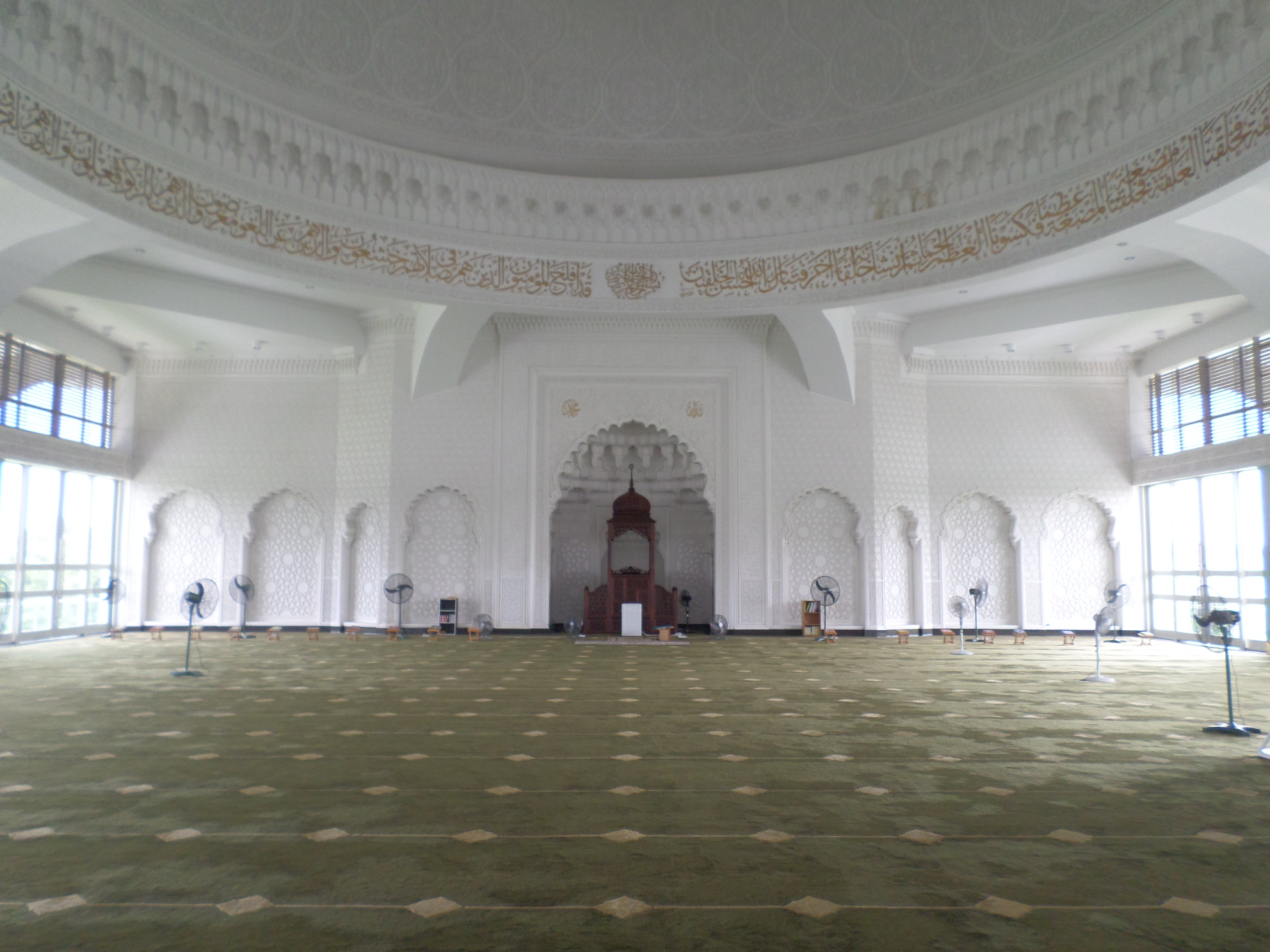
Senai Airport Mosque prayer hall

The Senai Airport Mosque (Malay: Masjid Lapangan Terbang Antarabangsa Senai) is a main mosque in Senai International Airport in Senai, Kulai District, Johor, Malaysia. It was built in 2003 and completed in 2010. It is also used as an international mosque for tourist who travel through Senai Airport. It is also a public mosque for Muslims from Kampung Maju Jaya and townships from Senai.

== See also ==
- Islam in Malaysia
