= Sibu Island =

Island group in Mersing District, Johor, Malaysia

Native name: Pulau Sibu, ڤولاو سيبو
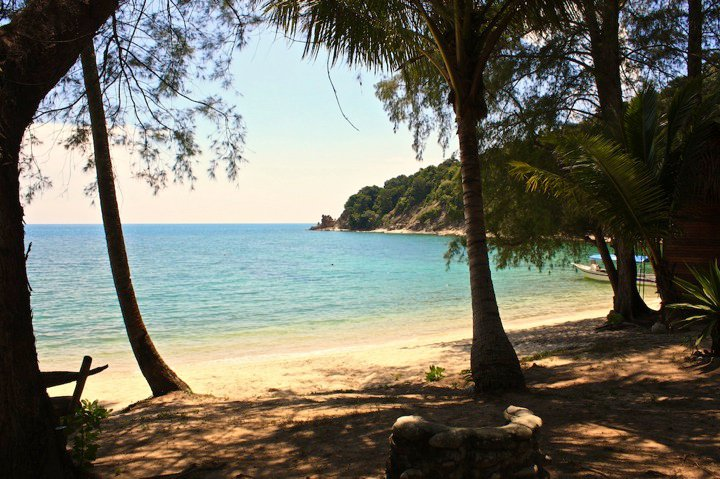
- Beach at Sibu Island
- Interactive map of Sibu Island

Geography
- Location: South China Sea
- Coordinates: 2°12′N 104°05′E
- Archipelago: Sibu Islands
- Area: 4.05 km^{2} (1.56 sq mi)

Administration
- Malaysia
- State: Johor
- District: Mersing
- Mukim: Sibu Islands

Demographics
- Population: 210 (2020)
- Languages: Malaysian Malay, Johor-Riau Malay
- Ethnic groups: Malays

Additional information
- Time zone: MST (UTC+08:00)
- Postal code: 86800

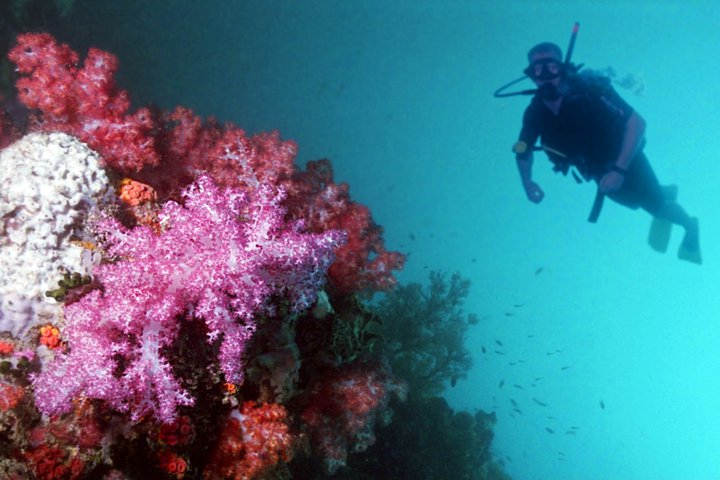
A scuba diver at Sibu Island.

Sibu Island (Malay: Pulau Sibu) is an island off the coast of Mersing District, Johor, Malaysia. It was declared as a marine park in 1993.

== Geography ==
It is located nearby several islands which are, Sibu Besar Island, Sibu Tengah Island, Sibu Kukus Island and Sibu Hujung Island. There are four main beaches on the eastern side of Sibu. Sibu Besar, the main island, is approximately 6 km long and 1 km wide, and for the most part covered by tropical vegetation.

== Geology ==
The island mostly consists of pyroclastic rock with ashy characteristics.

== Demographics ==
On the southern end of Sibu Besar Island, there is a small fishing village called Kampong Duku with a population of fewer than a hundred people (about 40 families).

== Activities ==
The main leisure activities on the island are watersports such as snorkelling and diving, and numerous coral reefs are close to hand. Most of the beach resorts are located on the eastern side of the main island. Sea Gypsy Village Resort and Dive Base and Sibu Island Cabanas are situated on a beach facing Tinggi Island. Other resorts, such as Rimba Resort, are on the opposite side. Resorts facing the mainland are MYVilla Farmstay, Coconut Village Resort, Junansa Villa and Twin Beach Resort. Most of the resorts are closed during the annual 3-month monsoon period, save for those facing the mainland.

== Transportation ==
The island is only accessible by ferry from Tanjong Leman Jetty in Mersing Town.

== See also ==
- List of islands of Malaysia
