= Aur Island =

Island in Mersing District, Johor, Malaysia

Native name: Pulau Aur
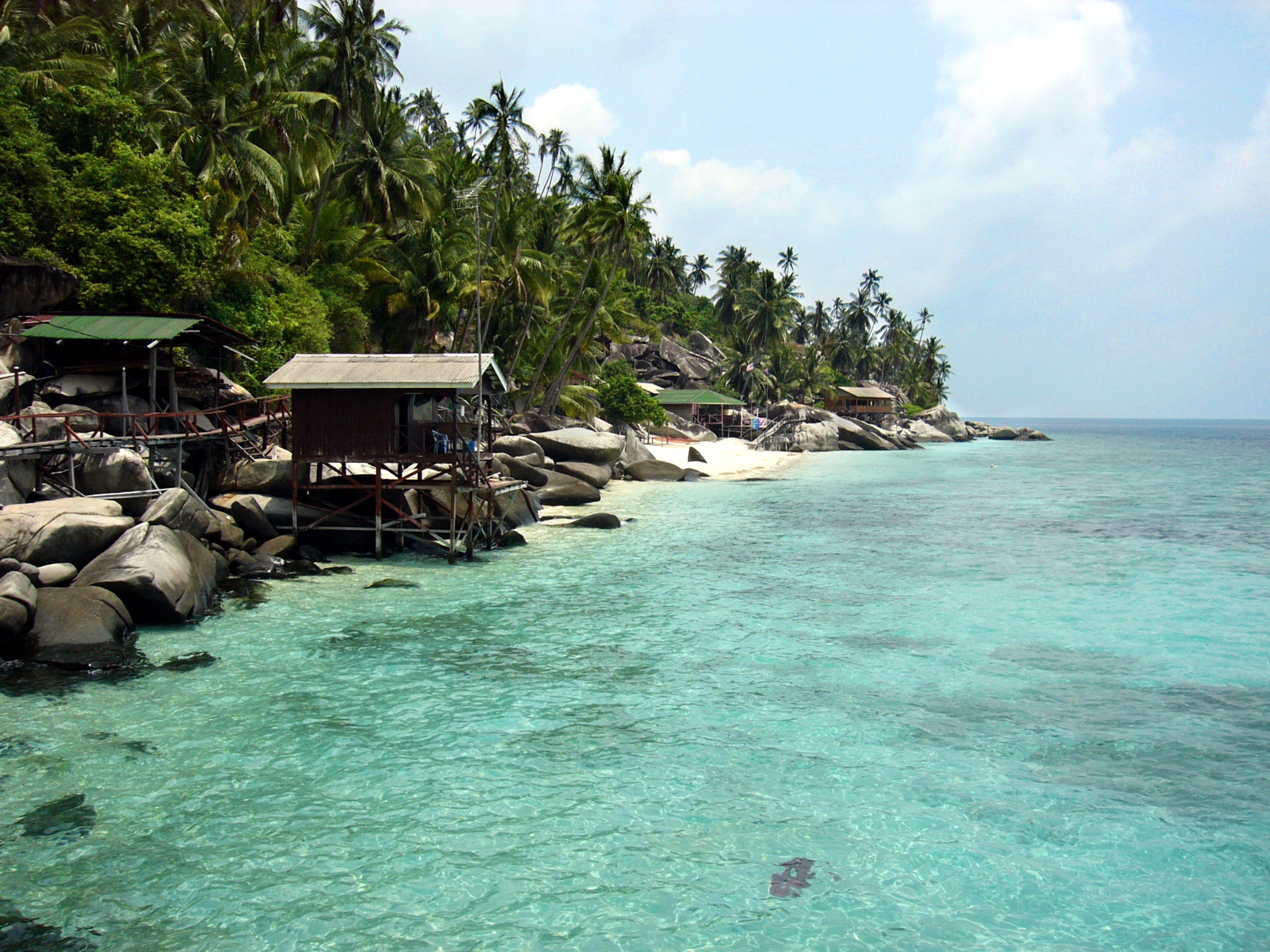
- A small scenic beach on Pulau Aur
- Interactive map of Aur Island

Geography
- Location: South China Sea
- Coordinates: 2°27′00″N 104°31′16″E
- Archipelago: Aur Islands
- Area: 14.50 km^{2} (5.60 sq mi)

Administration
- Malaysia
- State: Johor
- District: Mersing
- Mukim: Aur Islands

Demographics
- Population: 102 (2020)
- Languages: Malaysian Malay, Johor-Riau Malay
- Ethnic groups: Malays

Additional information
- Time zone: MST (UTC+08:00)
- Postal code: 86800

The Aur Island (Malay: Pulau Aur) is an island in Mersing District, Johor, Malaysia. It lies about 76 kilometres (47 mi) east of Mersing Town and is part of the Johor Marine Park. Its corals, lagoons and offshore pools make it a tourist attraction. It has for many years also been a frequent stopover point for fishermen.

There is also a smaller island close by, Dayang Island, which is separated from Aur Island by a narrow channel of about 400 metres (1,300 ft) width at the narrowest point. Both islands are home to Singaporean diving companies, divers reach the island by chartered boats from Mersing or Singapore.

== Diving ==
Due to its distance from the mainland of Peninsular Malaysia, Aur Island offers clear water at its dive sites. Marine life commonly seen by divers include manta ray, barracudas, whitetip sharks, rays, napoleon wrasse, jacks, trevally, yellowback fusiliers, turtle, angelfish, titan triggerfish and bumphead parrotfish.

== Climate ==
The Aur Island weather is affected by the monsoon winds that blows from South China Sea and the Straits of Malacca. The northeast monsoon blows the wind from South China Sea from November to March and this is the time when the east coast has heavy rainfall. Sea activities at this time are confined and the main activity at this time is usually the maintenance of boats and fishing related equipment and kite flying.

The west coast of Aur Island is influenced by the southwest monsoon that blows the wind from the Straits of Malacca during the months of May to September. The periods between the monsoons are usually marked by heavy rainfall. The mountains have lower temperature range due to their higher altitude and the temperature ranges from 16 to 24 °C (61 to 75 °F).

== History ==
The 1804 naval Battle of Pulo Aura between the British and the French took place in the island's vicinity during the Napoleonic Wars.

== Geology ==
The island spreads over an area of 7.2 km^{2}.

== See also ==
- Battle of Pulo Aura
