= Mersing District =

District in Johor, Malaysia

- District of Johor
- Daerah Mersing
- Flag
- Interactive map of Mersing District
- Location of Mersing District in Malaysia
- Coordinates: 2°20′N 103°40′E
- Country: Malaysia
- State: Johor
- Seat: Mersing
- Local area government(s): Mersing District Council

Government
  - District officer: Asman Shah bin Abd Rahman

Area
  - Total: 2,838.47 km^{2} (1,095.94 sq mi)

Population (2020)
  - Total: 78,195
  - Density: 27.548/km^{2} (71.350/sq mi)
- Time zone: UTC+8 (MST)
  - Summer (DST): UTC+8 (Not observed)
- Postcode: 86xxx
- Calling code: +6-07
- Vehicle registration plates: J

Mersing District is one of the 10 districts district in Johor, Malaysia. Its seat is located at Mersing Town.

== Etymology ==
The "Mersing" name is derived from the Chinese "Mau Sheng Port" (茂盛港) since 1880 and further simplify to Mersing. Mersing's Chinese name was renamed to "Feng Sheng Port" (丰盛港), with the meaning of good harvest. There are also said that Mersing's name is derived from Sikh traders who named Amir Singh and Men Singh.

== Geology ==
Beside the mainland area, the district also consists of 36 islands.

== Geography ==
With an area of 2,838 km^{2}, Mersing District is the third largest district in Johor, which covers 14.6% area of the state.

== Demographics ==
Historical population
Year	Pop.	±%
1991	63,643	—
2000	67,605	+6.2%
2010	69,028	+2.1%
2020	78,195	+13.3%

In 2000, the annual population growth of the district was 1.21%.

== Federal Parliament and State Assembly Seats ==
List of Mersing district representatives in the Federal Parliament (Dewan Rakyat)

Parliament	Seat Name	Member of Parliament	Party
P154	Mersing	Muhammad Islahuddin Abas	PN (BERSATU)

List of Mersing district representatives in the State Legislative Assembly.

Parliament	State	Seat Name	State Assemblyman	Party
P154	N32	Endau	Alwiyah Talib	BN (UMNO)
P154	N33	Tenggaroh	Mohd Youzaimi Yusof	BN (UMNO)

== Administrative divisions ==
Map of Mukims of Mersing District.

Mersing District is divided into 14 mukims:

- Jemaluang
- Lenggor
- Mersing
- Padang Endau
- Penyabong
- Aur Islands
- Babi Islands
- Pemanggil Island
- Sibu Islands
- Tinggi Islands
- Sembrong
- Tenggaroh
- Tenglu
- Triang

And 4 big towns (bandar):

- Jemaluang
- Mersing
- Mersing Kanan
- Padang Endau

== Economy ==
The main economy activities in the district are ecotourism, fishery, marine activities, agriculture and light manufacturing.

== Tourist attractions ==
- Aur Island
- Besar Island
- Harimau Island
- Mount Arong Recreational Forest
- Pemanggil Island
- Rawa Island
- Sibu Island
- Endau-Rompin National Park

== Transportation ==
- Mersing Airport

== See also ==
- Districts of Malaysia
