= Mersing =

Mersing Merecing/Ngesing (Terengganu Malay)
- Town and district capital
- Mersing Town; Bandar Mersing
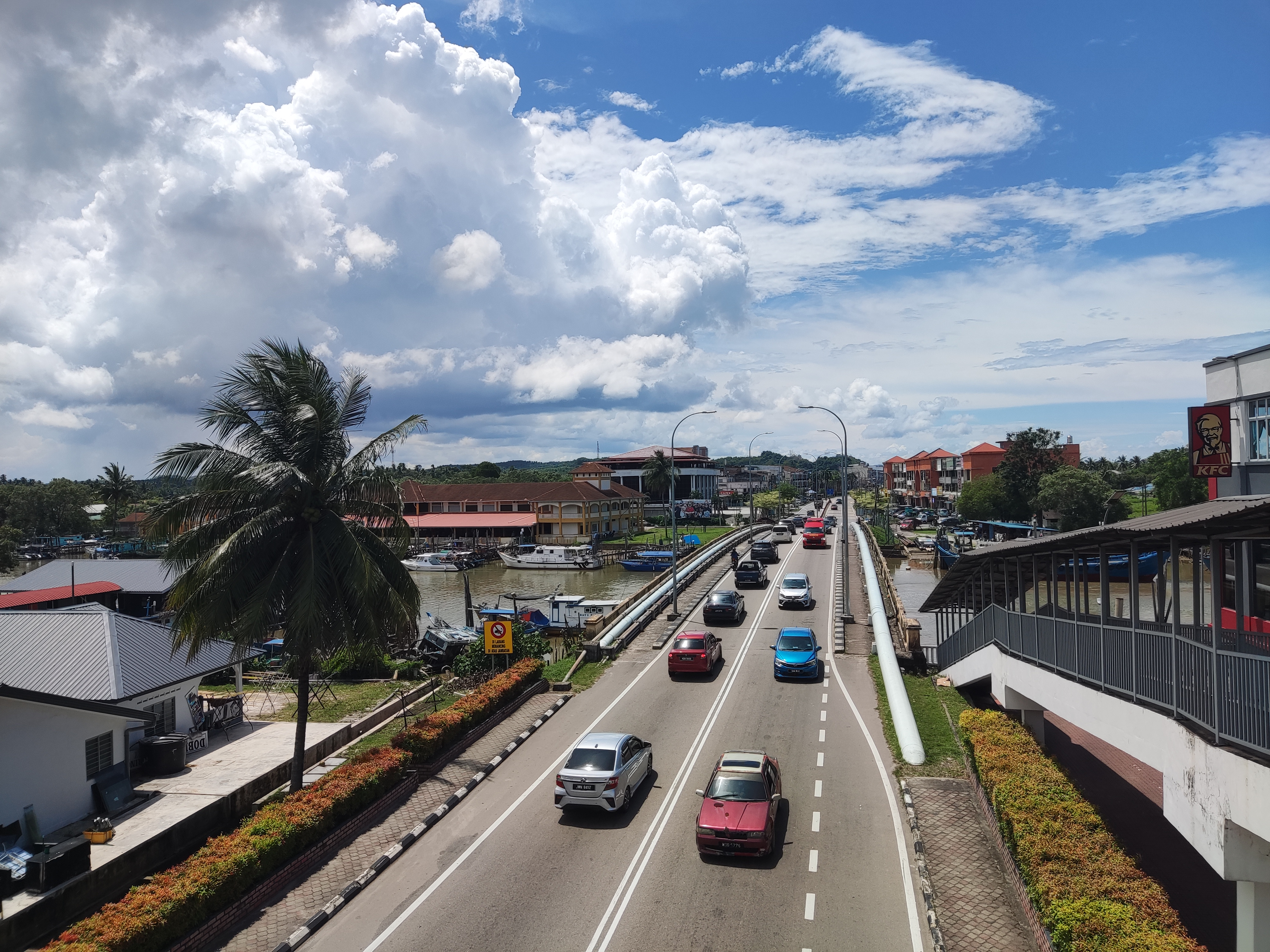
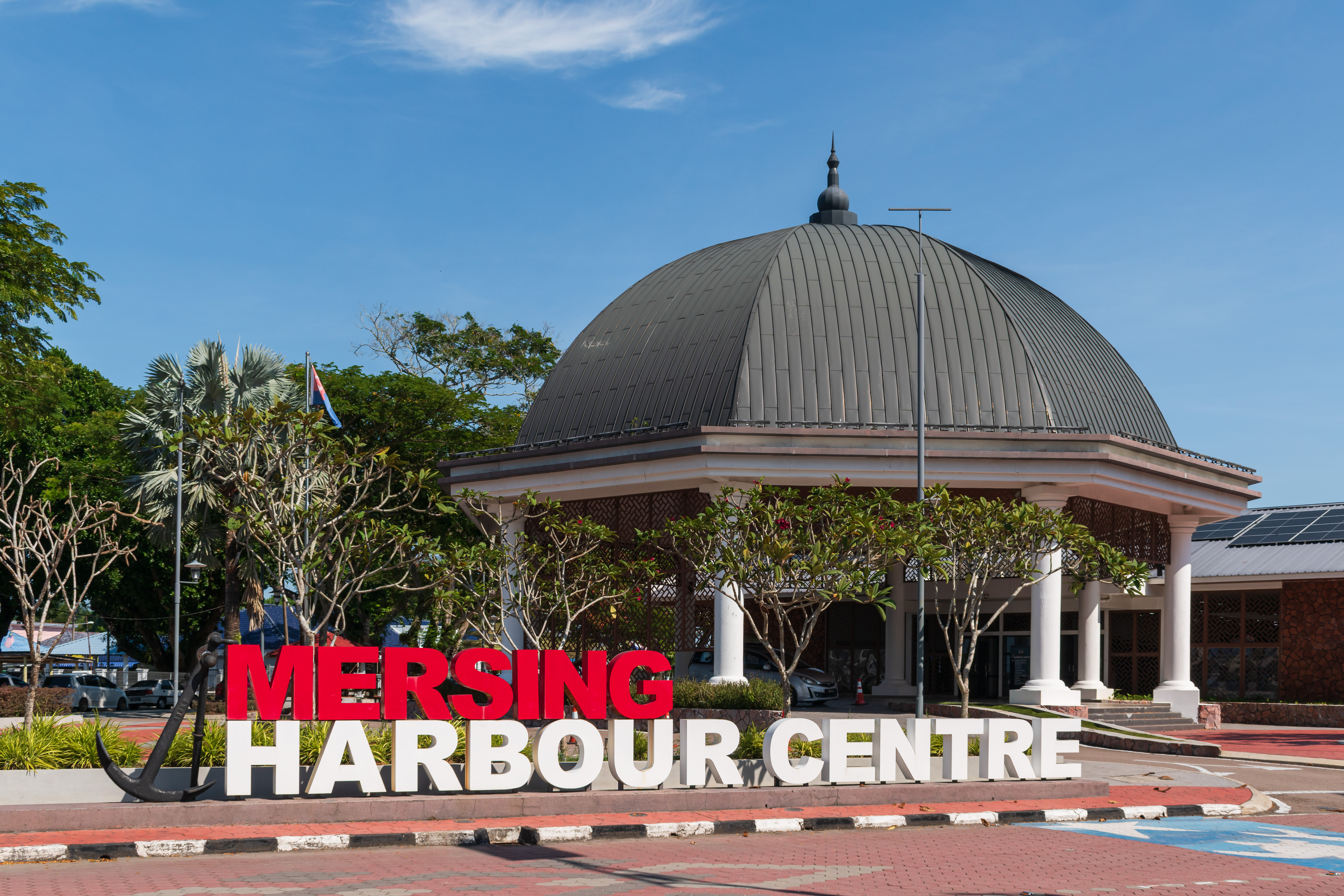
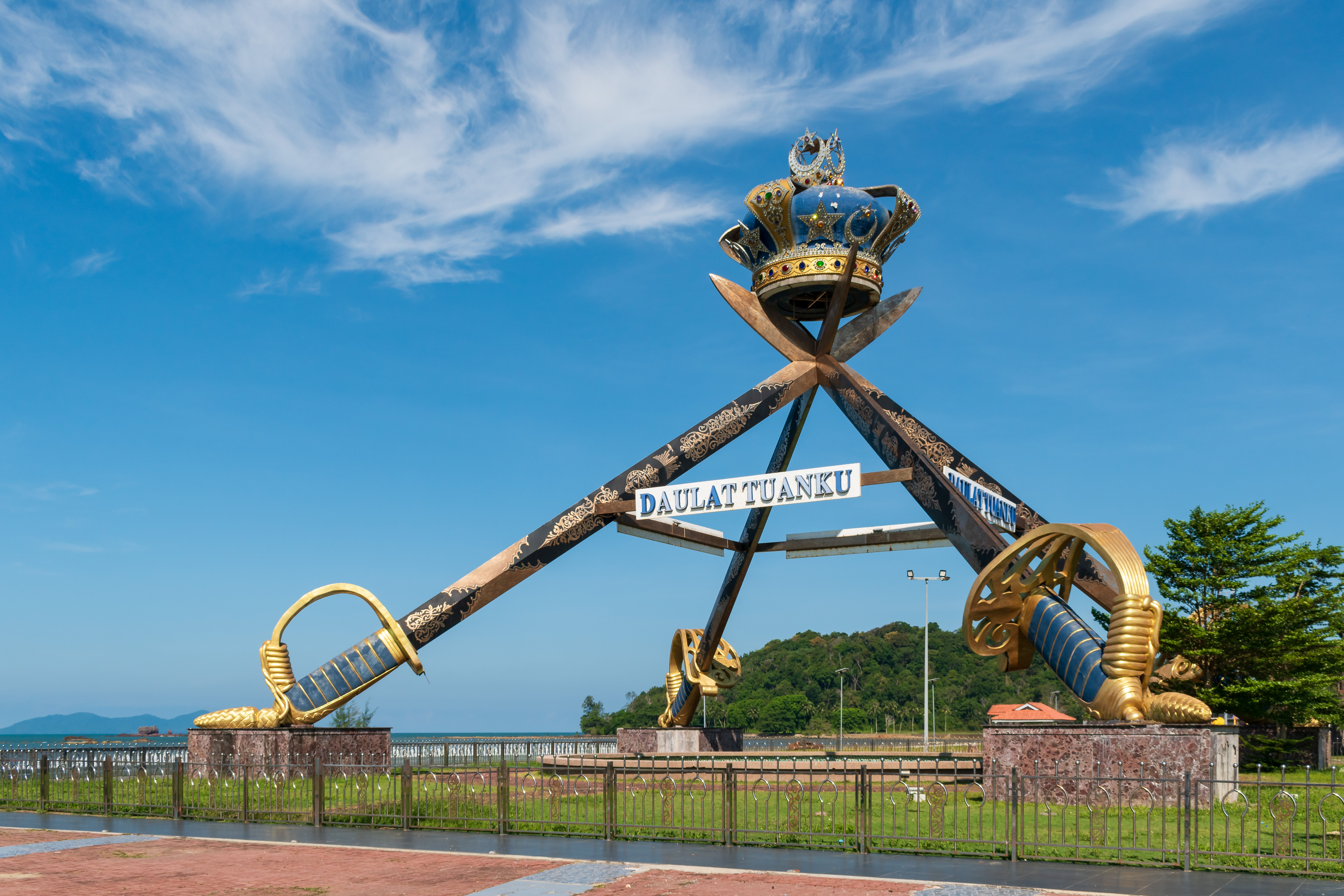
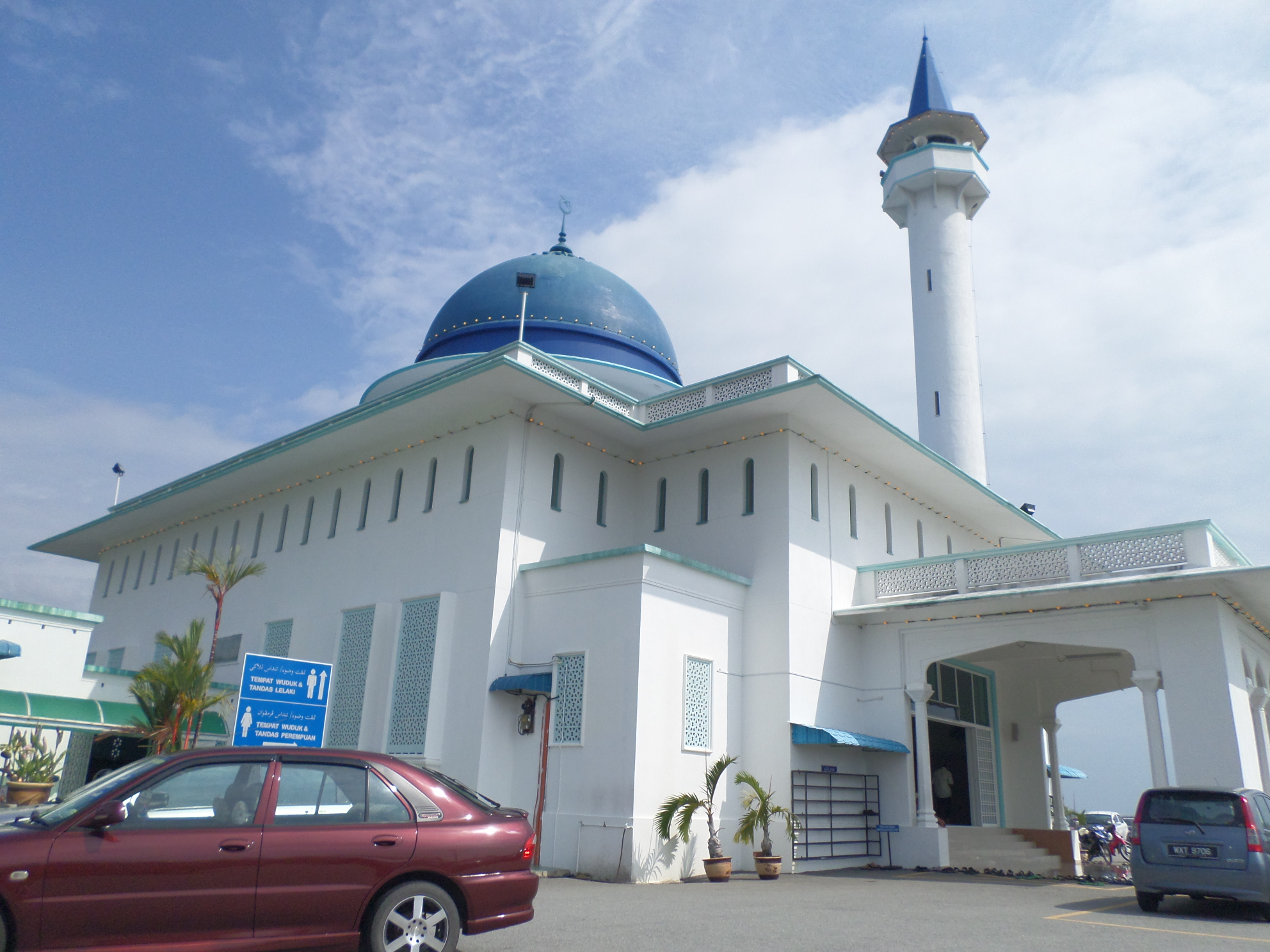
- Mersing Bridge Mersing Harbour Centre Mersing monument Mersing Town Mosque

- Coat of arms
- Motto(s): Perkhidmatan Untuk Rakyat "Service For The People" (motto of Mersing District Council)
- Location within Johor Location within Peninsular Malaysia Location within Malaysia
- Coordinates: 2°26′N 103°50′E
- Country: Malaysia
- State: Johor
- District: Mersing

Government
  - Type: Local government
  - Body: Mersing District Council
  - President: Abdul Karim Bakar (since 16 October 2025)

Area
  - Total: 761.47 km^{2} (294.01 sq mi)

Population (2010)
  - Total: 70,894
  - Density: 93.102/km^{2} (241.13/sq mi)
- Postcode: 86800
- Vehicle registration: J
- Website: www.mdmersing.gov.my

Mersing District Council Majlis Daerah Mersing
- Emblem

Type
- Type: Local authority of Mersing

History
- Founded: 26 May 1977

Leadership
- President: Abdul Karim Bakar (since 16 October 2025)
- Secretary: Muhammad Lufti Abas

Structure
- Seats: 24
- Political groups: Councillors: BN (24): UMNO (14); MCA (8); MIC (2)
- Length of term: 1 April 2024–31 December 2025

Motto
- Perkhidmatan Untuk Rakyat (Service for the People)

Meeting place
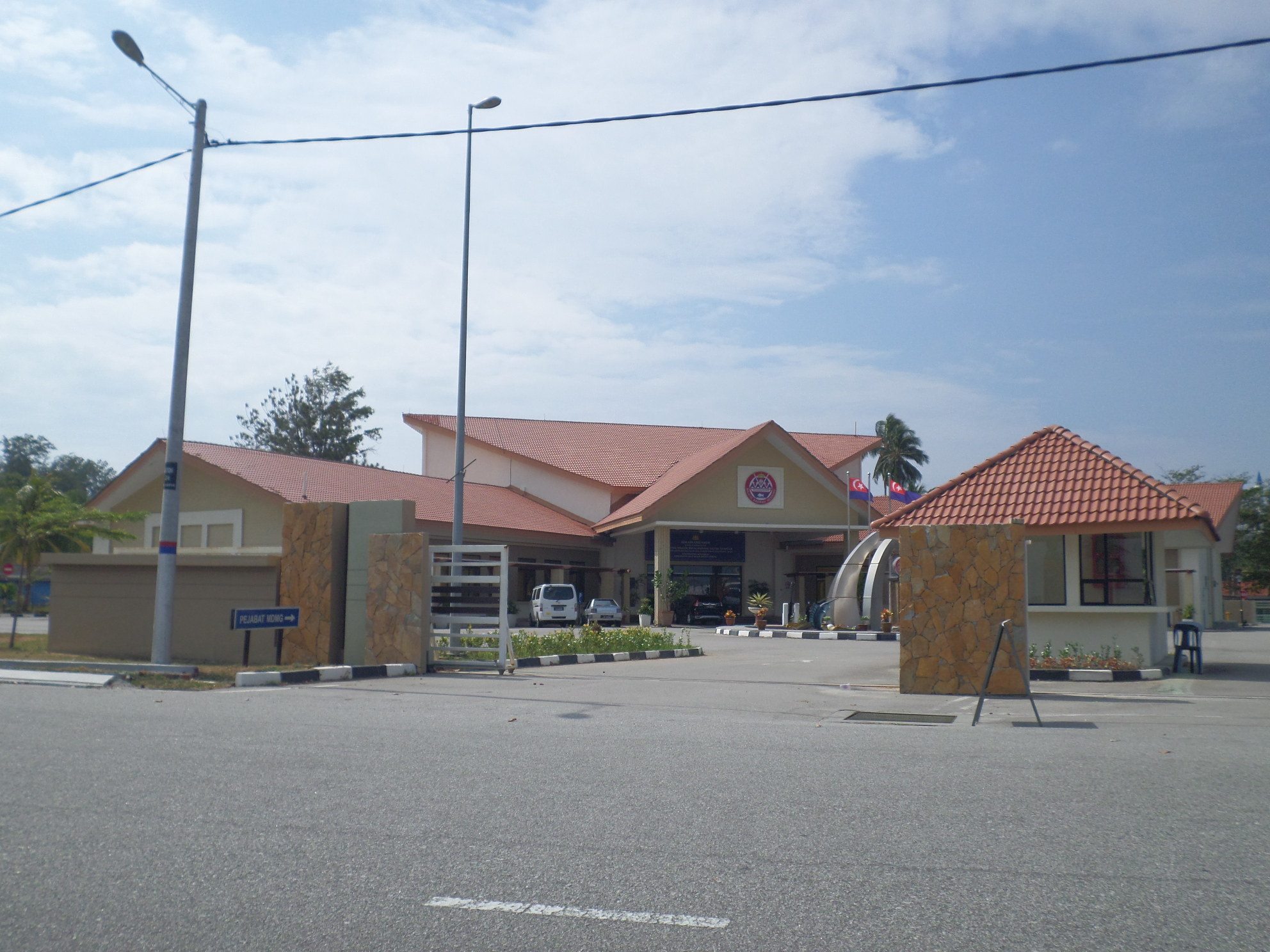
- No. 1 Jalan Tun Dr. Ismail, 86800 Mersing, Johor Darul Takzim

Website
- www.mdmersing.gov.my

Mersing (Terengganu Malay: Merecing or Ngesing) is a town, mukim and the capital of Mersing District, Johor, Malaysia. The town is located at the southern end of the east coast of Peninsular Malaysia. As of 2010, the town has an estimated population of 70,894.

Mersing town is particularly significant for a number of reasons: it is one of only two major towns in the eastern half of Johor state (the other being Kota Tinggi); it lies on the main trunk road that connects southern as well as eastern Johor with the east coast of Pahang state including Pahang's capital Kuantan (part of Federal Route; and it is the main departure point for ferries to the nearby offshore islands such as Rawa Island of Sultan Iskandar Marine Park (Malay: Taman Laut Sultan Iskandar) and also Tioman Island, Pahang.

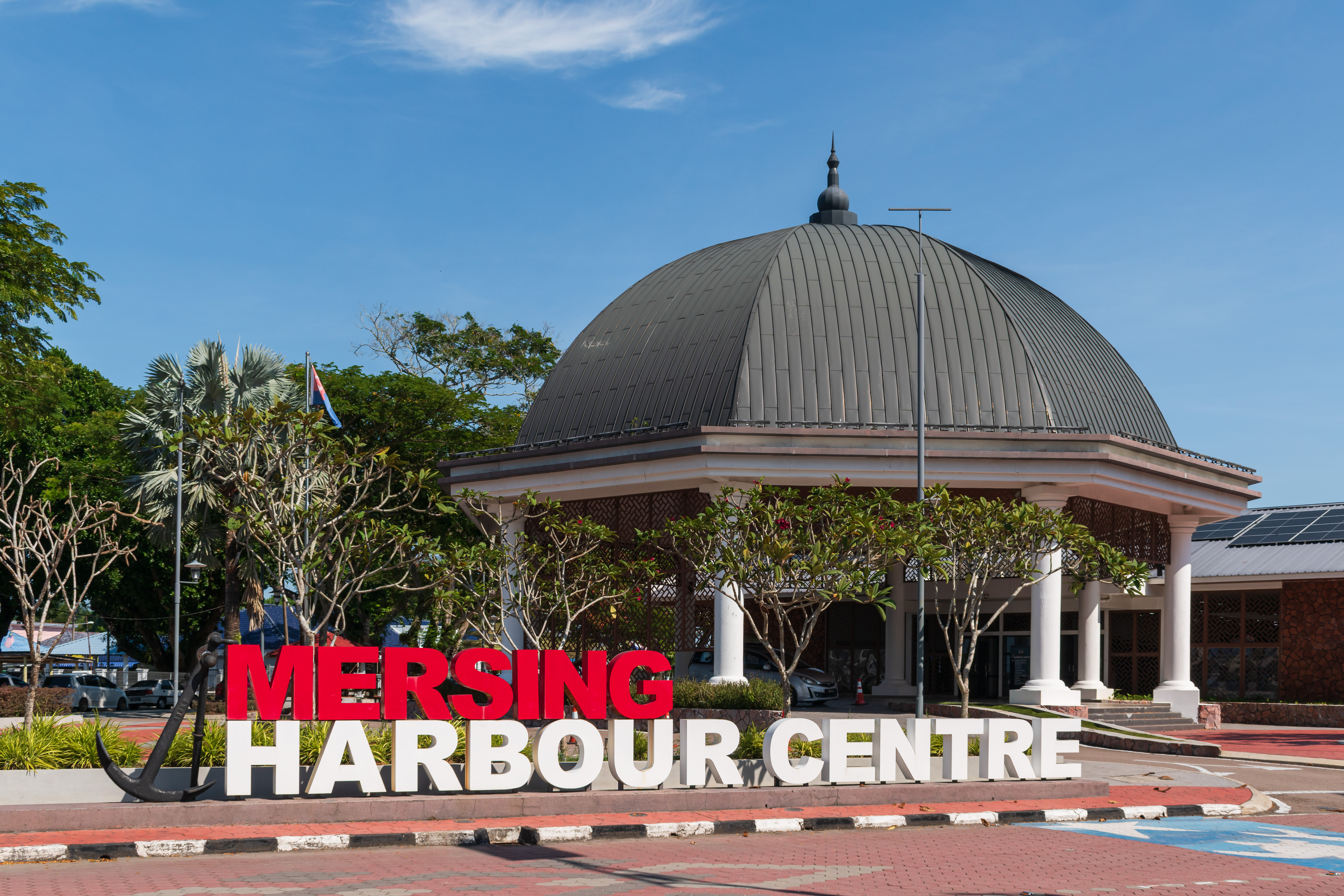
Mersing Harbour Centre, opened by Sultan Ibrahim Iskandar in 2017.

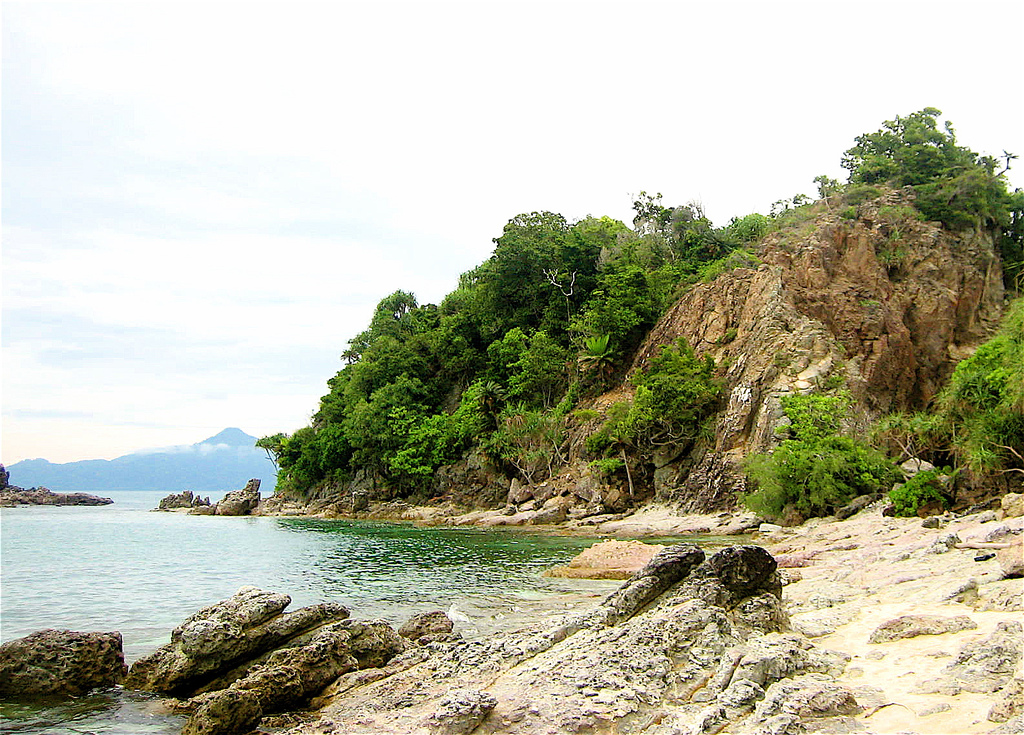
South China Sea coast in the vicinity of Mersing

== Government and politics ==
Mersing District Council (Malay: Majlis Daerah Mersing) is the local authority of the whole Mersing District including Mersing town. It was formed on 26 May 1977 through the merger of the Mersing Town Council (Malay: Majlis Bandaran Mersing) and the local councils (Malay: Majlis Tempatan) of Jemaluang, Endau, Kampung Hubong, Kampung Pengkalan Batu, Kampung Sri Pantai and Mersing Kecil.

=== Departments ===
- Management Services (Khidmat Pengurusan)
- Finance (Kewangan)
- Public Health and Municipal Services (Kesihatan Awam dan Perkhidmatan Perbandaran)
- Valuation and Property Management (Penilaian dan Pengurusan Harta)
- Developmental Planning and Landscape (Perancang Pembangunan dan Landskap)
- Engineering (Kejuruteraan)
- Licensing and Enforcement (Pelesenan dan Penguatkuasaan)

=== Units ===
- Internal Audit (Audit Dalam)
- Law (Undang-undang)
- One Stop Centre (Pusat Sehenti)
- Public Relations (Perhubungan Awam)

=== Administrative areas (zones) ===
As of 2025, Mersing town is divided into 24 zones represented by 24 councillors to act as mediators between residents and the district council. The councillors for the 1 April 2024 to 31 December 2025 session are as below:

Zone	Councillor	Political affiliation
Jemaluang Kiri	Ng See Sian	MCA
Jemaluang Kanan	Ngiau Wei Chen	MCA
Taman Sri Pantai	Rina Farhana Abdullah	UMNO
Taman Wawasan 1	Mohd Haidil Yusof	UMNO
Taman Wawasan 2	Nor Janah Jamaian	UMNO
Taman Sri Mersing	Abdul Razak Abd Majid	UMNO
Taman Sri Nakhoda	Md Hodari Abu Rahim	UMNO
Mersing Kechil	Krishnan Balasebaramaniam	MIC
Taman Mersing	Ayathura Arumugam	MIC
Taman Sri Daik	Mahmood Dolmat	UMNO
Bandar	Wong Kam Nam	MCA
Mersing Kanan	Mohd Rasul Kushairi Mohd Mustapha	UMNO
Taman Pantai Timur	Jamaliah Muhamed	UMNO
Taman Air Merah	Rufiah Shawal	UMNO
Sri Lalang	Mohd Salleh A Rahman	UMNO
Taman Intan	Azhar Zainal Abidin	UMNO
Pulau	Sheikh Zulkifli Sheikh Abdul Rahim	UMNO
Endau	Eric Ng Khye Loon	MCA
Rumah Murah	Mohd Sofian Hussain	UMNO
Jalan Merlimau	Chew Yuh Ling	MCA
Desa Sri Endau	Kan Pei Ying	MCA
Taman Markisa	Tan Teck Kin	MCA
Taman Fajar	Goh Guo Yong	MCA
Taman Haji Ariffin	Azmi Mahmood	UMNO

== Climate ==
Climate data for Mersing (1991–2020 normals)
Month	Jan	Feb	Mar	Apr	May	Jun	Jul	Aug	Sep	Oct	Nov	Dec	Year
Record high °C (°F)	35.3 (95.5)	33.6 (92.5)	34.8 (94.6)	37.4 (99.3)	38.2 (100.8)	37.0 (98.6)	36.0 (96.8)	36.5 (97.7)	35.7 (96.3)	36.2 (97.2)	34.8 (94.6)	35.3 (95.5)	38.2 (100.8)
Mean daily maximum °C (°F)	29.2 (84.6)	30.0 (86.0)	31.2 (88.2)	32.4 (90.3)	32.8 (91.0)	32.4 (90.3)	31.9 (89.4)	31.9 (89.4)	31.9 (89.4)	31.8 (89.2)	30.6 (87.1)	29.4 (84.9)	31.3 (88.3)
Daily mean °C (°F)	26.4 (79.5)	26.9 (80.4)	27.2 (81.0)	27.4 (81.3)	27.4 (81.3)	27.0 (80.6)	26.6 (79.9)	26.5 (79.7)	26.4 (79.5)	26.5 (79.7)	26.3 (79.3)	26.2 (79.2)	26.7 (80.1)
Mean daily minimum °C (°F)	24.3 (75.7)	24.4 (75.9)	24.0 (75.2)	23.8 (74.8)	23.8 (74.8)	23.6 (74.5)	23.3 (73.9)	23.2 (73.8)	23.1 (73.6)	23.2 (73.8)	23.4 (74.1)	23.8 (74.8)	23.7 (74.7)
Record low °C (°F)	19.3 (66.7)	19.9 (67.8)	20.0 (68.0)	21.6 (70.9)	21.1 (70.0)	21.2 (70.2)	20.2 (68.4)	20.8 (69.4)	20.9 (69.6)	21.0 (69.8)	21.4 (70.5)	21.0 (69.8)	19.3 (66.7)
Average precipitation mm (inches)	363.6 (14.31)	130.4 (5.13)	135.9 (5.35)	111.4 (4.39)	140.0 (5.51)	138.2 (5.44)	163.6 (6.44)	168.4 (6.63)	156.8 (6.17)	191.6 (7.54)	315.5 (12.42)	532.9 (20.98)	2,548.2 (100.32)
Average precipitation days (≥ 1.0 mm)	12.9	6.3	8.4	8.6	10.8	10.8	11.8	12.5	10.9	12.9	18.7	18.6	146.6
Mean monthly sunshine hours	169.6	200.4	229.8	211.5	222.8	200.6	199.1	193.7	175.7	175.8	142.5	129.0	2,250.5
Source 1: World Meteorological Organization
Source 2: NOAA

== Culture ==
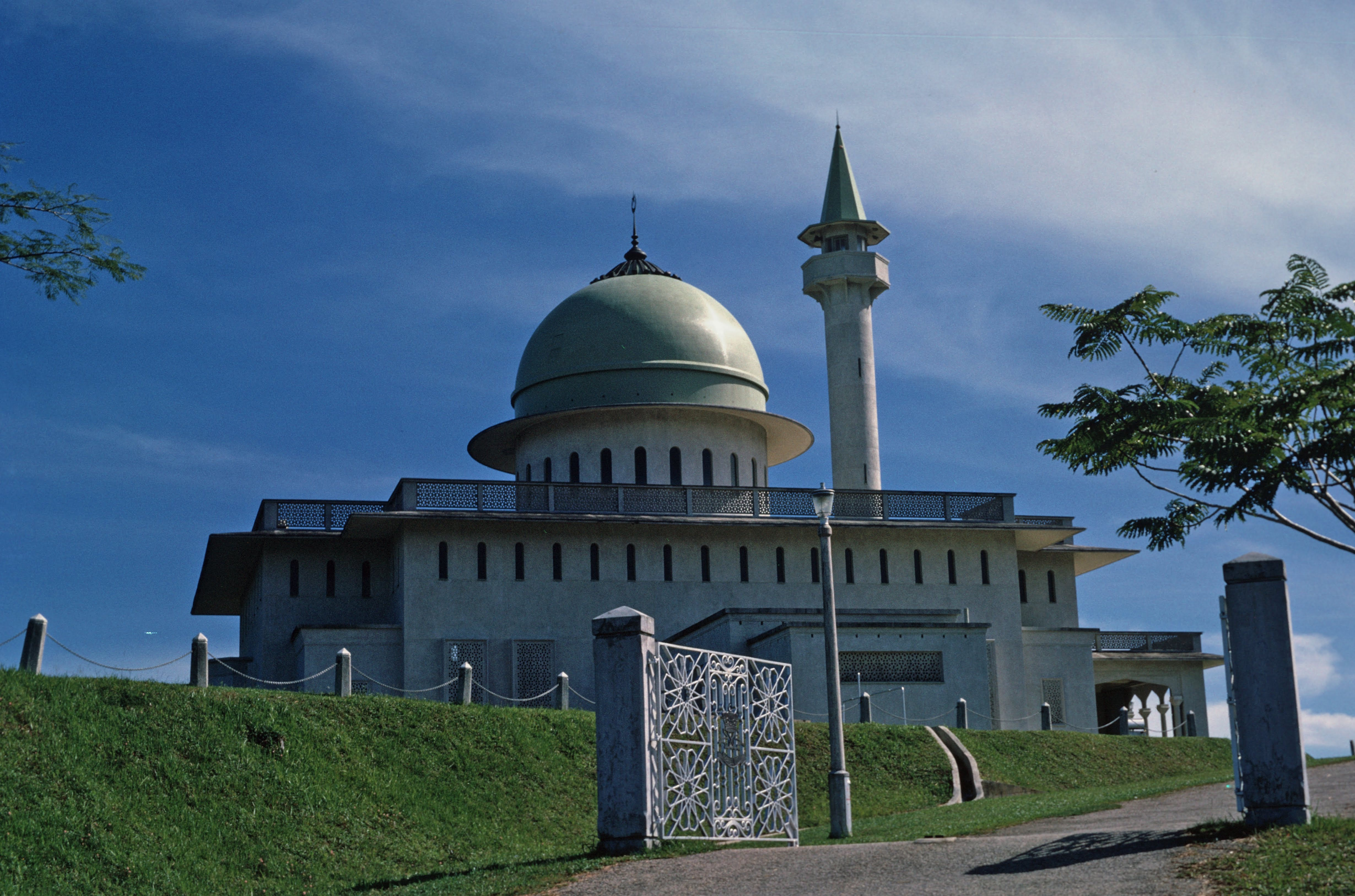
Masjid Bandar mosque

The Malays of Mersing are unique compared to the rest of Johor is that many of them are of Terengganu ancestry, this are proven by the Keropok Lekor industries which is popular in the town and many still speak Terengganu Malay along with the Johor dialect of Malay.

The Chinese community in Mersing mainly belongs to the Cantonese dialect group and speak Cantonese, however, many locals, especially business owners have no issue conversing in Mandarin.

== Transportation ==
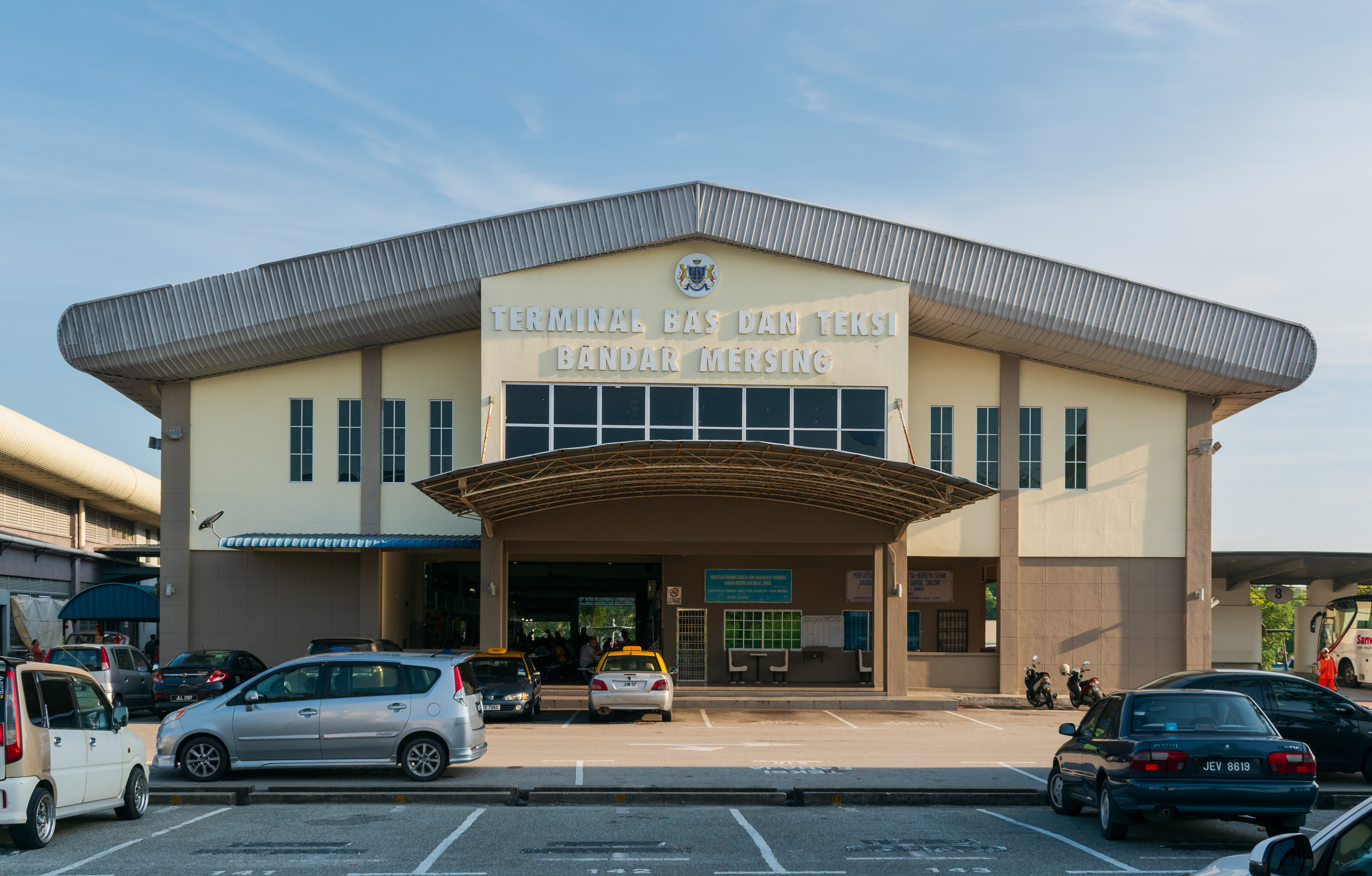
Mersing Bus & Taxi Terminal

=== Car ===
Being located along Federal Route 3, Mersing is relatively accessible for a town its size. Northward this highway goes to Kuantan, Kuala Terengganu and Kota Bharu before terminating at Rantau Panjang at the border with Thailand. Southwards highway 3 goes to Jemaluang and Kota Tinggi and terminates at Johor Bahru, the state capital. Jalan Felda Nitar connects Felda Nitar, Kluang, Ayer Hitam and Batu Pahat, also connects to North–South Expressway Southern Route via Ayer Hitam Interchange to Kuala Lumpur.

=== Bus ===
Mersing Bus and Taxi Terminal (Malay: Terminal Bas dan Teksi Bandar Mersing) on Jalan Tepian Sungai is served by various companies including Transnasional and Causeway Link. Long-distance services are offered to most major cities in peninsular Malaysia such as Kuala Lumpur, Ipoh and Malacca, as well as local buses to towns and cities around Johor state.

=== Water ===
Mersing port in the mouth of Mersing River is also the main port for ferries to Tioman Island and the more than 40 other islands in the Seribuat Archipelago.
