= Skudai–Pontian Highway =

Road in Malaysia

Federal Route 5
- Skudai–Pontian Highway

Route information
- Maintained by Malaysian Public Works Department
- Length: 45 km (28 mi)
- Existed: 1983–present
- History: Completed in 1985

Major junctions
- West end: Pontian Kechil
- FT 5 Federal Route 5 FT 95 Federal Route 95; Jalan Rimba Terjun; Jalan Gunung Pulai; Jalan Sungai Pulai; J7 State Route J7; Jalan Kangkar Pulai; FT 1 Skudai Highway
- East end: Skudai

Location
- Country: Malaysia
- Primary destinations: Tanjung Piai, Kukup, Pekan Nenas, Gelang Patah, Ulu Choh, Kangkar Pulai, Senai, Kulai, Johor Bahru

Highway system
- Highways in Malaysia; Expressways; Federal; State

Skudai–Pontian Highway, Federal Route 5, is a highway in Johor, Malaysia that connects Skudai in Johor Bahru District in the east with the town of Pontian Kechil in Pontian District in the west. It is also known as Jalan Pontian (at Johor Bahru district side) and Jalan Johor (at Pontian district side). It is one of the only two federal roads that are paved with concrete (from Universiti Teknologi Malaysia interchange to Taman Sri Pulai junction) besides Jalan Batak Rabit–Sitiawan (also part of Federal Route 5 while other federal roads are paved with typical tarmac.

== Junction and towns lists ==
The entire route is located in Johor.

Legend:

- I/C - Interchange, I/S - Intersection, RSA - Rest and service area, OBR - Overhead bridge restaurant, R/R - Restaurant and rest plaza, L/B - Layby, V/P - Vista point, TN - tunnel, T/P - Toll plaza, BR - Bridge
- C - Cloverleaf, S - Stack, T-A - Trumpet-A, T-B - Trumpet-B, DT - Directional-T/Y, SDT - Semi-Directional-T/Y, P-Y - Partial-Y, D - Diamond, P-C - Partial cloverleaf, D-D - Diverging diamond, D-R - Direct ramp

District	km	Exit	Name	Destinations	Lane	Notes
Pontian		I/S	Pontian Kechil; Pontian Trade Centre I/S	FT 5 Jalan Alsagoff – Malacca, Muar, Batu Pahat, Benut, Pontian Besar; Jalan Delima – Pontian Trade Centre; FT 95 Jalan Kukup – Kukup, Tanjung Piai, Kukup Golf Resort	Double Four	Junctions
Pontian			Pontian-WCE	West Coast Expressway	Double Four	Under planning
Pontian		I/S	Jalan Perpat Timbul I/S	J169 Jalan Perpat Timbul – Tenggayun, Parit Stan, Rimba Terjun, Kukup, Tanjung Piai, Kukup Golf Resort	Two or Super Four	T-junctions
Pontian		I/S	Jalan Parit Selangor I/S	J116 Jalan Parit Selangor – Kampung Parit Selangor	Two or Super Four	Junctions
Pontian		I/S	Pekan Nenas; Jalan Pekan Nenas Utara I/S	J113 Jalan Pekan Nenas Utara – Kampung Seri Menanti, Kulai, Gunung Pulai, Kem Bina Negara	Two or Super Four	T-junctions
Pontian			Pekan Nenas		Two or Super Four	
Pontian			Pineapple can factory		Two or Super Four	T-junctions
Pontian		I/S	Jalan Sungai Pulai I/S	J46 Jalan Sungai Pulai – Kampung Sungai Pulai	Double Four	T-junctions
Pontian			Pekan Nanas-WCE	West Coast Expressway	Double Four	Under planning
Pontian			Pekan Nenas temporary illegal immigrants depot facilities		Double Four	T-junctions
Pontian		BR	Sungai Jeram Choh bridge		Two or Super Four	
Pontian		I/S	Ulu Choh South I/S	J7 Johor State Route J7 – Ulu Choh, Gelang Patah, Bandar Nusajaya, Tanjung Kupang, Port Tanjung Pelepas, Pendas Second Link Expressway / AH143 – Kuala Lumpur, Senai International Airport, Pasir Gudang, Johor Bahru, Tuas (Singapore)	Two or Super Four	Junctions
Johor Bahru		I/S	Ulu Choh East I/S	Jalan Pekan Ulu Choh – Ulu Choh	Two or Super Four	T-junctions
Johor Bahru		BR	Sungai Pulai bridge		Two or Super Four	
Johor Bahru			Public Utilities Board (PUB) Singapore Gunung Pulai reservoir		Two or Super Four	T-junctions
Johor Bahru		I/S	Kangkar Pulai I/S	Jalan Kangkar Pulai – Kangkar Pulai	Double Four	T-junctions
Johor Bahru		I/S	Pulai Perdana I/S	Jalan Teratai – Taman Teratai; Persiaran Pulai Perdana – Taman Sri Pulai Perdana	Double Four	T-junctions
Johor Bahru		BR	Sungai Melana bridge		Double Four	
Johor Bahru		I/S	Taman Sri Pulai I/S	Jalan Sri Pulai – Taman Sri Pulai; Persiaran Pulai Perdana – Taman Sri Pulai Perdana	Double Four	Junctions
Johor Bahru		I/C	University of Technology Malaysia I/C	Jalan Universiti – University of Technology Malaysia (UTM), Taman Universiti, AEON Taman Universiti	Double Four	Parclo A4 interchange
Johor Bahru			U-Turn	U-Turn – Pontian, Pekan Nanas, Ulu Choh	Double Four	Eastbound
Johor Bahru			U-Turn	U-Turn – Kulai, Senai, Skudai, Johor Bahru	Double Four	Westbound
Johor Bahru		I/S	Desa Skudai I/S	Jalan Sejahtera 1 – Desa Skudai	Double Four	LILO; Westbound
Johor Bahru		I/S	Jalan Ladang I/S	Jalan Ladang – University of Technology Malaysia	Double Four	LILO; Eastbound
Johor Bahru		L/B	Shell and McDonald's L/B	Shell and McDonald's L/B – Shell Petronas McDonald's Burger King	Double Four	Eastbound
Johor Bahru		I/S	Taman Sri Skudai I/S	Jalan Tembaga – Taman Sri Skudai	Double Four	LILO; Westbound
Johor Bahru	0.0	I/C	Skudai; Skudai North I/C	FT 1 Skudai Highway – Kulai, Senai, Senai International Airport, Skudai, City centre, Woodlands (Singapore); North–South Expressway Southern Route / AH2 – Kuala Lumpur, Malacca, Woodlands (Singapore); Senai–Desaru Expressway – Ulu Tiram, Kota Tinggi, Pasir Gudang, Desaru; Persiaran Impian Emas – Taman Impian Emas	Double Four	Trumpet interchange with U-turn
