= Malaysia Federal Route 95 =

Road in Malaysia

Federal Route 95
- Jalan Kukup

Route information
- Maintained by Malaysian Public Works Department
- Length: 19.8 km (12.3 mi)

Major junctions
- North end: Pontian Kechil
- FT 5 Federal Route 5 FT 5 Skudai–Pontian Highway; J114 Jalan Tenggayun; J110 Jalan Peradin; J111 Jalan Serkat
- South end: Kukup

Location
- Country: Malaysia
- Primary destinations: Rimba Terjun, Permas Kechil, Tanjung Piai

Highway system
- Highways in Malaysia; Expressways; Federal; State

Federal Route 95, or Jalan Kukup, is a federal road in Johor, Malaysia, connecting Pontian Kechil to the fishing town of Kukup. It is also a main route to Tanjung Piai.

== Route background ==
The Kilometre Zero of the Federal Route 95 starts at Kukup.

== Features ==
At most sections, the Federal Route 95 was built under the JKR R5 road standard, allowing maximum speed limit of up to 90 km/h.

== Junction and town lists ==
The entire route is located in Pontian District, Johor.

Legend:

- I/C - Interchange, I/S - Intersection, RSA - Rest and service area, OBR - Overhead bridge restaurant, R/R - Restaurant and rest plaza, L/B - Layby, V/P - Vista point, TN - tunnel, T/P - Toll plaza, BR - Bridge
- C - Cloverleaf, S - Stack, T-A - Trumpet-A, T-B - Trumpet-B, DT - Directional-T/Y, SDT - Semi-Directional-T/Y, P-Y - Partial-Y, D - Diamond, P-C - Partial cloverleaf, D-D - Diverging diamond, D-R - Direct ramp

Location	km	mi	Name	Destinations	Notes
Pontian Kechil	19.8	12.3	Pontian Kechil	FT 5 Jalan Alsagoff – Pontian Besar, Benut, Batu Pahat, Muar, Malacca; FT 5 Skudai–Pontian Highway – Pekan Nanas, Skudai, Senai, Kulai, Johor Bahru, Gelang Patah; Jalan Delima – Pontian Trade Centre	Junctions
Pontian Kechil	19.5	12.1	Kampung Tengah		
Pontian Kechil	19.0	11.8	–		
Pontian Kechil			Taman Rimba Jaya		
Pontian Kechil			Rimba Terjun		
Pontian Kechil			Parit Tegong	J114 Jalan Tenggayun – Tenggayun, Parit Stan, Pekan Nenas	T-junctions
Rambah			Taman Rambah		
Rambah			Rambah		
Rambah			Kampung Rambah		
Rambah			Sungai Rambah bridge		
Rambah			Jalan Parit Bilal Darat	Jalan – Kampung Parit Bilal	T-junctions
Teluk Kerang			Kampung Teluk Kerang		
Teluk Kerang			Teluk Kerang	J110 Jalan Peradin – Peradin	T-junctions
Teluk Kerang			Kampung Timor Raya		
Teluk Kerang			Kampung Timor Laut		
Penerok			Kampung Bugis Batu Enam		
Penerok			Penerok	Kampung Penerok Ulu	
Penerok			Kampung Penerok		
Kukup			Kampung Sungai Buntu	Kampung Jakon	
Kukup			Kukup Golf Resort	Kukup Golf Resort	T-junctions
Kukup			Kampung Air Masin		
Kukup			Sungai Permas bridge		
Kukup			Kampung Permas Besar		
Kukup			Kampung Permas Kechil		
Kukup			Bandar Permas	J47 Jalan Permas–Chokoh – Chokoh, Serkat, Tanjung Piai	T-junctions
Kukup	0.0	0.0	Kukup	Kukup – Kukup Ferry Terminal (Ferry to Dumai, Palembang and Tanjung Balai, Indonesia), Kukup Seafood Restaurant	
1.000 mi = 1.609 km; 1.000 km = 0.621 mi
