= Agriculture in Malaysia =

Agriculture in Malaysia makes up twelve percent of the nation's GDP. Sixteen percent of the population of Malaysia is employed through some sort of agriculture. Large-scale plantations were established by the British. These opened opportunity for new crops such as rubber (1876), palm oil (1917), and cocoa (1950). A number of crops are grown for domestic purpose such as bananas, coconuts, durian, pineapples, rice and rambutan.

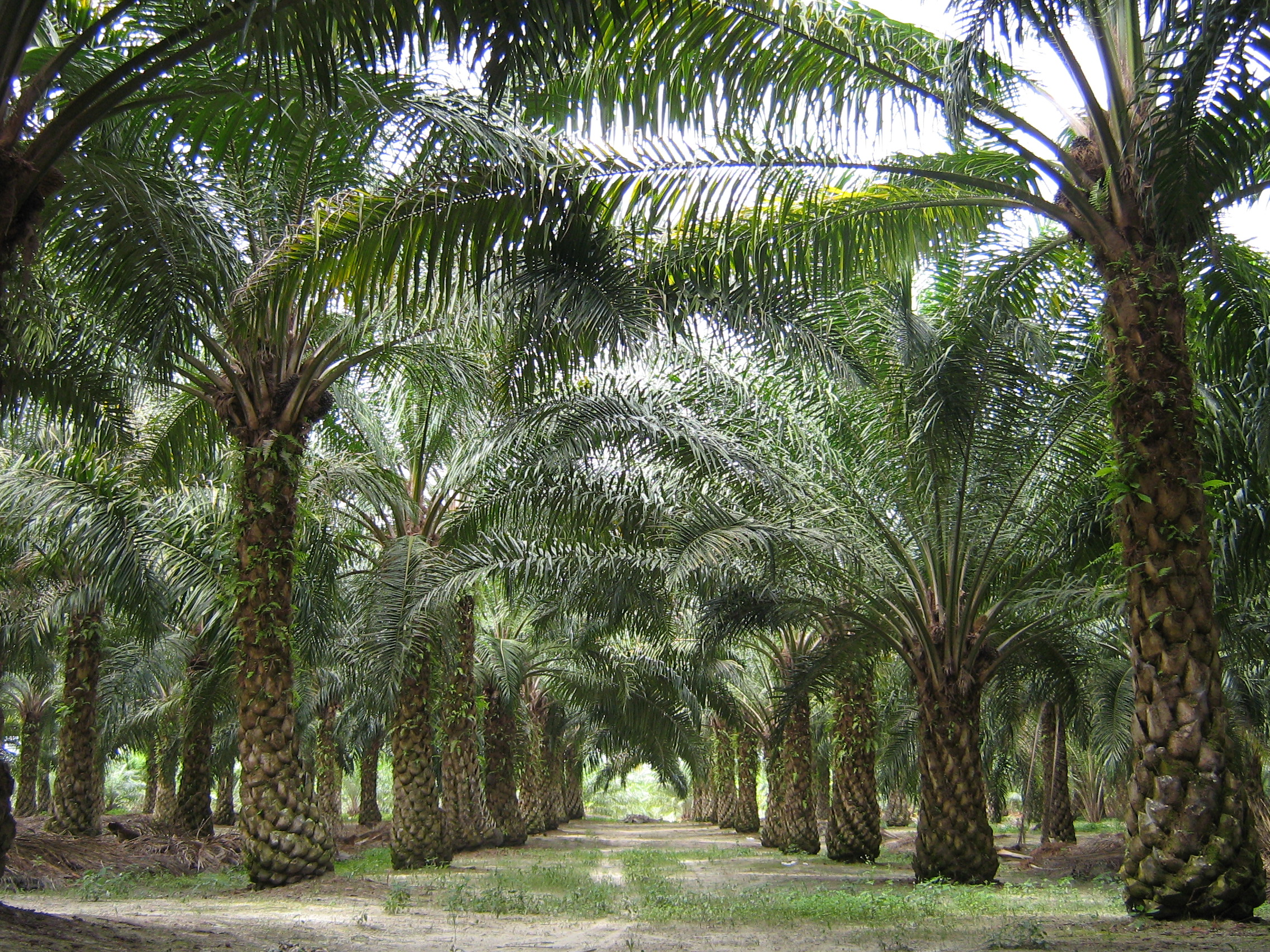
Palm oil cultivation is a significant cause of deforestation in Malaysia.

== Climate ==
The climate of Malaysia produces the proper conditions for the production of exotic produce. It is located on a peninsula in Southeast Asia. This area is very rarely affected by hurricanes or drought. Malaysia maintains a humidity level around ninety percent because of its location close to the equator. The weather stays hot and humid all year round.

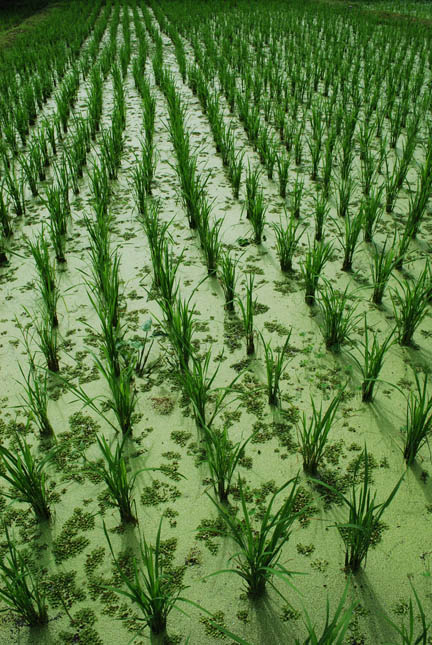
LAMAN PADI (Rice)

=== Effects of climate change ===
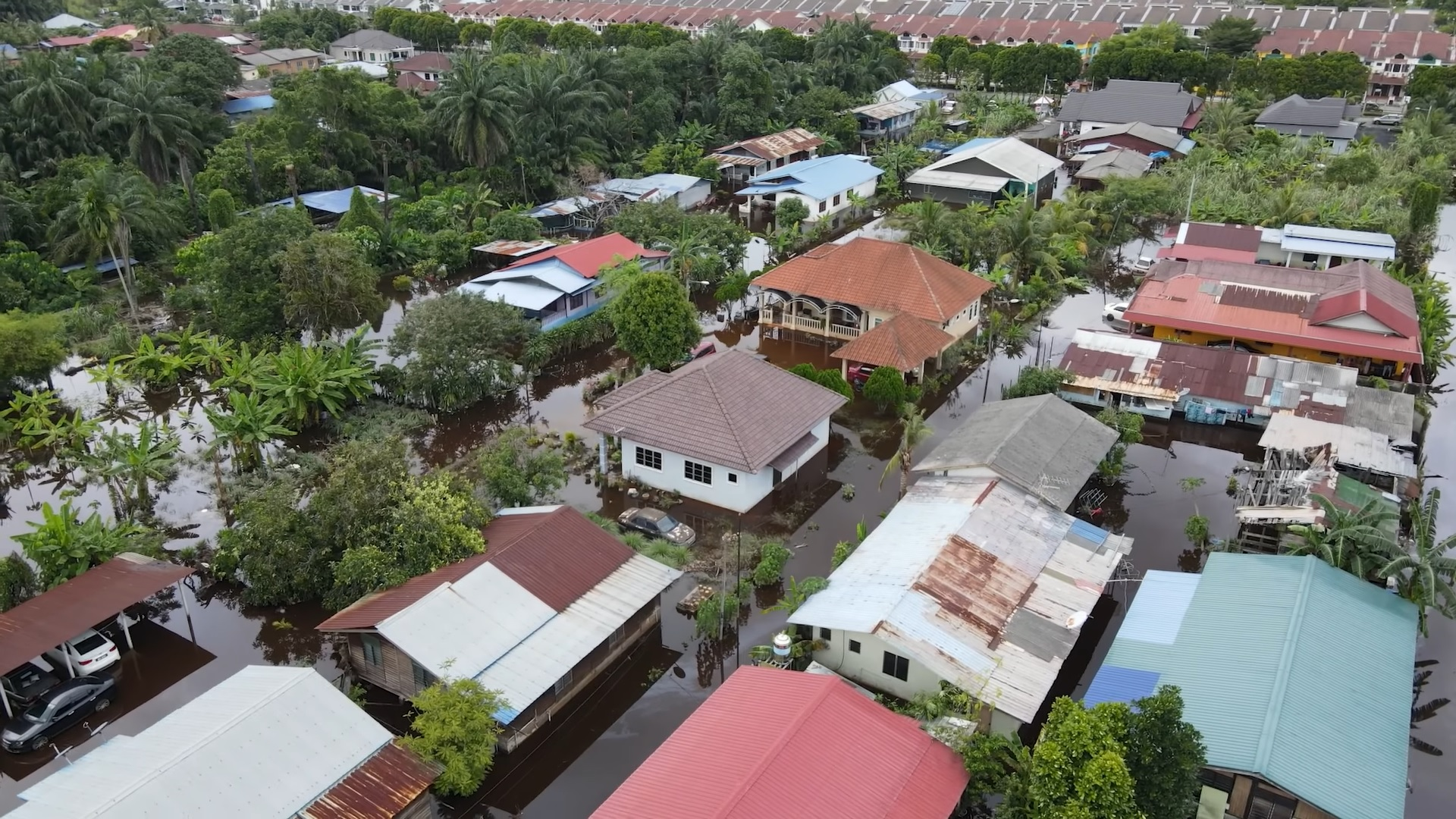
Major floods in December 2021 were linked to climate change by several experts.

Agriculture is further threatened by droughts and floods. Rice yields may decline by 60%. Other potentially impacted products include rubber, palm oil, and cocoa. Annual drought probability, which currently lies at 4%, may increase to 9%. Such probability varies by locality, being most likely in Sabah. Overall, precipitation changes will have a more significant impact on agriculture than temperature changes.

Warming seas and changing weather patterns are affecting fish stocks and making fishing more dangerous. Communities most exposed to the impact of climate change are poorer, including those involved in manual labour, agriculture, and fisheries. The impacts of climate change are thus expected to reinforce existing inequality, both in impact and in the ability to adapt.

== Ministry of Agriculture and Food Security, Malaysia ==
This ministry is also known as the Kementerian Pertanian & Keterjaminan Makanan Malaysia. The ministry serves as an agency for private agricultural businesses to get advised by experts that specialise in agriculture, fishing, and livestock. The ministry plans the policies, strategies, and different development programs. It monitors, surveys, directs, and puts into action the projects given by the Integrated Agricultural Development Project (IADP). The ministry has services such as collecting, analysing and restoring information and agricultural data through science and providing the report to farmers. It provides references and agricultural management systems for plantation owners to access all collected agriculture information.

== Rice production and consumption ==
Rice is a crucial part of everyday Malaysian diet. In 1998, Malaysia produced 1.94 million metric tons of rice. Even with this high production, Malaysia still only produces eighty percent of what it needs to support itself and must import the rest. The average Malaysian citizen consumes 82.3 kilograms of rice per year. The increasing population calls for more research and technological advancement to increase rice production for consumption within the nation.

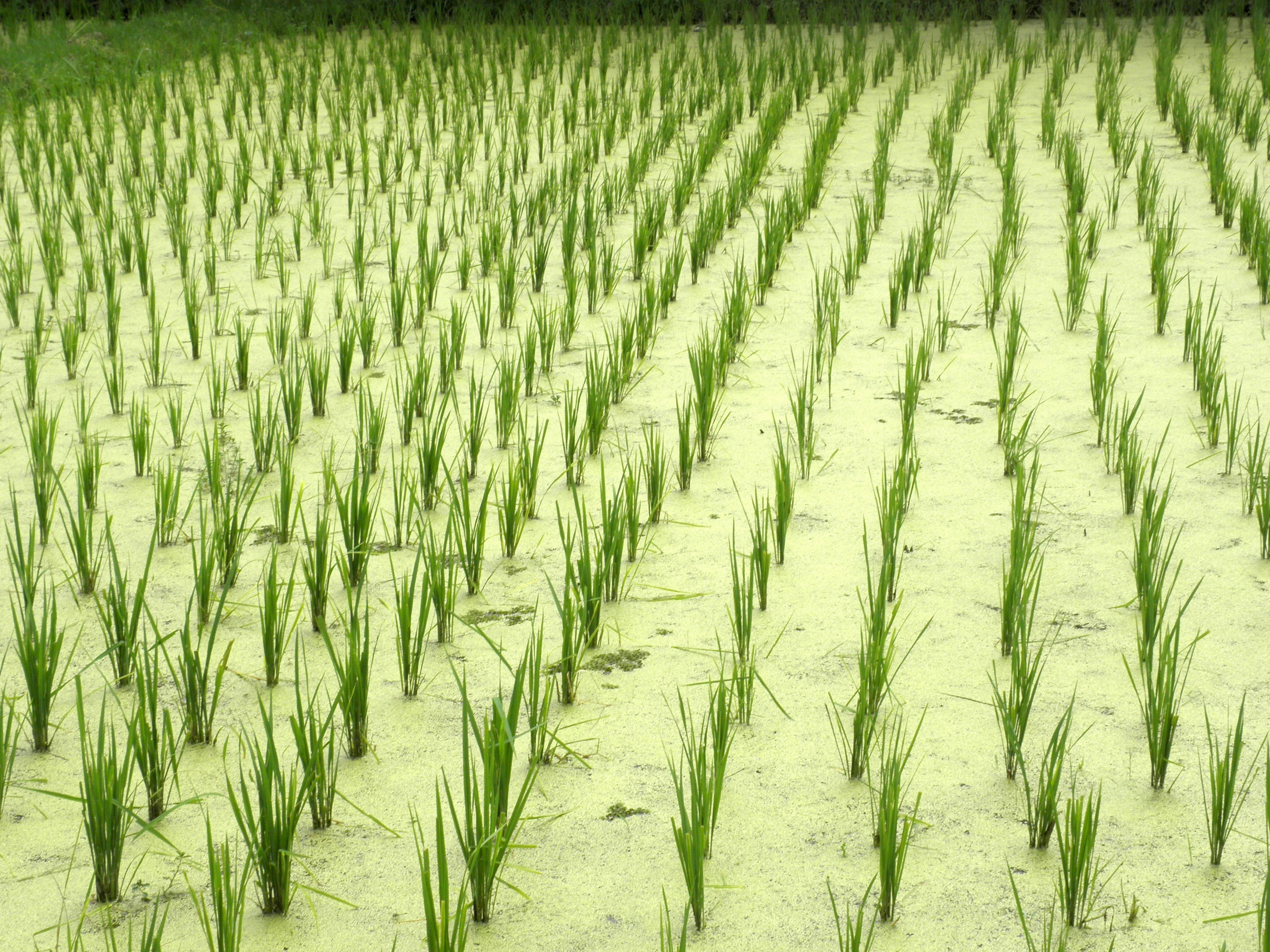
Langkawi-Pantai Cenang Rice Field

Year	Population(x1000)	Consumption (tons)	Planted (ha)
2008	27958.95	2305391.38	674548
2009	28614.30	2358864.89	674548
2010	29281.54	2413398.24	674548
2011	29961.00	2469006.04	674548
2012	30653.04	2527705.82	674548
2013	31358.01	2583517.73	674548
2014	32076.27	2642464.27	674548
2015	32808.21	2702570.04	674548
2016	33554.21	2763861.61	674548
2017	34314.67	2826367.32	674548
2018	35090.01	2890117.22	674548
2019	35880.64	2955142.90	674548
2020	36687.01	3021477.51	674548
2021	37509.55	3089155.60	674548
2022	38348.73	3158213.17	674548
2023	39205.02	3228687.59	674548
2024	40078.90	3300617.58	674548
2025	40970.88	3374043.22	674548
2026	41881.47	3449005.93	674548
2027	42811.20	3525548.50	674548
2028	43760.61	3603715.06	674548
2029	44730.26	3683551.13	674548
2030	45720.72	3765103.62	674548

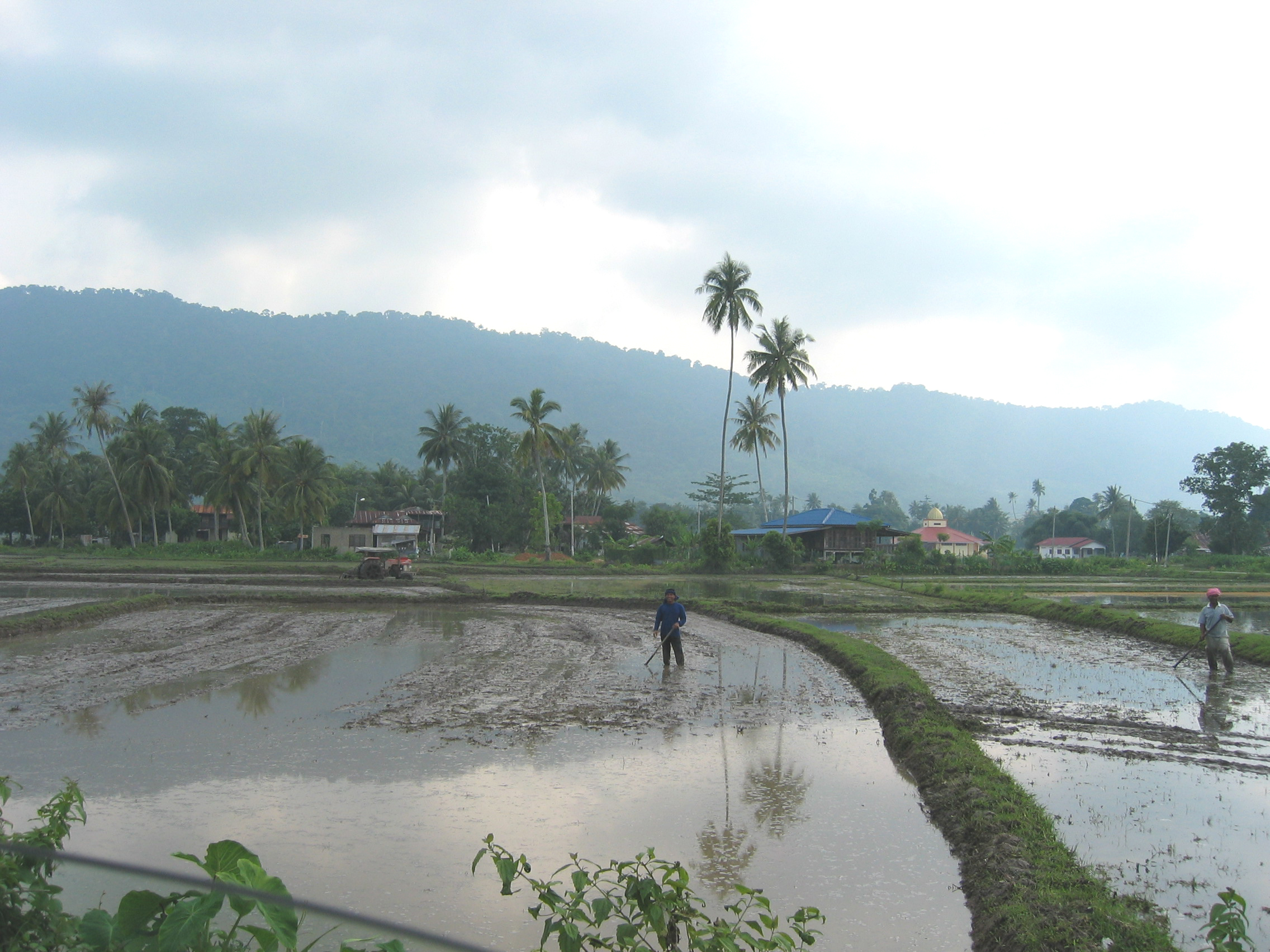
Langkawi Paddy Fields (rice)

== Statistics ==
Nearly twenty four percent of Malaysia's land area is composed of land dedicated to agriculture alone. There are around 43,000 different agricultural machines and tractors. Malaysia contains 7,605,000 hectares of arable and permanent cropland. Malaysia produces 535,000 metric tons of bananas per year. Only about five percent of Malaysia's cropland is actually irrigated. This chart displays a predicted relationship between consumption of rice, the amount planted, and the increase in population from 2008 up until 2030.

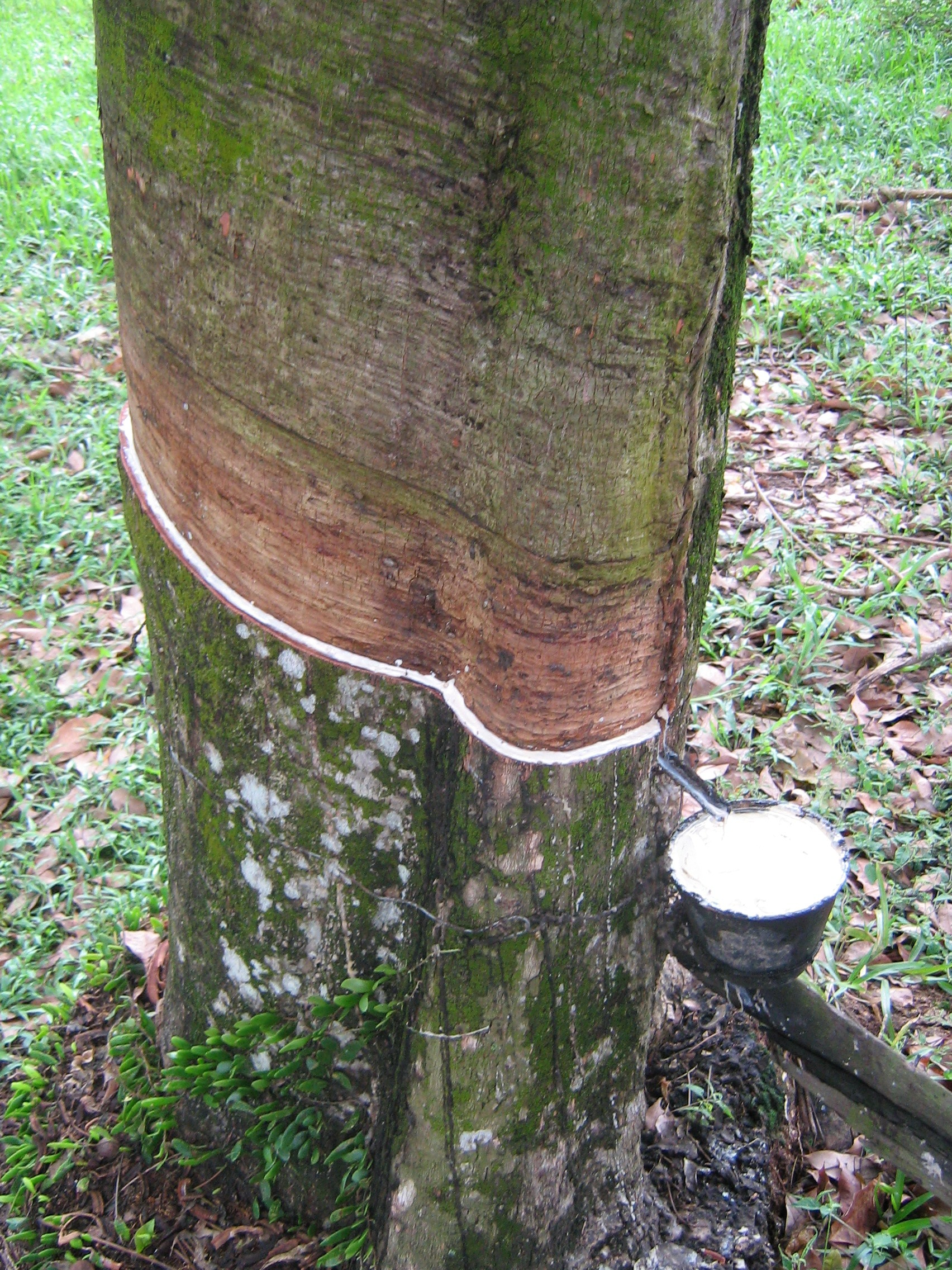
Rubber Tree, Malaysia

== Rubber production ==
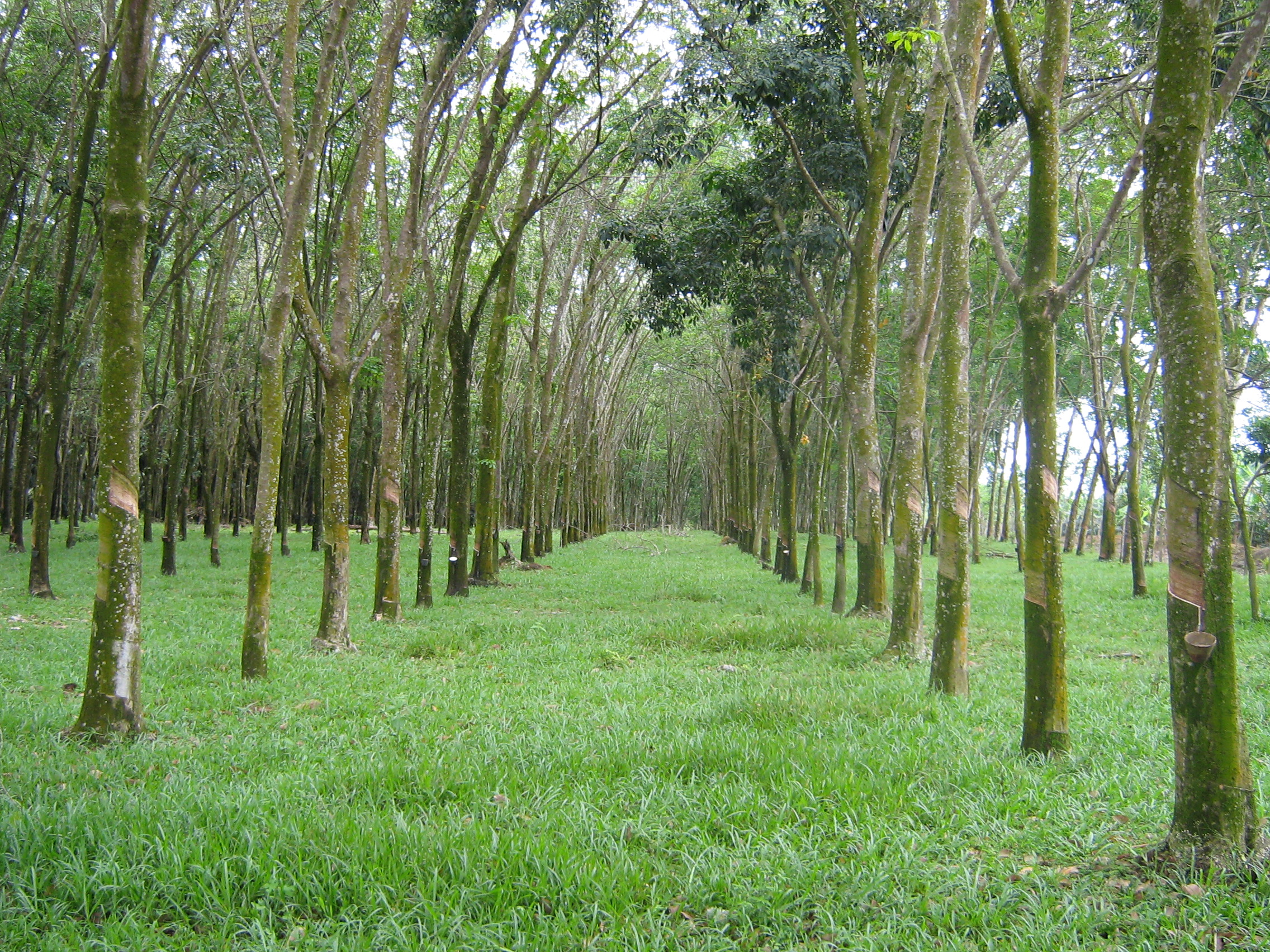
Rubber Tree Farm, Malaysia

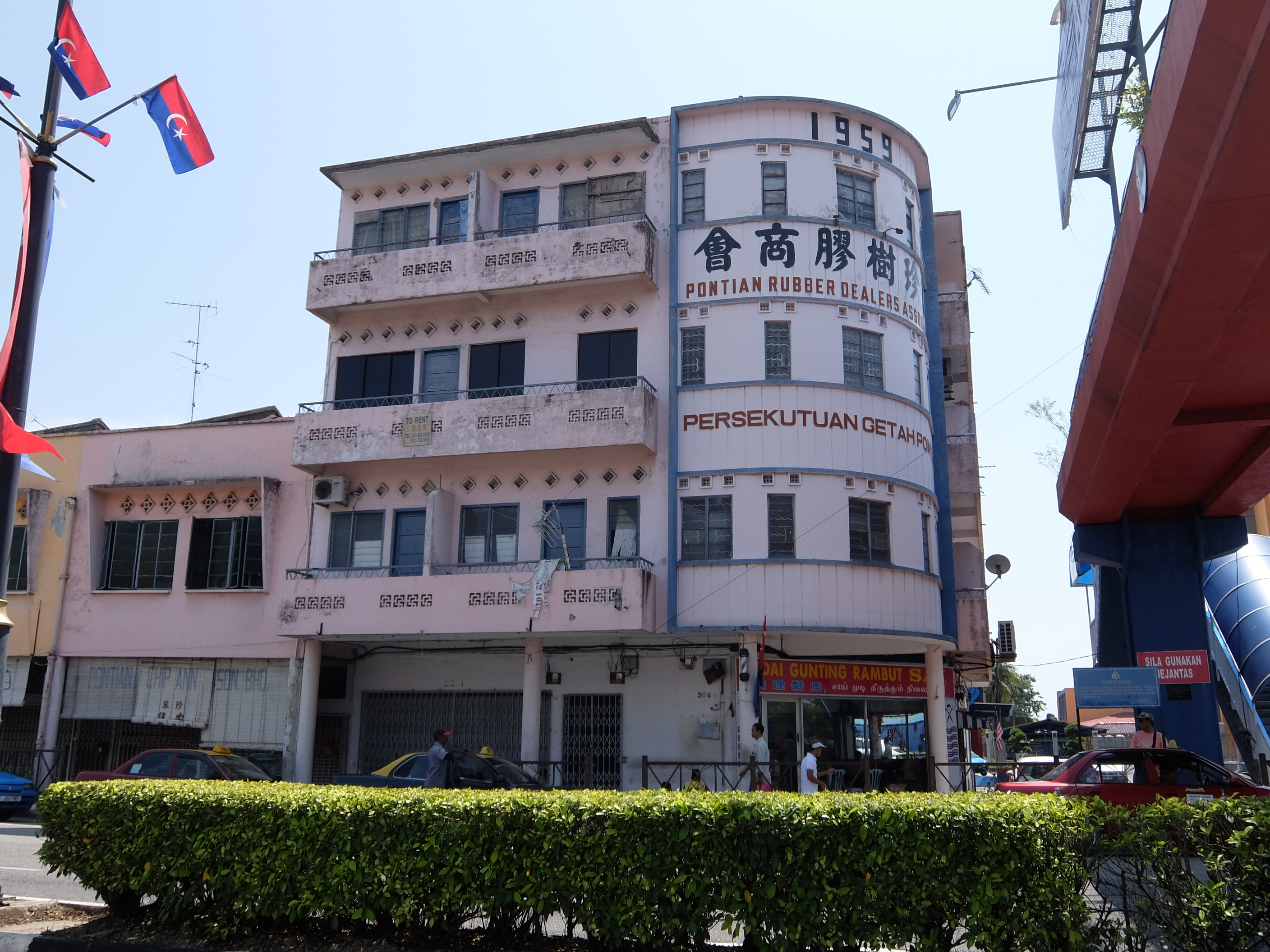
A rubber dealer association office in Pontian Kechil, Johor.

Rubber trees were first planted in British Malaya in 1876. The first commercial rubber planting was in 1896. In 1903, 20,000 acres were dedicated to rubber production in Malaya. By 1922, this number had risen to 2,260,000 acres. Two political restrictions on rubber production – the Stevenson Plan (1922-1928) and the International Rubber Regulation Agreement (1934-1942) – harmed the Malayan economy over the long run, as the rubber restrictions were most stringently enforced there.

Malaysia was formerly responsible for one third of the world's rubber exports. However, production has decreased across most states. Between 2001 and 2008, production value rose, hitting 11.24 billion dollars. In 2009 however, production plummeted by nearly six percent, as growers switched to a more profitable product, palm oil.

Malaysia has earned a good reputation around the world for its high quality and well priced rubber products. Rubber manufacturers in Malaysia supply several rubber products such as medical gloves, components for automobiles, belts, and hoses to several countries such as the United States, Japan, China, and many countries in Europe.

As of 2019, Malaysia ranks as the sixth largest producer and exporter of Natural Rubber, and is a leading producer of rubber products. It is also the largest consumer of natural rubber and the world's largest rubber gloves producer. In 2020, Malaysia's annual rubber gloves exports were valued at US$7.3 billion (RM29.8 billion).

The COVID-19 pandemic led to an increased demand for rubber gloves, reporting an annual growth of 12% year over year. However, an outbreak at top glove factories on 25 November 2020 had a negative effect on their trade.

Malaysia contributes to 46 percent of total rubber production in the world and produces about 1-5 million tons of rubber annually. The production of rubber has declined from the 1990s, when it used to be 615,222 tonnes.

Rubber manufacturers in Malaysia include local smallholders, plantations, multinationals and joint ventures with the United States, Europe, and Japan. Malaysia has a total rubber area of 1.07 million hectares, out of which 7.21 percent is owned by plantation companies. Ninety percent of production is accounted by smallholders who generally hold less than 40 acres of agricultural land. These statistics remain a major concern for the industry as these smallholders tend to move to other economic activities when the rubber price goes down.

The R&D infrastructure developed by Rubber Research Institute of Malaysia and Malaysian Rubber Board has made significant contributions and serves as a comprehensive R&D set up for a single commodity. Malaysia also produces specialty rubber such as the epoxidized natural rubber (Ekoprena) and deproteinized natural rubber (Pureprena) that can be used in green tires and engineering products. It was made to capitalize on the growing preference for natural and renewable materials.

Rubber grades supplied by Malaysia include:

- SMR - Standard Malaysian Rubber
- ENR, DPNR, and TPENR
- Low Protein Latex

== Other products ==
Malaysia is also an exporter of timber, pepper, and tobacco.

== Tourism ==
Agriculture-related tourism in Malaysia are:

- Agricultural Museum
- Pineapple Museum
