= Pineapple Museum =

Museum in Pontian, Johor, Malaysia

- Muzium Nanas
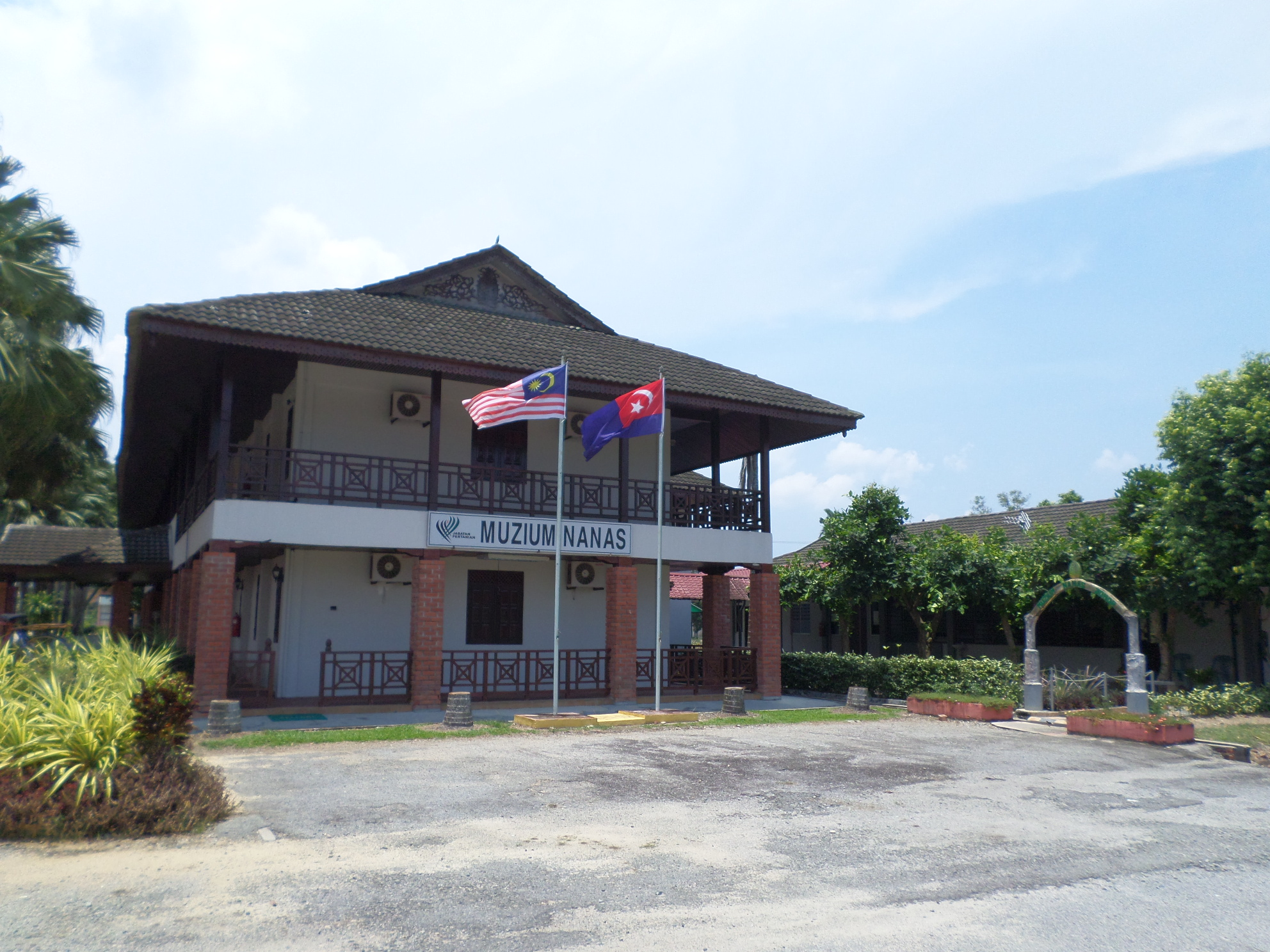
- Established: 21 May 2002
- Location: Pontian, Johor, Malaysia
- Coordinates: 1°30′25.4″N 103°26′49.0″E
- Type: museum

The Pineapple Museum (Malay: Muzium Nanas) is a museum dedicated to Pineapple plantation and processing industry which is located in Pekan Nanas, Pontian District, Johor, Malaysia. It was inaugurated by Johor Chief Minister Abdul Ghani Othman on 21 May 2002. Formerly under the Agricultural Department, the management of the museum was transferred to the Malaysian Pineapple Industry Board in March 2021. The museum exhibits collections, history and information on pineapple plantation industry, as well as products and tools for pineapple processing.

== See also ==
- List of museums in Malaysia
- Agriculture in Malaysia
