= Ayer Masin =

Mukim in Pontian, Johor, Malaysia

- Mukim
- Ayer Masin in Pontian District
- Coordinates: 1°20′30.7″N 103°26′58.4″E
- Country: Malaysia
- State: Johor
- District: Pontian

Area
  - Total: 44 km^{2} (17 sq mi)

Ayer Masin is a mukim in Pontian District, Johor, Malaysia.

== Geography ==
The mukim spans over an area of 44 km^{2}.

== See also ==
- Geography of Malaysia
