= Malaysian Rubber Board =

Malaysian government agency for natural rubber

- Lembaga Getah Malaysia

Agency overview
- Formed: 1 January 1998; 27 years ago
- Jurisdiction: Government of Malaysia
- Headquarters: 18th Floor Bangunan Getah Asli (Menara) 148 Jalan Ampang 50450 Kuala Lumpur, Malaysia.
- Minister responsible: Johari Abdul Ghani, Minister of Plantation and Commodities
- Deputy Minister responsible: Chan Foong Hin, Deputy Minister of Plantation and Commodities
- Agency executives: Zairossani Mohd Nor, Director General; Mok Kok Lang, Deputy Director General (Research & Innovation); Wan Ahmad Asmady bin Wan Md Din, Deputy Director General (Policy & Operations)
- Parent ministry: Ministry of Plantation and Commodities
- Key document: Malaysian Rubber Board (Incorporation) Act 1996
- Website: lgm.gov.my

The Malaysian Rubber Board (MRB; Malay: Lembaga Getah Malaysia) is the custodian of the rubber industry in Malaysia. Established on 1 January 1998, it has under its fold three agencies (RRIM, MRRDB and MRELB), which are now merged into one. The R&D work in natural rubber, accomplished by the Rubber Research Institute of Malaysia, has been used by the Malaysian natural rubber industry and other NR producing countries.

The objective of MRB is to assist in the development and modernization of the Malaysian rubber industry from cultivation of the rubber tree, the extraction and processing of its raw rubber, the manufacture of rubber products and the marketing of rubber and rubber products.

The Director General of MRB is Dato' Dr Zairossani Mohd Nor.

== See also ==
- Agriculture in Malaysia
- Rubber Research Institute of Malaysia
- Natural rubber
