= Pekan Nanas =

- Township
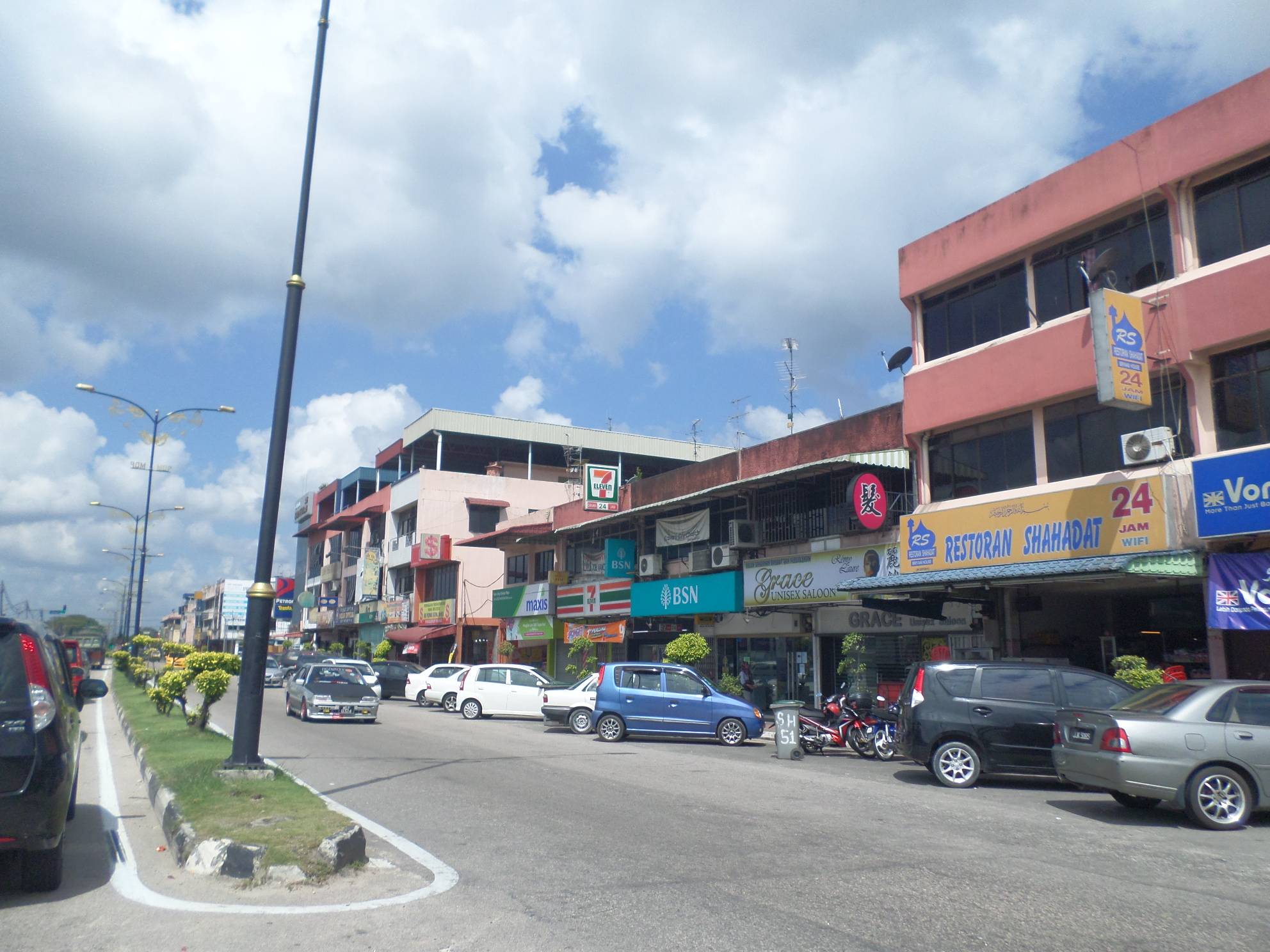
- Interactive map of Pekan Nanas
- Coordinates: 1°30′25.4″N 103°26′49.0″E
- Country: Malaysia
- State: Johor
- District: Pontian
- First settled: 1927

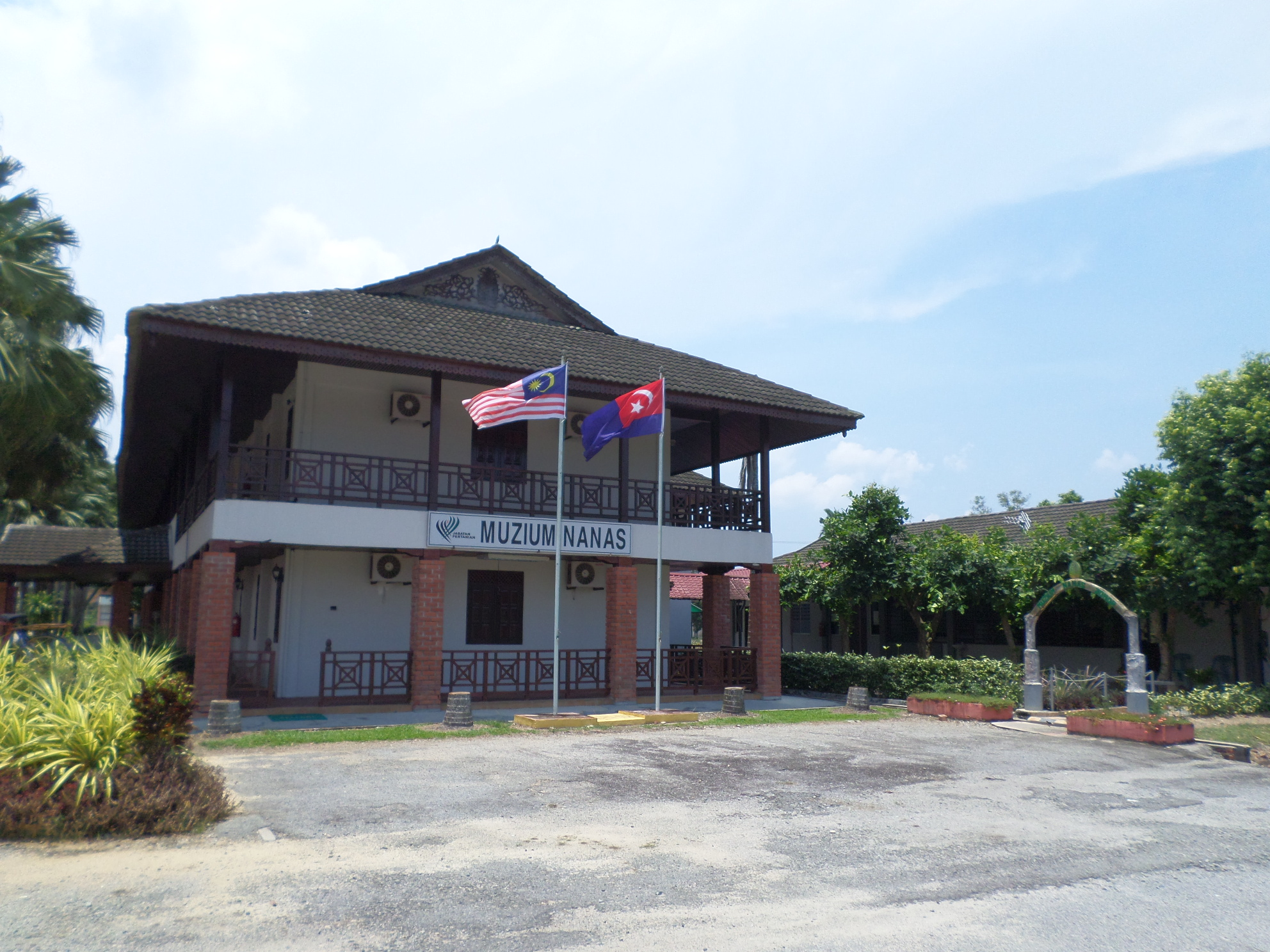
Pineapple Museum

Pekan Nanas (lit. Pineapple Town) is a town located in Pontian District, Johor, Malaysia. It is famous for its pineapple plantation industry and was Malaysia's largest production base for pineapples.

== Etymology ==
Pekan Nanas means "pineapple city" or "pineapple town" in English. Additionally it is also written as Pekan Nenas. The name was given, referring to large plantations of pineapple in this town.

== History ==
Before the town was founded, the town was a road connection from Pontian to Johor Bahru, and much of today's town state was just rubber trees.

Pekan Nanas was founded in 1927 by the Bugis, whose origins lie in South Sulawesi in modern-day Indonesia. It was subsequently named after the town's planned pineapple plantations. Throughout the 20th century, the settlement grew into Malaysia's largest pineapple plantation city.

== Manufacturing and industry ==
The town serves as a significant production site for construction components in neighbouring Singapore. Located roughly 28 kilometres (17 miles) from the city-state, it hosts several large-scale manufacturing facilities by Singaporean companies, including precast factories that produce modules for housing projects, such as those overseen by the Housing and Development Board (HDB), as well as segments for rail infrastructure projects like the Cross Island Line (CRL). This industrial activity has expanded as demand for precast construction components increases.

Beyond construction, it is also production hub for large-scale theatrical sets for Singaporean arts groups. Facilities in the town build structures for various theatrical and entertainment productions, including international co-productions hosted at Singapore's arts venues. In 2025, the Malaysian Ministry of Investment, Trade and Industry (MITI) designated Pekan Nanas as a strategic location within the Johor–Singapore Special Economic Zone (JS–SEZ).

== Tourist attractions ==
- Pineapple Museum
- Sinar Eco Resort is a resort located within the town's Oil Palm Estate.

== Transportation ==
=== Road ===
The Skudai–Pontian Highway passes through the town. The town is accessible by bus from Larkin Sentral (MyBas Johor Bahru - T50) in Johor Bahru.
