= Rubber Research Institute of Malaysia =

Research center in Kuala Lumpur, Malaysia

Coordinates: 3.16085°N 101.73334°E

- Institut Penyelidikan Getah Malaysia
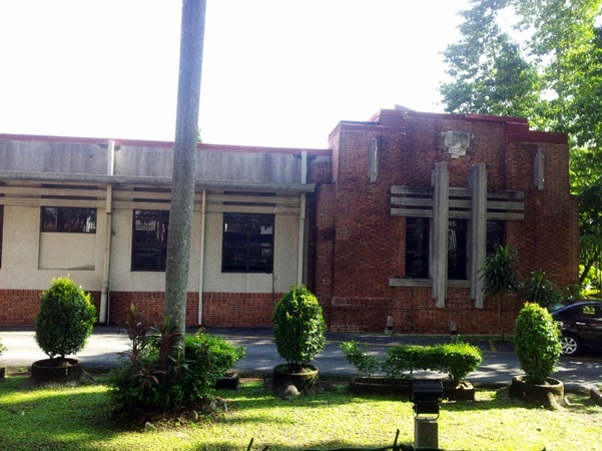

Institute overview
- Formed: 1 September 1925; 100 years ago
- Jurisdiction: Malaysia
- Headquarters: Ampang, Kuala Lumpur
- Parent Institute: Malaysian Rubber Board
- Key documents: Malaysian Rubber Board (Incorporation) Act 1996; Rubber Research Institute of Malaysia Act 1966; Rubber Research Institute of Malaya Enactment, 1925

The Rubber Research Institute of Malaysia (RRIM; Malay: Institut Penyelidikan Getah Malaysia) is a research center for problems and matters pertaining to rubber and its industry in Malaysia. It is part of the Malaysian Rubber Board.

== History ==
On 23 February 1925, the bill to incorporate the Rubber Research Institute of Malaya was tabled to the Federal Council of the Federated Malay States. It was passed by the council on 29 June 1925, and the law came into effect on 1 September 1925. Dr G. Bryce was appointed the first Director of the institute on 26 September 1926. On 31 October 1926, its laboratory at Petaling Estate was closed down and from 1 November 1926, the institute took over the equipment of the Rubber Growers' Association. Also in 1926, the institute made a request to the government for the temporary laboratory building of the institute at Damansara Road in Selangor. The request was granted and the building was leased for five years. In 1936, the institute decided to relocate to a new building at Ampang Road. The building was officiated by Sultan Sulaiman of Selangor on 22 April 1936 and the institute restarted its operation on 19 May 1937.

== See also ==
- Natural rubber
- Agriculture in Malaysia
- Malaysian Rubber Board
