= Stevenson Plan =

Scheme by the British government to restrict rubber supply after World War I

The Stevenson Plan, also known as the Stevenson Restriction Scheme, was a scheme by the British government over the period 1922 to 1928 to restrict natural rubber supply in order to increase rubber prices. During World War I, there was a substantial increase in rubber supply due to high demand. However, after the end of the war, rubber prices plummeted due to lower demand, which motivated the British to boost the price again by restricting supply.

The Plan succeeding in raising rubber prices initially, but over time it stimulated others (in particular, the Dutch) to boost rubber production, which led to a reduction in rubber prices over time.

The Stevenson Plan harmed the Malayan economy over the long run, as the rubber restrictions were most stringently enforced there.

== Background ==
In the early 1900s, increased reliance on the automobile and the use of rubber in common products such as boots were driving demand for rubber. At that time rubber was made from naturally occurring latex extracted from certain plants. The most important of the plants for latex production is the rubber tree, Hevea brasiliensis whose cultivation is restricted to tropical climates. At this time about 75% of rubber was controlled by British corporations, spurring efforts in Russia, Germany and the United States to reduce dependence on British rubber. All three countries were trying to develop methods of manufacturing synthetic rubber, and the United States Rubber Company began producing natural rubber in Sumatra in 1910. However, synthetic rubber was not yet practical, and natural rubber sources develop rather slowly (rubber trees must grow for six or seven years before they are productive).

Between 1914 and 1922, natural rubber prices fluctuated between $0.115 and $1.02 per pound for several reasons. One reason is South American Leaf Blight that affected rubber trees in Brazil that reduced productivity and caused British and Dutch rubber producers to start new plantations in Malaya and in the Dutch East Indies.

A second reason was that after the 1917 October Revolution, Russia renewed its effort to make synthetic rubber as part of two projects: 1) Project Bogatyr in which rubber is made from ethyl alcohol, and 2) Project Treugolnik in which the feedstock is petroleum. These projects succeeded in reducing Russian demand for British rubber.

A third reason is that during World War I (1914-1918), demand for rubber was high resulting in new sources of rubber being developed. Following the War, demand for rubber diminished, creating a glut of rubber on the market and very low prices.

== Plan ==
Around 1920 the British Rubber Growers Association turned to then Secretary of State for the Colonies, Winston Churchill, for help. Churchill initiated a committee of inquiry, the Rubber Investigation Committee, consisting primarily of Association members and chaired by Sir James Stevenson, to come up with a plan to stabilize rubber prices. The committee came up with the Stevenson Plan which would stabilize prices by limiting the tonnage of rubber exported. The plan was enacted by the governments of Ceylon and British Malaya. The Federal Legislative Council of the Federated Malay States passed the Export of Rubber (Restriction) Enactment in October 1922, to take effect on November 1.

== Outcome ==
In 1922, British interests controlled about 75% of rubber production and the United States consumed about 75% of the rubber produced. The British were still paying war debt to the United States following World War I, and needed to have a profitable rubber industry. The Dutch refused to go along with the plan out of a philosophical reluctance to regulate their industry and because they would profit from a unilateral action by the British. In the United States tiremaker Harvey Firestone reacted angrily to the act as did Secretary of Commerce Herbert Hoover.

By 1925 high prices resulting from the Stevenson Act were beginning to threaten the "American way of life", so Hoover informed the British that if the Stevenson Plan stayed in effect, the United States would try to protect itself in any way it could. DuPont, under the direction of Elmer Keiser Bolton had been working on synthetic rubber since 1920. Thomas Edison, along with several tire companies, was trying to create American-based rubber production, but with little success. The United States increasingly focused on efforts to recycle and reclaim rubber, as well as use tires in a more economic way.

On November 1, 1928, the Stevenson Act was no longer in effect, as it had been repealed. However, this was not after expanding Dutch rubber plantations had successfully captured most of the rubber market in the United States.

== Conclusion ==
Tired of regulation, rubber producers returned control of rubber prices to the free market. That worked well until the Great Depression in the 1930s lowered demand for rubber, and again rubber prices plunged. Rubber producers once again turned to regulation to maintain prices. This time it was done under the auspices of the International Rubber Regulation Agreement which was signed by all major rubber producing countries. This law succeeded in governing the price of rubber to the satisfaction of producers and most consumers. However, Japan was a consumer of rubber in the 1930s, using rubber to support its war effort in Manchuria and China, and its leaders were not happy with the price of rubber. This was one of the provocations said to motivate the Japanese attack on Pearl Harbor, which caused the United States’ entry into World War II.

== See also ==
- International Rubber Regulation Agreement
- Cartel
