= Kukup =

Village in Malaysia

- Town in Malaysia

Other transcription(s)
  - Jawi: كوكوڤ
  - Chinese: 龟咯
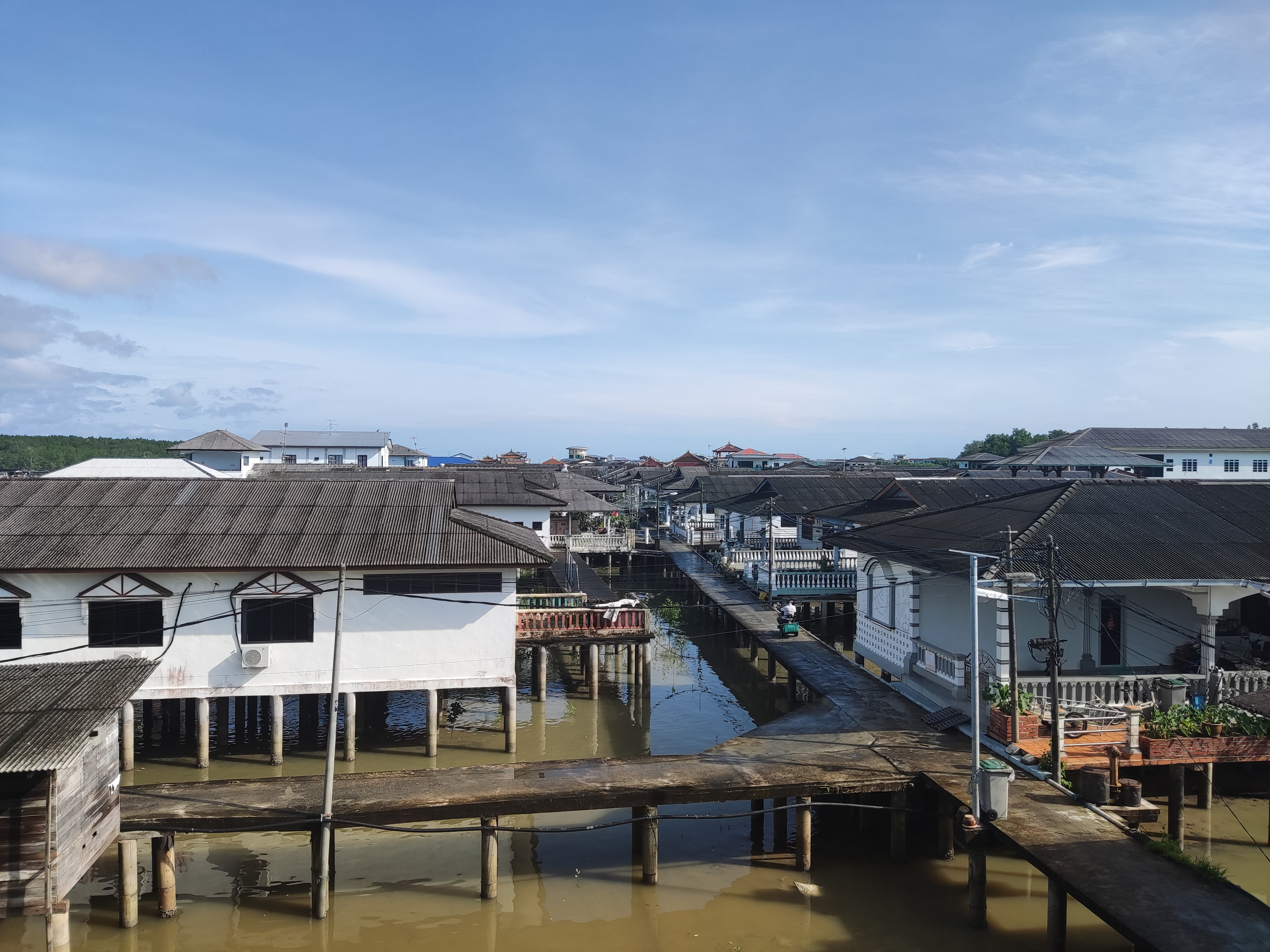
- The houses on coastal intertidal area

- Kukup location in Johor, Malay Peninsular and Malaysia Kukup (Peninsular Malaysia) Kukup (Malaysia)
- Coordinates: 1°19′35″N 103°26′41″E
- Country: Malaysia
- State: Johor
- District: Pontian
- Established: 1878; 148 years ago
- Time zone: UTC+8 (MYT)
- Postal code: 82300

Kukup (Jawi: كوكوڤ; Chinese: 龟咯) is a small fishing village in Pontian District, Johor, Malaysia. It is famous for its open-air seafood restaurants built on stilts over the water. Regularly scheduled ferries connect Kukup with Tanjung Balai in Indonesia.

== Transportation ==
The village is served by TransJohor public buses linking to Pontian Kechil.
