= International Rubber Regulation Agreement =

International rubber cartel

The International Rubber Regulation Agreement was a 1934 accord between the United Kingdom, India, the Netherlands, France and Thailand that formed a cartel of major rubber producing nations to restrict global rubber production and maintain a stable, high price for natural rubber. The agreement covered between 90–100% of world producers of rubber. The agreement was in effect from June 1934 to the early part of 1942.

The agreement harmed the Malayan economy over the long run, as the rubber restrictions were most stringently enforced there.

In 1979 a new agreement was formed - an International Natural Rubber Agreement.

== Background ==
Demand for rubber declined sharply after World War I resulting in the British enacting the Stevenson Plan in 1922 to restrict the supply of rubber to support rubber prices and ensure the profitability of British rubber plantations in the Far East. However, the plan had many flaws and was abandoned in 1928. By 1928 the plan both irritated the United States and lacked apparent purpose. Demand for rubber was robust due to expanded use of the automobile in the United States.

After the stock market crash of 1929 the Great Depression hit the United States and rubber demanded once again softened. It was in this context that the International Rubber Regulation Agreement was implemented.

The British were particularly supportive of a rubber agreement, as it was the single most important export from the British Colonial Empire.

== The Agreement ==
Rubber prices hit an all-time low in 1932. In 1933, there were negotiations to collude on rubber production to boost rubber prices. The British and Dutch governments led the negotiations.

According to Cecile Rothe, it was understood by the negotiators that a rubber cartel could only succeed if the following conditions were met:

1. "All rubber-producing countries would have to cooperate.
2. Not only would all new planting have to be prohibited, but also an increase of the potential production of existing plantations would have to be prevented.
3. Prices must not be raised so high as to threaten failure through decrease in consumption.
4. The production capacity of young plantations would have to be taken into account in calculating the quota of each country.
5. Restrictive measures must not be more onerous for native cultivators than for the European estates.
6. The scheme must be practicable, especially as to native cultivation."

The Agreement was enacted on June 1, 1934 between the United Kingdom, India, the Netherlands, France and Thailand to restrict the rubber supply in accordance with the decline of rubber prices to maintain rubber prices and profitability of rubber producing firms. The agreement both prevented establishment of new rubber plantations and placed production restrictions on existing plantations. The agreement in effect formed a cartel of rubber producing nations. To satisfy the interests of the opposite side, the rubber consuming nations, a new institutional body was established: a “Consumer Advisory Council”. Therein representatives of the three leading rubber consuming nations took place: For the United States this was „The Rubber Manufacturers’ Association of America", for Great Britain „The India Rubber Manufacturers’ Association of the United Kingdom" and for Germany the „Reichsverband der deutschen Kautschukindustrie”. Other major rubber consuming states, such as Japan or the Soviet Union, received no representation.

== Outcome ==
Contemporary observers saw the International Rubber Regulation Agreement as more effective than the Stevenson Plan, a failed British plan to curtail rubber production and boost prices.

The United States tried to become independent of the rubber cartel: establishing rubber plantations in territories under its control; conducting research into rubber-producing plants that thrive in the United States' climate; and reinvigorated efforts to replace natural rubber in tires with a synthetic. In the Fordlandia venture, Henry Ford failed in an attempt to produce rubber in Brazil. The Goodyear Tire and Rubber Company developed plantations in the Philippines and Costa Rica and Harvey Firestone developed plantations in Liberia.

Research into synthetic rubber was limited by lack of knowledge of the chemical structure of rubber compounds until after 1945. DuPont had developed neoprene in the 1920s in response to the Stevenson Plan, but neoprene was too costly for making tires. During this period the International Rubber Research & Development Board and the Research Association of British Rubber Manufacturers were founded.

Also other technologically advanced countries like Germany and the Soviet Union developed in the interwar period synthetic rubber (e.g. Buna. But this was always more expensive than natural rubber.

== International Natural Rubber Agreement, 1979 ==
The first and only agreement to come from the United Nations Conference on Trade and Development Integrated Programme for Commodities was an International Natural Rubber Agreement. The agreement had similar objectives. It introduced the concept of joint responsibility for financing international stock.

== See also ==
- Stevenson Plan
- Cartel
