= Tanjung Piai =

Nature reserve in Malaysia

Coordinates: 1°15′58″N 103°30′39″E

Designations

Ramsar Wetland
- Designated: 31 January 2003
- Reference no.: 1289

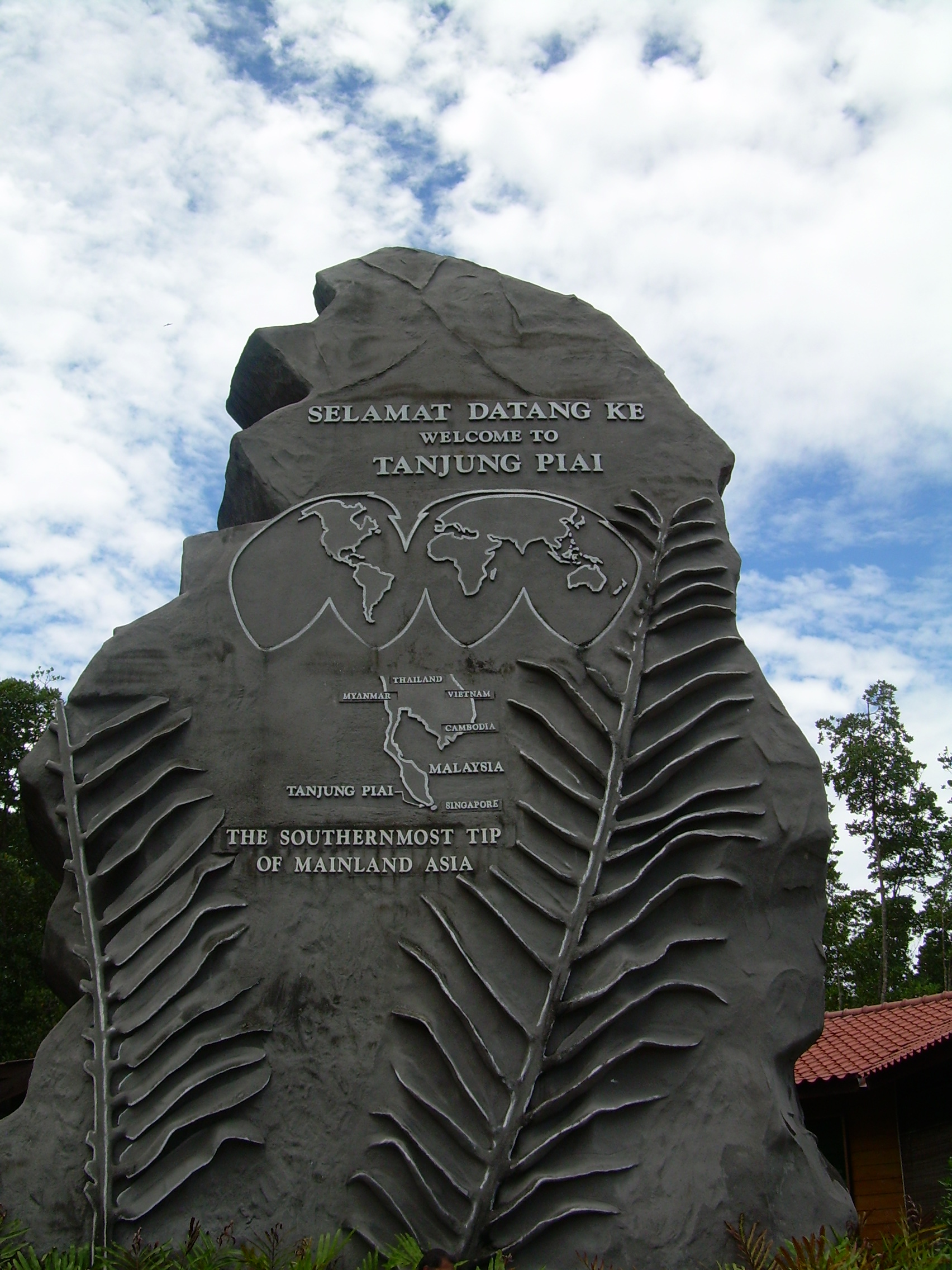
Tanjung Piai monument

Tanjung Piai (Jawi: تنجوڠ ڤياي) is a cape in Pontian District, Johor, Malaysia. It is the southernmost point of Peninsular Malaysia and thus the most southern point of mainland Eurasia. The only part of Malaysia as a whole that is further south is in Serian Division, the southernmost part of Sarawak.

The skyline of Singapore is visible across the Johor Strait from the point. It features seafood restaurants, perched on wooden jetties that are surrounded by a rugged and rarefied coastline of unspoiled mangrove forests.

A 15-metre light tower is located 0.33 nautical miles south of the point, at the edge of the dries. It flashes once every three seconds and houses a radar transponder beacon that transmits the Morse letter "M".

== Tourism ==
As the southern tip of mainland Asia, Tanjung Piai is listed as a priority site for national ecotourism being one of only five Ramsar sites in Malaysia. Tanjung Piai is also an important nature site in the State of Johor, being the third designated park of the Johor National Park Corporation. The site attracted 32,360 visitors in 2006, and also has a high socio-economic value for fisheries.

== Flora and fauna ==
Tanjung Piai has 22 mangrove tree species. It is also an important habitat for migratory and resident birds. These include the IUCN-listed vulnerable species, such as the Lesser Adjutant Stork. It is part of the Important Bird Area (IBA) of southwest Johor, which extends from Sunda Trench to Tanjung Piai. The southwest Johor mangroves are ecologically important as a natural barrier for protecting the inland villages and agricultural lands from storm events, including tsunamis.

== Conservation ==
The Tanjung Piai coastal mangrove is an internationally important Ramsar wetland site. Under the Ramsar Convention, the government and relevant stakeholders must ensure the mangrove ecosystem and its values are maintained. Erosion at the site needs to be minimized to safeguard the ecological integrity of the mangrove ecosystem. The root causes of the erosion need to be eliminated or reduced.

== Gallery ==
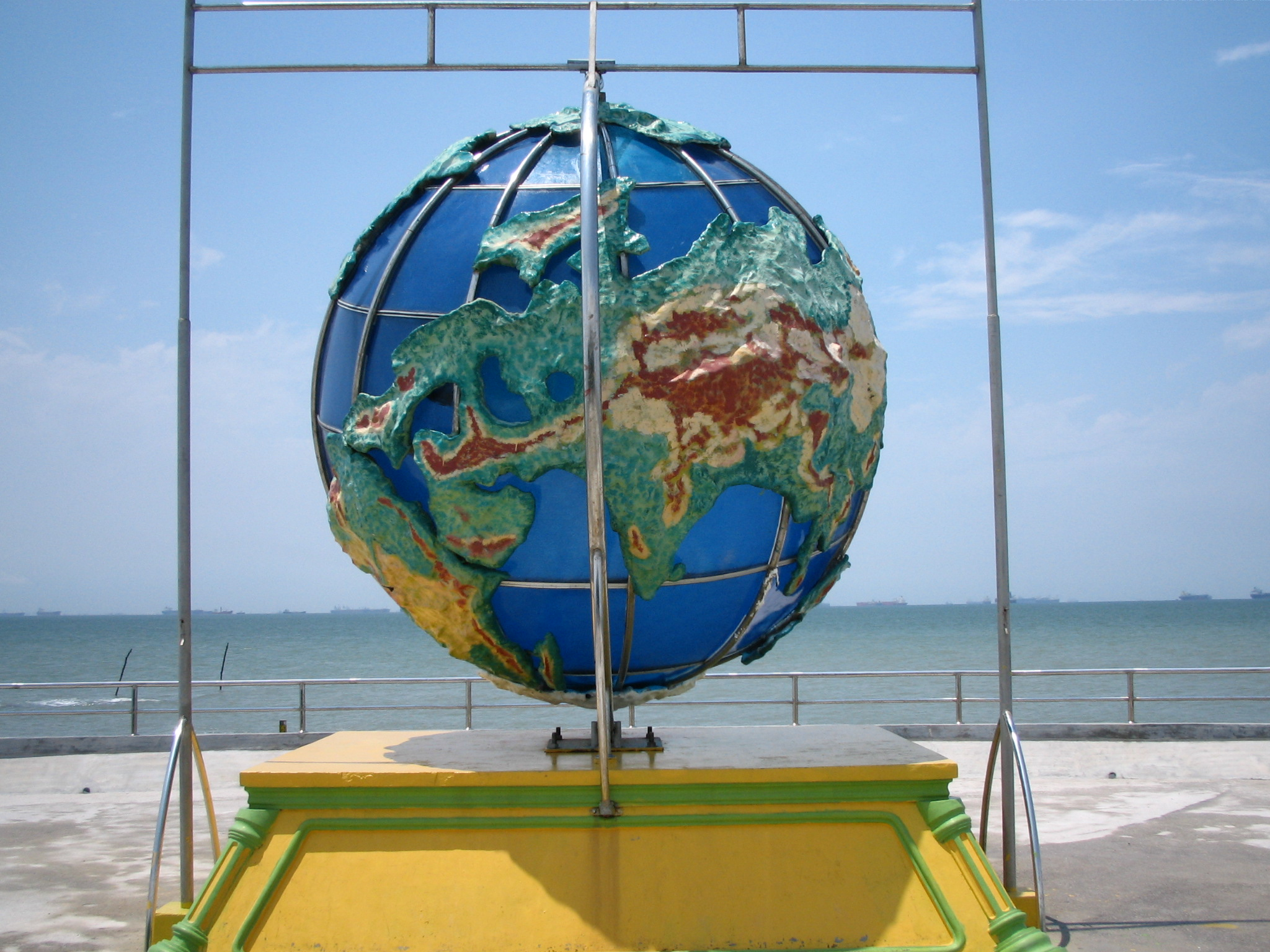
Globe monument on the southern tip of mainland Eurasia, 2006

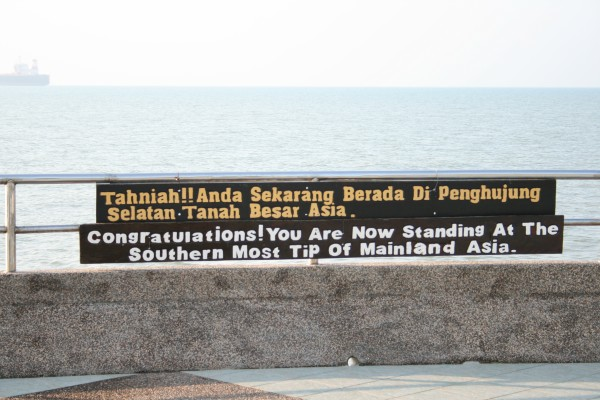
Bilingual sign in Tanjung Piai

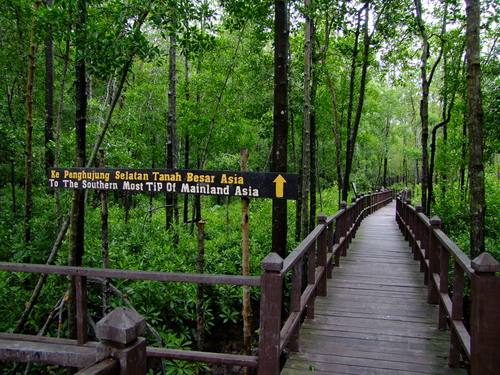
Wooden walkway in mangrove swamp

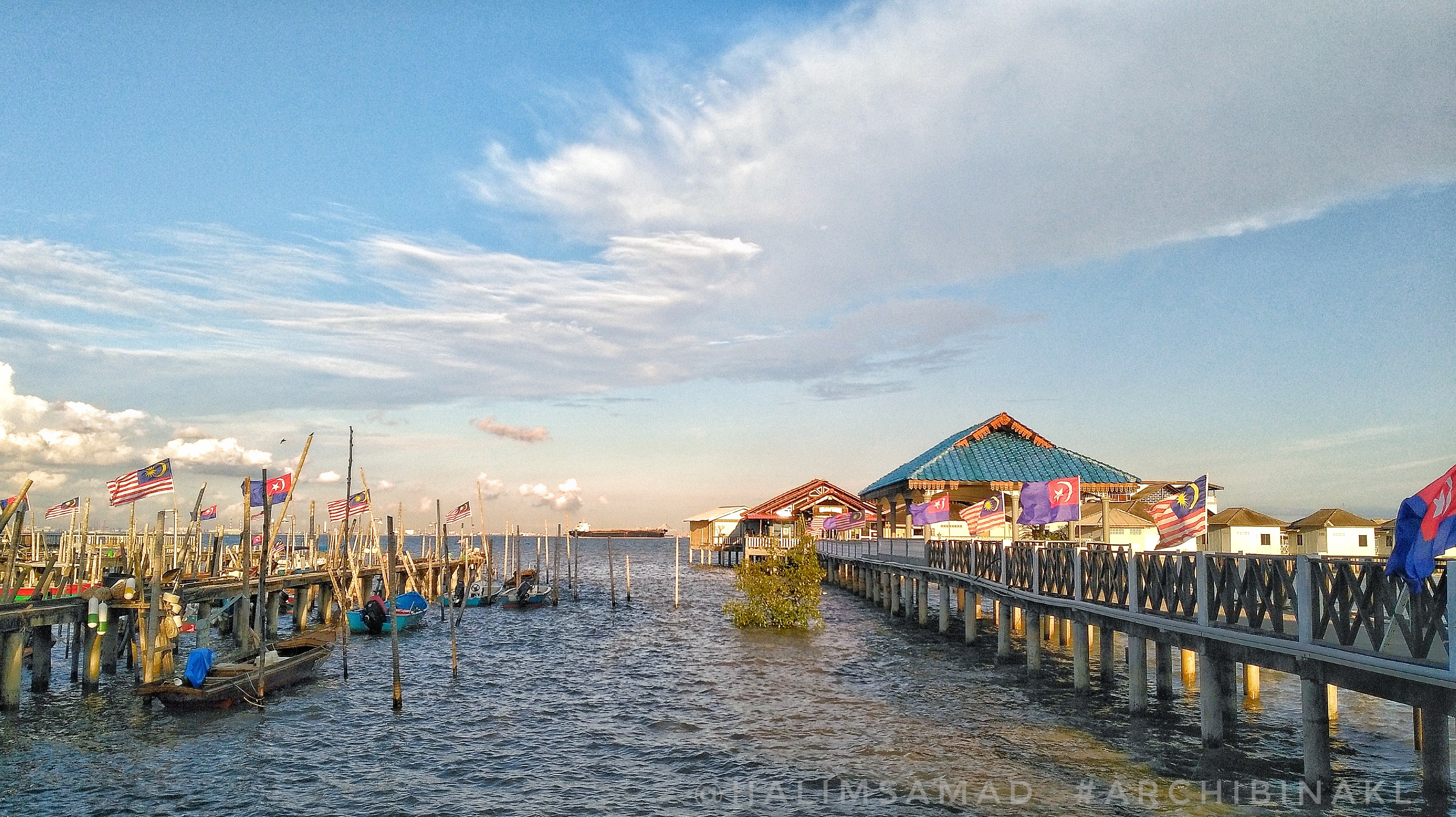
Tanjung Piai jetty

== See also ==
- Extreme points of Asia
- Geography of Malaysia
- Protected areas of Johor
