= Pontian District =

District in Johor, Malaysia

- District of Johor
- Daerah Pontian
- Flag Coat of arms
- Motto: Setia Khidmat (Malay) "Faithfully We Serve" (motto of Pontian Municipal Council)
- Location of Pontian District in Johor
- Interactive map of Pontian District
- Location of Pontian District in Malaysia
- Coordinates: 1°35′N 103°25′E
- Country: Malaysia
- State: Johor
- District Council Established: 1 November 1976
- Granted Municipal Status: 31 July 2021
- Seat: Pontian Kechil
- Local area government(s): Pontian Municipal Council

Government
  - District officer: Haji Zulkifly bin Haji Mohd Tahir
  - Pontian Member of Parliament: Ahmad Maslan (UMNO)

Area
  - Total: 932.64 km^{2} (360.09 sq mi)

Population (2010)
  - Total: 144,324
  - Density: 154.75/km^{2} (400.79/sq mi)
- Time zone: UTC+8 (MST)
  - Summer (DST): UTC+8 (Not observed)
- Postcode: 82xxx
- Calling code: +6-07
- Vehicle registration plates: J

Pontian District (Malay: Daerah Pontian) is a district located in southwest part of the Malaysian state of Johor. It borders Batu Pahat and Kluang Districts to the north and Kulai and Johor Bahru Districts to the east.

The district is home to Tanjung Piai, the southernmost point of the Malay Peninsula and mainland Eurasia as a whole.

== Etymology ==
The name of Pontian was derived from the Malay word “Perhentian” which means a stop, a reference to the sailors travelling to and from Singapore or Malacca stopping at Pontian Besar River for shelter from the rough waters in the Strait of Malacca.

== Administrative divisions ==
Pontian District is divided into 11 mukims:

- Api-Api
- Ayer Baloi
- Ayer Masin
- Benut
- Jeram Batu
- Pengkalan Raja
- Pontian
- Rimba Terjun
- Serkat
- Sungai Karang
- Sungai Pinggan

2 big towns (bandar):

- Benut
- Pontian Kechil

And 1 small town (pekan):

- Pekan Nanas

== Administration ==
Pontian Municipal Council Majlis Perbandaran Pontian
- Emblem

Type
- Type: Local authority of Pontian District

History
- Founded: 31 July 2021
- Preceded by: Pontian District Council

Leadership
- President: Abdul Azim Shamsuddin (since 3 February 2025)
- Secretary: Tifla Mohd Addi (since 15 January 2024)

Structure
- Seats: 23
- Political groups: Councillors: BN (23): UMNO (13); MCA (8); MIC (2)
- Length of term: 1 April 2024–31 December 2025

Motto
- Setia Khidmat (Faithfully We Serve)

Meeting place
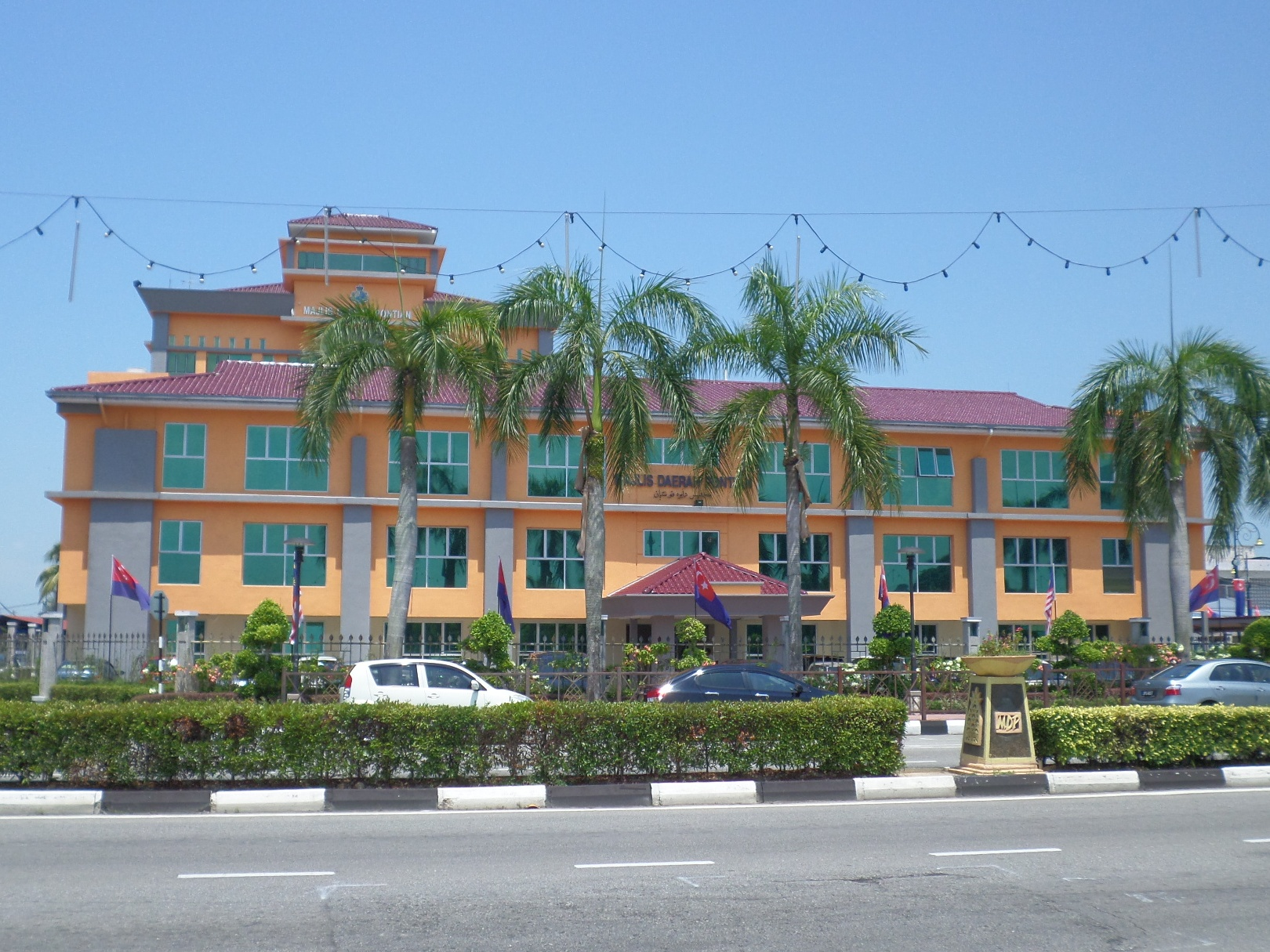
- Jalan Alsagoff, 82000 Pontian, Johor Darul Ta'zim

Website
- www.mppn.gov.my

Coat of arms of Pontian District Council, predecessor of Pontian Municipal Council.

The entire Pontian District is administered by the Pontian Municipal Council (Malay: Majlis Perbandaran Pontian, MPPN), which was previously known as the Pontian District Council (Malay: Majlis Daerah Pontian, MDPontian). The latter was formed on 1 November 1976 by merging the Pontian Town Council and the local councils of Pekan Nanas, Benut, Ayer Baloi and Permas. The upgradation of the District Council as the Municipal Council took place on 31 July 2021.

=== Presidents ===
No	Name	Term start	Term end
1	Mohd Ezuddin Sanusi	1 February 2021	31 December 2023
2	Abdul Razak Khalid	1 January 2024	31 January 2025
3	Abdul Azim Shamsuddin	3 February 2025	Present

=== Departments ===
- Management Services (Khidmat Pengurusan)
- Treasury (Perbendaharaan)
- Valuation and Property Management (Penilaian dan Pengurusan Harta)
- Urban Planning and Landscape (Perancang Bandar dan Landskap)
- Public Health (Kesihatan Awam)
- Licensing and Enforcement (Pelesenan dan Penguatkuasaan)
- Engineering and Building (Kejuruteraan dan Bangunan)
- Community Development (Pembangunan Masyarakat)

=== Units ===
- Public Relations and Corporate (Perhubungan Awam dan Korporat)
- Law (Undang-undang)
- Internal Audit (Audit Dalam)
- One Stop Centre (Pusat Sehenti)
- Tourism (Pelancongan)

=== Administration areas (zones) ===
As of 2025, Pontian District is divided into 23 zones represented by 23 councillors to act as mediators between residents and the municipal council. The councillors for the 1 April 2024 to 31 December 2025 session are as below:

Zone	Councillor	Political affiliation
Pontian A	Jamaludin Abd Majid	UMNO
Pontian B	Faridah A Kadir	UMNO
Pontian C	Oh Jit Hwa	MCA
Pontian D	Rosdi Hassan	UMNO
Pontian E	Mohd Iskandar Selamat	UMNO
Pontian F	Heng Zhi Li	MCA
Pontian G	Mohd Isa Ismail	UMNO
Pontian H	Mohd Mokhtar Tang Abdullah	UMNO
Pontian I	Md Israk Abdullah	UMNO
Pontian J	Tan Lye Huat	MCA
Pekan Nanas A	Abdul Razif Ruhani	UMNO
Pekan Nanas B	Teo Yi Chang	MCA
Pekan Nanas C	Zarina Mohamed Baen	UMNO
Pekan Nanas D	Krishnan Kumar Letchumenan	MIC
Benut A	Bariman Ahmad	UMNO
Benut B	Tan Wei Jie	MCA
Benut C	Mohamad Jahis Othman	UMNO
Benut D	Siti Zaharah Jumat	UMNO
Permas A	Kok See Chin	MCA
Permas B	Syahdan Rahmat	UMNO
Permas C	Tan Jia Liang	MCA
Ayer Baloi A	Ajit Singh Jasbir Singh	MIC
Ayer Baloi B	Tan Sing Ling	MCA

== Demographics ==
Historical population
Year	Pop.	±%
1991	129,356	—
2000	142,697	+10.3%
2010	149,938	+5.1%
2020	173,318	+15.6%

In 2000, the annual population growth of Pontian District was 2.36%.

== Economy ==
The main economic activities in the district are agriculture, construction, ecotourism, fishery and marine and food processing industries. The former includes pineapple farms and palm oil plantations, which are mainly focused in the town of Pekan Nanas.

== Transportation ==
=== Road ===
The district is accessible by bus from Larkin Sentral (BAS.MY Johor Bahru - J50) in Johor Bahru.

=== Sea ===
There are regularly scheduled ferries connecting fishing village Kukup in Serkat Mukim with Tanjung Balai Karimun in Riau Islands, Indonesia.
