= Pontian Kechil =

Coordinates: 1°28′43.2″N 103°23′22.0″E

- Town and district capital
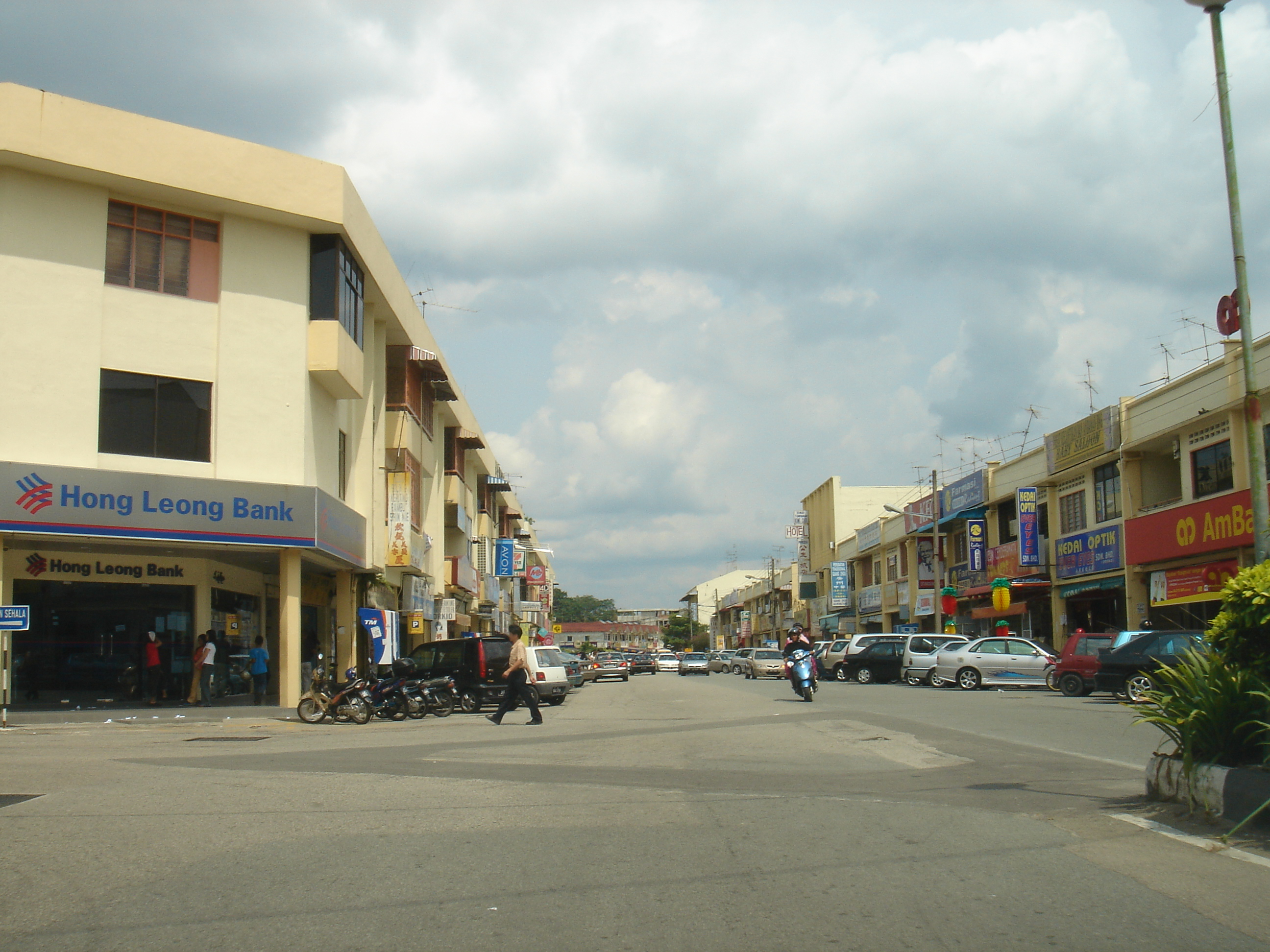
- Commercial Shophouses at Jalan Taib Utama
- Interactive map of Pontian Kechil
- Country: Malaysia
- State: Johor
- District: Pontian
- Postcode: 82000
- Calling code: +6-07
- Vehicle registration: J

Pontian Kechil (translated as Little Pontian) also known as Pontian Town (Malay: Bandar Pontian) is a town and the administrative and economic centre of Pontian District, Johor, Malaysia, with a fishing as its main economy. It has an area of 6.6 km^{2}. Pontian Plaza is the town's principal shopping centre.
