= Government of Johor =

Executive and legislative authorities governing the Malaysian state of Johor

State Government of Johor
- Kerajaan Negeri Johor
- State government

Overview
- Established: 14 April 1895; 131 years ago as a sultanate government; 31 August 1957; 68 years ago as a Malaysian state
- State: Johor
- Leader: Menteri Besar
- Appointed by: Sultan
- Main organ: Johor State Executive Council
- Responsible to: Johor State Legislative Assembly
- Annual budget: RM 2.546 Billion (2026)
- Headquarters: Kota Iskandar, Iskandar Puteri
- Website: www.johor.gov.my

The Government of Johor, officially the State Government of Johor, refers to the government authority of the Malaysian state of Johor. The state government adheres to and is created by both the Federal Constitution of Malaysia, the supreme law of Malaysia, and the Constitution of Johor, the supreme law in Johor. The government of Johor is based in Iskandar Puteri, the state's administrative capital.

The state government consists of only two branches – executive and legislative. The Johor State Executive Council forms the executive branch, whilst the Johor State Legislative Assembly is the legislature of the state government. Johor's head of government is the Menteri Besar. The state government does not have a judiciary branch, as Malaysia's judicial system is a federalised system operating uniformly throughout the country.

== Executive ==
=== Head of government ===
The Menteri Besar is the head of government in Johor. He is officially appointed by the Sultan of Johor, Johor's head of state, on the basis of the latter's judgement that the former commands the confidence of the majority of the State Assemblymen in the Johor State Legislative Assembly. The Menteri Besar and his Executive Council shall be collectively responsible to Legislative Assembly. The Office of the Menteri Besar is situated inside Dato Jaafar Muhammad Building in Kota Iskandar.

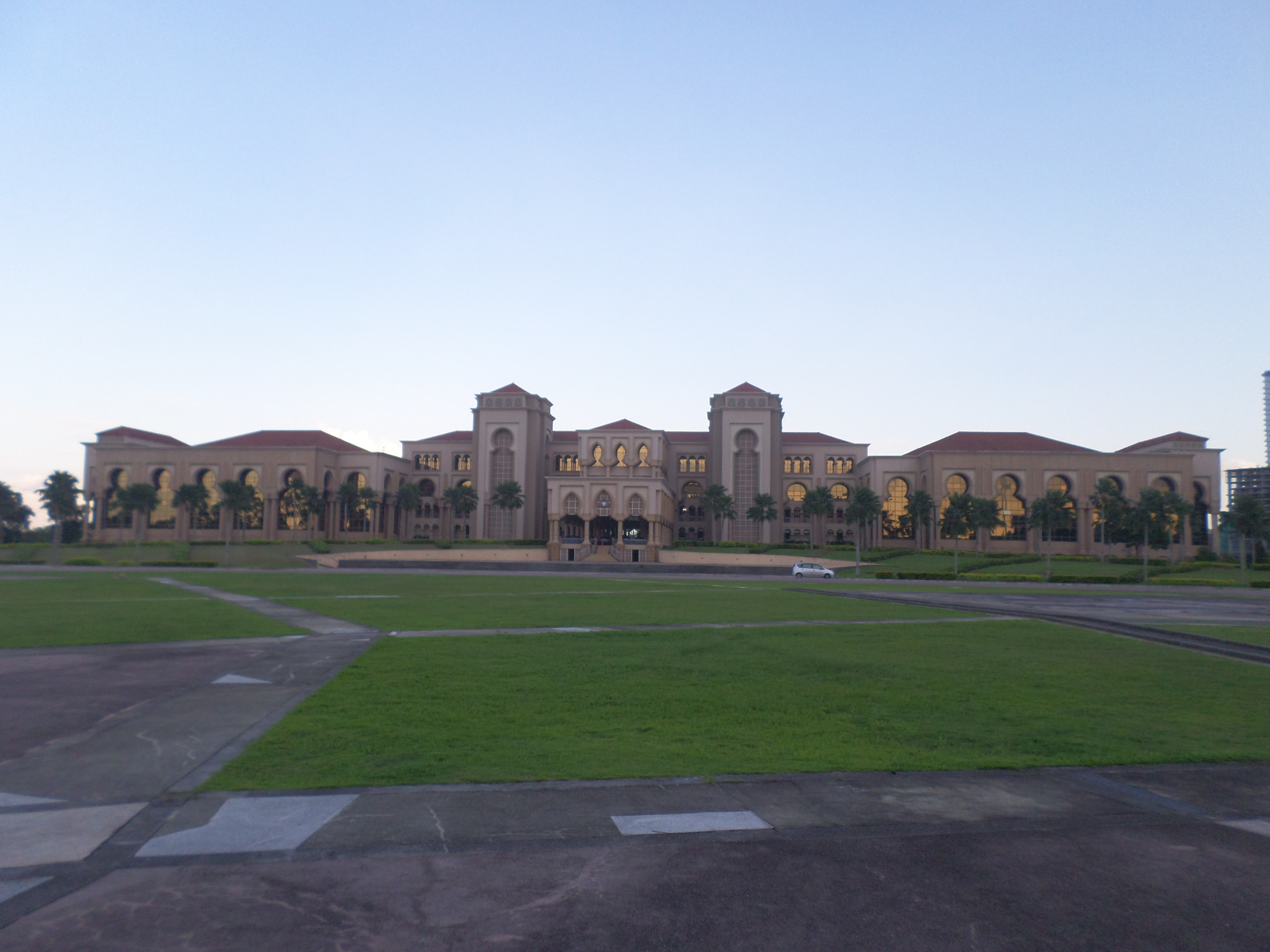
The Dato Jaafar Muhammad Building houses the Office of the Menteri Besar of Johor, as well as the state government secretariat.

The Menteri Besar of Johor is Onn Hafiz Ghazi of the Barisan Nasional (BN) coalition that holds the most seats in the State Legislative Assembly among the three coalitions in the state assembly. Onn Hafiz assumed office on 15 June 2022, having been elected as a Member of the State Legislative Assembly in the 2022 state election that returned BN to power.

=== Cabinet ===
The Johor State Executive Council forms the executive branch of the Johor state government and is analogous in function to the Malaysian federal Cabinet. The Executive Council is led by the Menteri Besar and made up of between four and 10 other State Assemblymen from the Johor State Legislative Assembly. Aside from these, three other ex officio members of the Executive Council are the State Secretary, the State Legal Adviser and the State Financial Officer.

Following the 2022 Johor state election, Onn Hafiz Ghazi was appointed as the Menteri Besar after Barisan Nasional (BN) coalition returned to power. All members were sworn in on 26 March 2022. An executive council reshuffle took place on 13 February 2024, when Tanjung Surat representative Aznan Tamin was appointed to replace Johor Lama representative Norzilah Noh as member.

BN (11)
- UMNO (8)
- MCA (2)
- MIC (1)

Name	Portfolio	Party	Constituency	Term start	Term end
Onn Hafiz Ghazi (Menteri Besar)	Natural Resources; Administration; Finance; Planning; Economic Development; Tourism (2024–present)	UMNO	Machap	15 March 2022	Incumbent
Zahari Sarip	Agriculture; Agro-based Industry; Rural Development	UMNO	Buloh Kasap	26 March 2022	Incumbent
Mohd Jafni Md Shukor	Housing; Local Government	UMNO	Bukit Permai	26 March 2022	Incumbent
Khairin Nisa	Women; Family; Community Development	UMNO	Serom	26 March 2022	Incumbent
Mohd Hairi Mad Shah	Youth and Sports; Entrepreneur Development; Corporations; Human Resources (2022–2024)	UMNO	Larkin	26 March 2022	Incumbent
Mohd Fared Mohd Khalid	Islamic Religious Affairs	UMNO	Semerah	26 March 2022	Incumbent
Mohamad Fazli Mohamad Salleh	Works; Transportation; Infrastructure; Communication (2024–present)	UMNO	Bukit Pasir	26 March 2022	Incumbent
Norlizah Noh	Education; Information; Communication (2022–2024)	UMNO	Johor Lama	26 March 2022	13 February 2024
Aznan Tamin	Education; Information	UMNO	Tanjung Surat	13 February 2024	Incumbent
Ling Tian Soon	Health; Unity (2022–2024); Environment	MCA	Yong Peng	26 March 2022	Incumbent
Lee Ting Han	Investment; Trade; Consumer Affairs; Human Resources (2024–present)	MCA	Paloh	26 March 2022	Incumbent
Raven Kumar Krishnasamy	Tourism (2022–2024); Environment (2022–2024); Unity (2024–present); Culture; Heritage	MIC	Tenggaroh	26 March 2022	Incumbent

=== Ex officio members ===
Position	Office bearer
State Secretary	Mohammed Ridha Abd Kadir
State Legal Adviser	Abd Aziz Engan
State Financial Officer	Mohd Norazam Osman

== Legislature ==
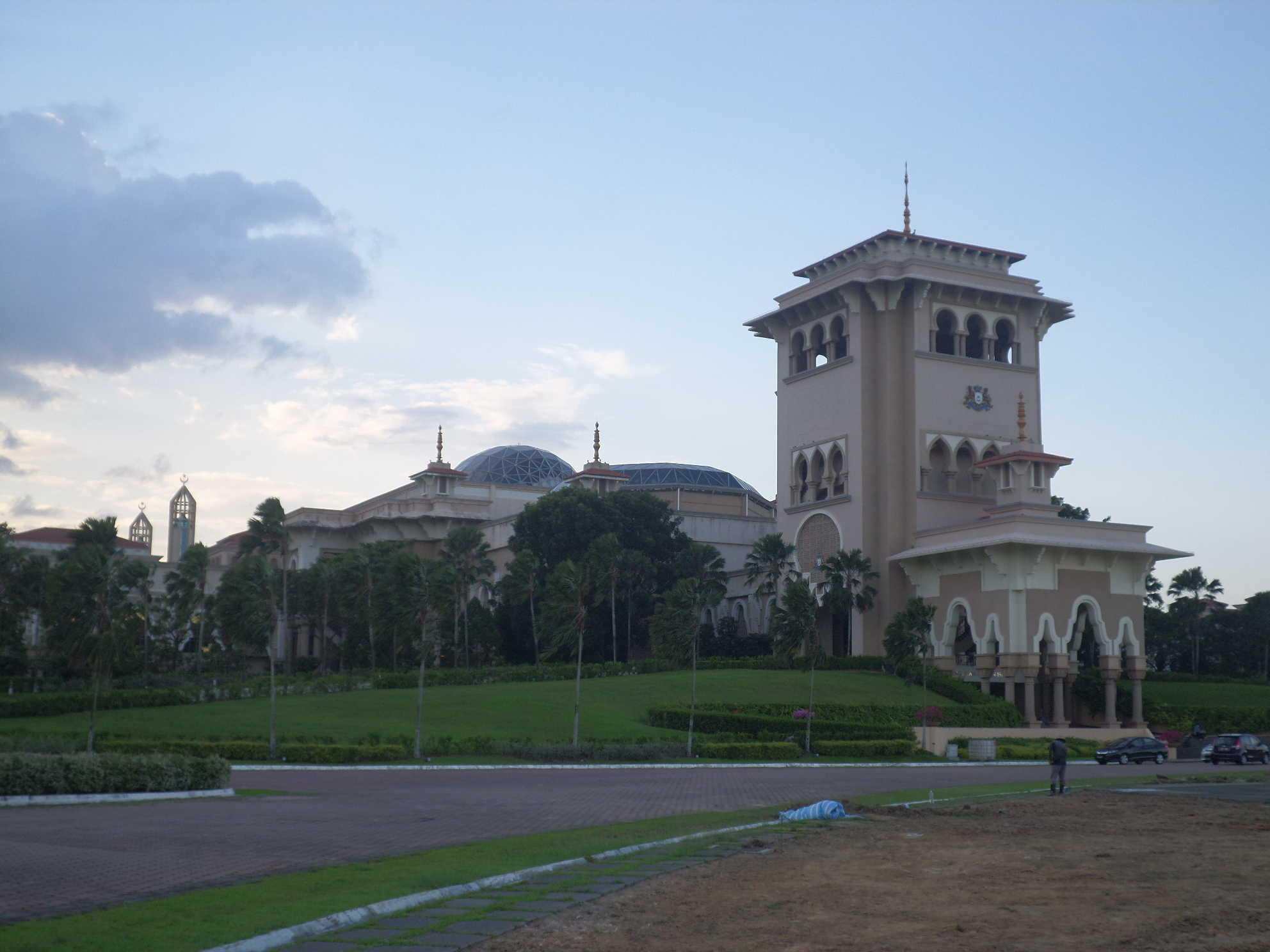
Sultan Ismail Building.

Composition of the Johor State Legislative Assembly after the 2022 Johor state election. Barisan Nasional (BN) holds 40 seats. Pakatan Harapan (PH) holds 12 seats. Perikatan Nasional (PN) holds 3 seats. Malaysian United Democratic Alliance (MUDA) holds 1 seat

The Johor State Legislative Assembly is the legislative branch of the Johor state government. The unicameral legislature consists of 56 seats that represent the 56 state constituencies within Johor, with each constituency being represented by an elected State Assemblyman. The Legislative Assembly convenes at the Sultan Ismail Building in Kota Iskandar.

The legislature has a maximum mandate of five years by law and follows a multi-party system; the ruling party (or coalition) is elected through a first-past-the-post system. The Sultan may dissolve the legislature at any time and usually does so upon the advice of the Menteri Besar.

A Speaker is elected by the Legislative Assembly to preside over the proceedings and debates of the legislature. The Speaker may or may not be an elected State Assemblyman; in the case of the latter, the elected Speaker shall become a member of the Legislative Assembly additional to the elected State Assemblymen already in the legislature.

== Johor State Government Secretariat Office ==
=== Development Cluster ===
- State Economic Planning Division
- Local Government Division
- Water Regulatory Division
- Tourism Johor
- InvestJohor

=== Management Cluster ===
- Human Resource Management Unit
- Office of Secretary of the State Assembly
- Management Service Unit
- State Landscape Department
- Human Capital Strategic Unit
- ICT@Johor
- State Secretariat Incorporated Management Unit
- Corporate and Quality Unit

=== Project Supervision and People's Wellbeing Cluster ===
- Supervision Unit
- Internal Audit Unit
- Integrity Unit

=== Sports, Youth and Volunteer Cluster ===
- Johor State Sports Council

== Departments, statutory bodies and subsidiaries ==
=== Departments ===
- Johor State Islamic Religious Department
- Johor Royal Department
- Johor Military Forces
- Johor Mufti Department
- Johor State Syariah Judicial Department
- Johor Syariah Prosecution Department
- Johor State Treasury Department
- Office of Lands and Mines Johor
- Johor Town and Country Planning Department (PLANMalaysia Johor)
- Johor Public Works Department
- Johor Irrigation and Drainage Department
- Johor Social Welfare Department
- Johor Veterinary Services Department
- Johor State Agriculture Department
- Johor State Forestry Department

=== Statutory bodies ===
- Institut Dato Onn
- Johor Corporation (JCORP)
- Johor Islamic Religious Council
- Johor State Biotechnology and Biodiversity Corporation
- Johor Islamic Corporation
- Johor State Housing Development Corporation
- Johor Public Library Corporation
- Johor State Stadium Corporation
- Johor National Park Corporation
- Johor Public Service Commission
- Johor Education Foundation
- Darul Ta'zim Family Development Foundation
- Johor Heritage Foundation
- Media Digital Johor
- Johor Economic, Tourism and Cultural Office

=== Subsidiaries ===
- State Secretary Incorporated
  - Kumpulan Prasarana Rakyat Johor Sdn Bhd
  - Public Transport Corporation of Johor
  - Permodalan Darul Ta'zim Sdn Bhd
    - Johor Centre for Construction Development Sdn. Bhd. (JCCD)
    - Perbadanan Usahawan Johor Sdn Bhd
    - Johor Special Water Sdn Bhd
    - Kumpulan PDT Oil & Gas Services Sdn. Bhd.
    - Syarikat Air Johor Sdn Bhd
- Johor Islamic Corporation
  - PIJ Holdings Sdn Bhd
- Johor Education Foundation
  - YPJ Holdings Sdn Bhd
    - YPJ Education Group
    - YPJ Plantations Sdn. Bhd.
    - YPJ Builders Sdn. Bhd.
- Johor Islamic Religious Council
  - Sultan Ibrahim Johor Islamic University College (KUIJSI)

== District and Lands Offices ==
- Batu Pahat District
  - Rengit Subdistrict
- Johor Bahru District
- Kota Tinggi District
  - Pengerang Subdistrict
- Kluang District
- Kulai District
- Mersing District
- Muar District
- Pontian District
- Segamat District
  - Labis Subdistrict
- Tangkak District

== Local governments ==
- Batu Pahat Municipal Council
- Johor Bahru City Council
- Iskandar Puteri City Council
- Kluang Municipal Council
- Kota Tinggi District Council
- Kulai Municipal Council
- Labis District Council
- Mersing District Council
- Muar Municipal Council
- Pasir Gudang City Council
- Pengerang Municipal Council
- Pontian Municipal Council
- Segamat Municipal Council
- Simpang Renggam District Council
- Tangkak District Council
- Yong Peng District Council
