= Cahaya Jauhar =

Government Linked Company in Johor, Malaysia

Cahaya Jauhar Sdn Bhd
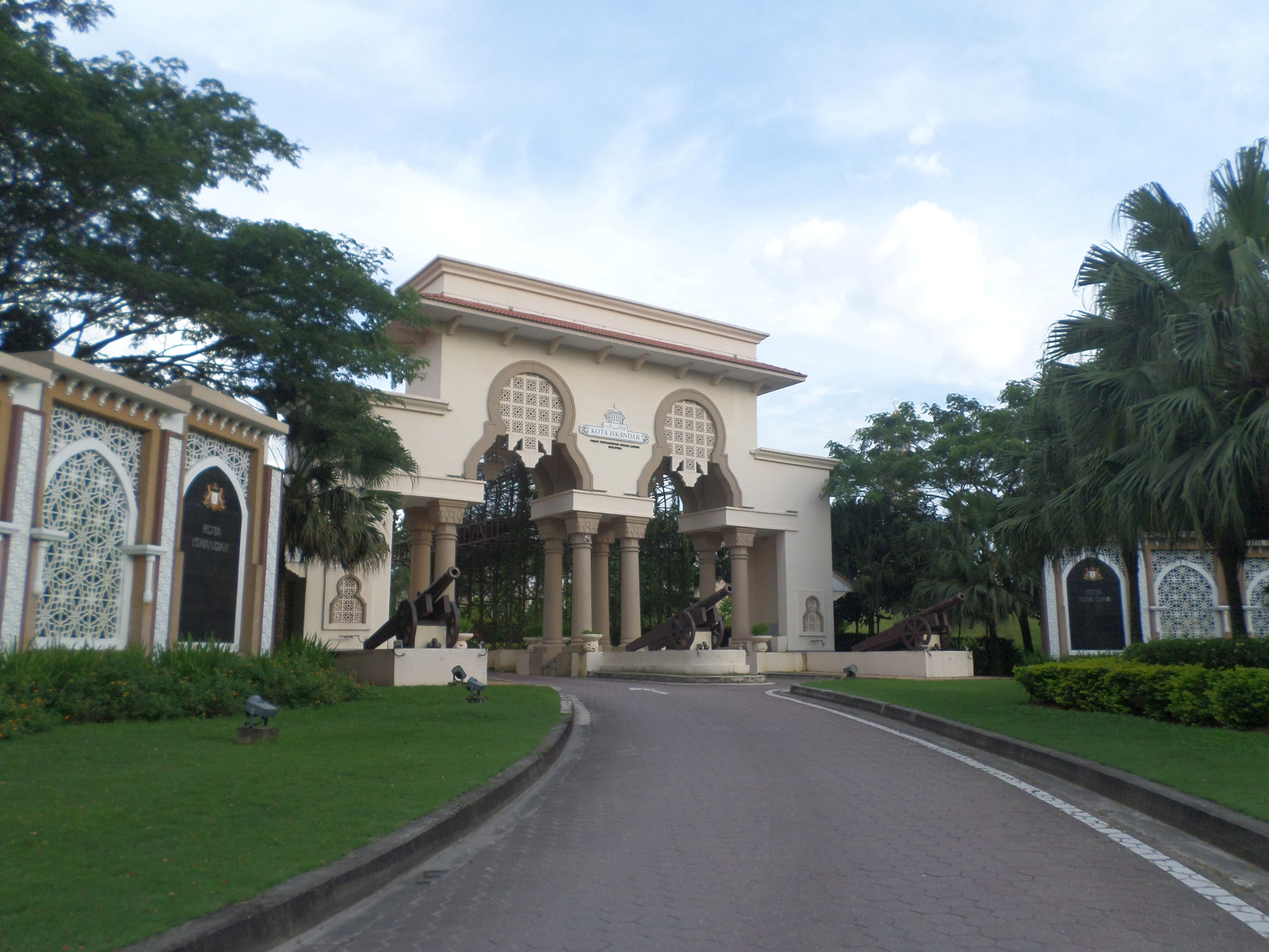
- Type: Government Linked Company
- Industry: Developer
- Founded: 2004
- Founder: Mohd Auzir Mohd Tahir
- Headquarters: Iskandar Puteri, Johor Malaysia
- Key people: Dato Ayob Mion, Chairman (former State Secretary of Johor)
- Products: Kota Iskandar
- Parent: Original joint venture: Johor State Secretary Incorporated, UEM Land Berhad

Cahaya Jauhar (Cahaya Jauhar Sdn Bhd) is a Government Linked Company in Johor, Malaysia. It is a special vehicle joint venture company between the State of Johor under state-owned Johor State Secretary Incorporation (JSSI) and the Malaysia Federal Government under government linked company, UEM Land Berhad (Master Developer of Iskandar Puteri) to develop the new Johor State's administrative centre, which later known as Kota Iskandar and other government institutional building in Iskandar Puteri.

== List of developments ==
=== Kota Iskandar ===
- Sultan Ismail Building (Johor's Parliament)
- Kota Iskandar Mosque
- Dato Jaafar Muhammad Building (Menteri Besar and State Secretary Complex)
- Dato Abdul Rahmand Andak Building
- Dato Mohammad Salleh Perang Building
- Dato Mohammad Ibrahim Munsyi Building
- Jauhar Child Care Centre
- Johor Bahru Court Complex

=== Development ===
- Puncak Jauhar Development (under subsidiary CJ Development Sdn Bhd)

=== Landscape ===
- Kota Iskandar Mahkota Square
- Qiblat Axis
- Firdaus Garden
- Carmen Garden

=== Others ===
- Iskandar Puteri Fire and Rescue Station
- BPUNJ Office Complex
- Johor Pavilion

== Publications ==
- In 2009, Cahaya Jauhar published a 228-page book titled The Making of Kota Iskandar: Johor State New Administrative Centre : Johor in the 21st Century authored by Premilla Mohanlall and Majella Gomes.

== Awards and achievements ==
- Malaysia Landscape Architecture Award 2018
- FIABCI Malaysia Property Award 2017
- The Iskandar Malaysia Accolades Award 2016/2017
- Malaysia Landscape Architecture Award 2012
- Singapore Design Award 2012
- Johor Tourism Award 2012
- Tourism Award 2012
- Malaysia Landscape Architecture Award 2011
- The Majestic Five Continents Award 2011 for Quality and Excellence, Rome, Italy
- FIABCI World Prix d’Excellence Award 2011 Public Infrastructure / Amenities, Paphos, Cyprus
- 23rd International Construction Award 2011 New Millennium Award, Paris, France
- FIABCI Malaysia Property Award 2010
- Best State Pavilion Award 2008
- Planning Excellence Award 2007

== See also ==
- Kota Iskandar
- Iskandar Puteri
- UEM Land Berhad
