= Sultan Ibrahim Building =

Former state government offices and legislative building in Johor, Malaysia

- Bangunan Sultan Ibrahim
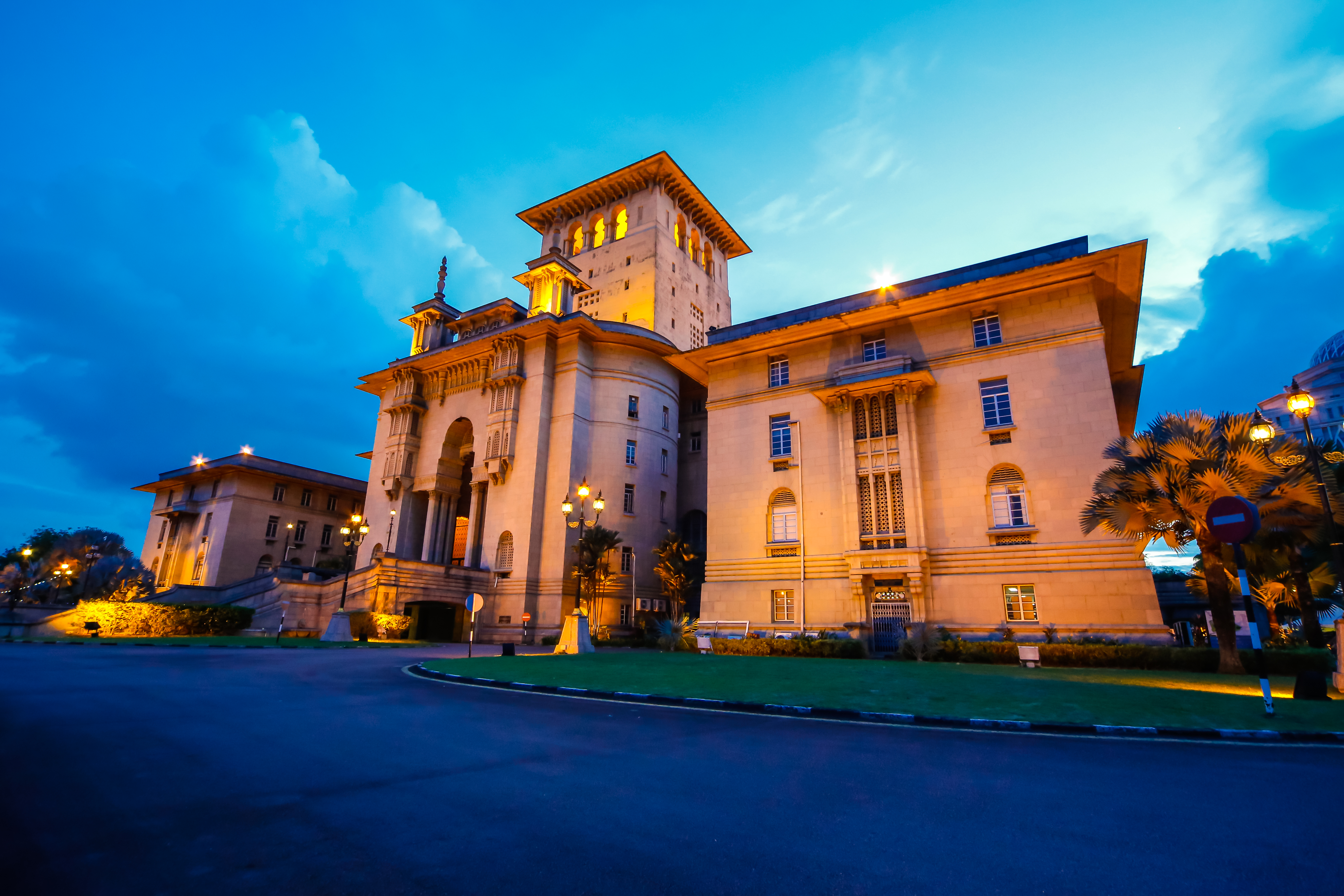
- The Sultan Ibrahim Building in 2013
- Interactive map of the Sultan Ibrahim Building area

General information
- Status: Completed
- Type: Former state government administrative offices and legislative building (before 2010)
- Location: Bukit Timbalan, Johor Bahru, Johor, Malaysia
- Construction started: 1936; 90 years ago
- Completed: 1940; 86 years ago
- Owner: Johor state government (until 2015); DYMM Sultan Ibrahim ibni Almarhum Sultan Iskandar (since 2015)

The Sultan Ibrahim Building (Malay: Bangunan Sultan Ibrahim; Jawi: باڠونن سلطان إبراهيم) is a former state secretariat building of Johor. It is located at Bukit Timbalan in Johor Bahru. The building was constructed between 1936 and 1939 and was completed in 1940 as the Government of Johor attempted to streamline the state's administration. It was officially opened by the late Sultan Ibrahim of Johor.

It was also the tallest building in Malaya during pre-independence era. In Johor Bahru itself, it stood unchallenged as the tallest building in the town until the completion of the Merlin Tower in the 1970s.

The offices of the state secretariat have now moved to Kota Iskandar. There are plans to convert the building into a museum.

== Architecture ==
The building's architecture combines colonial and Malay architecture with its Saracenic design and tower making it a landmark in Johor Bahru. The building was designed by the renowned British architecture firm, Palmer and Turner which was also responsible for designing the Johor Bahru General Hospital now known as Hospital Sultanah Aminah as well as several prominent landmarks in Singapore.

The building formerly housed the Menteri Besar's (Chief Minister) office and the Johor State Legislative Assembly before both were moved to Kota Iskandar.

== Construction ==
The reinforced concrete construction, with stone facing, is built on a metal framework that consists of 3,000 tons of structural steelwork which was fabricated in the Singapore workshops of United Engineers Ltd, who were also responsible for its erection in 1940. Another Singapore-based company, Ah Hong and Company, was responsible for the general construction.

== Japanese occupation ==
In 1942, during the Japanese occupation of Malaya, the Japanese Imperial Army led by General Yamashita Tomoyuki stationed themselves at the building and Istana Bukit Serene to plan for the invasion of Singapore. The Japanese used the building as a fortress and a command centre to spy on the British activities in Singapore. The building was partly damaged during the Japanese invasion and the damaged parts are still visible today.

== See also ==
- Johor Sultanate
