= Kemudi River =

River in Iskandar Puteri, Johor, Malaysia

Kemudi River سوڠاي كمودي
- Native name: Sungai Kemudi (Malay)

Location
- Country: Malaysia
- State: Johor
- Region: Iskandar Malaysia
- District: Iskandar Puteri

Physical characteristics
- Mouth: Strait of Johor
  - location: Iskandar Puteri, Johor
  - coordinates: 1°23′39″N 103°38′50″E

The Kemudi River (Malay: Sungai Kemudi) is a river which flows through the mangroves of Iskandar Puteri in the state of Johor in Malaysia. The river takes a unique shape, splitting into two at the mouth.

== History ==
The Kemudi River was part of the Kemudi River Rubber Estate, which later became the Kemudi River Forest Reserve. An estate office and kampung (traditional Malay village), now demolished, existed near the banks of the Kemudi River.

=== Mangrove erosion ===
In 2022, reporters and local academics visited the Kemudi river and observed that some surrounding mangrove roots were exposed to the air. This observation signals mud and soil displacement, which leads to the disturbance and erosion of the forest ecosystem.

In 2025, participants of the Iskandar Puteri Blue Carton Trail Expedition conducted census activities on mangroves in the Kemudi River and reported difficulty in navigation, going through inaccessible beaches in waist-deep mud.

Measures have been taken to conserve and address instances of mangrove erosion nearby the Kemudi river, however, no specific efforts have begun with the Kemudi river itself.

In the environmental impact assessment of Forest City, the Kemudi River was undertaken as a subject of environmental concern and study, specifically the effects of Forest City's land reclamation on the shoreline and mangroves of the Kemudi River.

== Kemudi River Forest Reserve ==
=== Initial gazettement ===
In 1961, the Johor state government gazetted 76.42 ha of land surrounding the Kemudi River as a mangrove forest reserve.

=== Degazettement ===
In 2007, the Johor Land and Mines Office forwarded a bill to cancel the forest reservation status. On the 15th of February 2007, the Johor statement government gazetted a notice to cancel the forest reservation status. On the 24th of April 2007, the government issued a title deed for the forest reserve land and changed the zoning category from forest reserve to agriculture.

In 2019, the Johor State Planning Committee proposed and subsequently approved plans to change the zoning of the land to a mixed-use development, consisting of 70% business and 30% low-density housing.

In 2025, the Iskandar Puteri City Council released a report, citing attractive urban development opportunities and the sites' proximity to Kota Iskandar, the state administrative capital and the Tuas Second Link, the second land border connecting Malaysia and Singapore, for the degazettement and rezoning decisions.
