= Nusa Bayu =

Bandar Nusa Bayu بانـــدر نوســـا بايـــو 努沙峇友
- Township
- Flag
- Nickname: Nusa Bayu
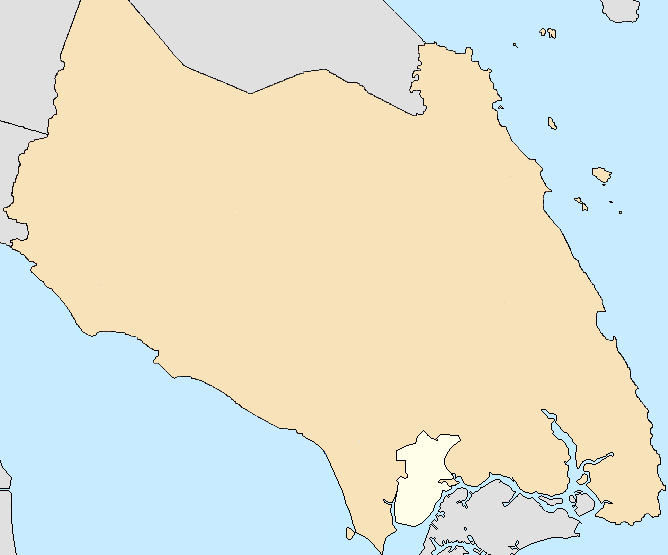
- Bandar Nusa Bayu shown within Iskandar Puteri
- Coordinates: 1°32′00″N 103°40′00″E
- Country: Malaysia
- State: Johor
- District: Johor Bahru
- City: Iskandar Puteri
- Mukim: Jelutong

Government
  - Type: City Council
  - Local Authority: Majlis Bandaraya Iskandar Puteri
  - Mayor: Datuk Adib Azhari (2017); Datuk Salehuddin Hassan (2019); Datuk Mohd Haffiz Ahmad (2021)
  - Penghulu: Tok Zainudin (Pulai-Jelutong); Tok Muhaimin Hussin (2020)
  - Councillor: Ir Wan Nasrudin (2018); Halim Md Sohod (2020); Akmal Melan (2022)

Population (2022)
  - Total: 80,000
- Time zone: UTC+8 (MST)
- Postcode: 79200; 79150
- Police: IPD Iskandar Puteri
- Fire: Iskandar Puteri Fire Station

Bandar Nusa Bayu (Jawi: بانـــدر نوســـا بايـــو) or Nusa Bayu, is a township in Iskandar Puteri, Johor Bahru District, Johor, Malaysia. The township is bordered by Setia Eco Gardens and Jelutong Hills forest to the north, Second Link Expressway to the west, Nusajaya Southern Industry Logistic Center (SILC) to the south, and GP Prima Transport Hub to the east. The township is part of the Iskandar Malaysia Flagship B and the Iskandar Puteri Master Plan. Formerly in the Nusajaya Master Plan, Nusa Bayu was known as Nusajaya Industrial Park, together with SILC. The development commenced in 2010 and began to be occupied since 2013 onward.

== Etymology ==
The "Nusa" initial is the standard development name in Iskandar Puteri as per Urban Design Guidelines (UDG) established in 2008. The word is a Sanskrit word derived from the former name of Iskandar Puteri, Nusajaya. The second word "Bayu" is a Malay personification of air. It was named after the geographical profile of Nusa Bayu.

== Development ==
=== Taman Nusa Bayu ===
Taman Nusa Bayu is the first and the main development in Nusa Bayu. It was developed by Nusajaya Height Development Sdn Bhd, a subsidiary of UEM Land, the master developer of Nusajaya (now, Iskandar Puteri).

=== Taman Nusantara Prima ===
Taman Nusantara Prima was developed by Seloga Holdings Bhd. The development is located at the westmost area of Bandar Nusa Bayu and has been occupied since 2016.

=== Taman Bayu Nusantara ===
Taman Bayu Nusantara was developed under the "Rumah Mampu Milik Johor" (Johor Affordable Home) scheme by UEM Sunrise Berhad. The development is located at the eastmost area of Bandar Nusa Bayu and was occupied since 2017.

=== Bayu Angkasa Apartment ===
Bayu Angkasa is a twin medium rise apartment located between the proposed Mosque and Multipurpose Hall in Nusa Bayu at the foot of Jelutong hills. The apartment was developed by UEM Sunrise Berhad and has been occupied since 2018.

== Amenities ==
=== Schools ===
==== Primary education ====
- SK Nusantara (2.5 km)
- SK Pulai (4.3 km)
- Tenby International School (4.5 km)
- SJKC Pai Sze (4.5 km)

==== Secondary education ====
- SMK Nusantara (2.5 km)
- SMK TNJ

==== Tertiary education ====
- Gelang Patah Community College (0 km)
- Malborough College Malaysia (7 km)
- EduCity (8.5 km)
- Universiti of Teknologi Malaysia (UTM) (17 km)

=== Mosque ===
Nusa Bayu Mosque (Malay: Masjid Nusa Bayu) is a proposed mosque in Nusa Bayu next to the Bayu Angkasa Apartments. The plot has been acquired in 2015 by Islamic Religious Council of Johor (Malay: Majlis Agama Islam Johor). Committee for construction of Masjid Nusa Bayu was founded in 2020. In 2021, the Islamic Religious Department of Johor (Malay: Jabatan Agama Islam Negeri Johor) has approved the development plan and was subsequently submitted to Iskandar Puteri City Council for approval the following year in 2022. Funding for the construction of the mosque is being raised through public donation. Upon completion, the mosque will serve as praying hall for 40,000 muslims in Nusa Bayu and surrounding development including workers from industrial area at GP Prima, SILC, IBP, i-Park, Bioexcell, Biocon and i-Tech Valley.

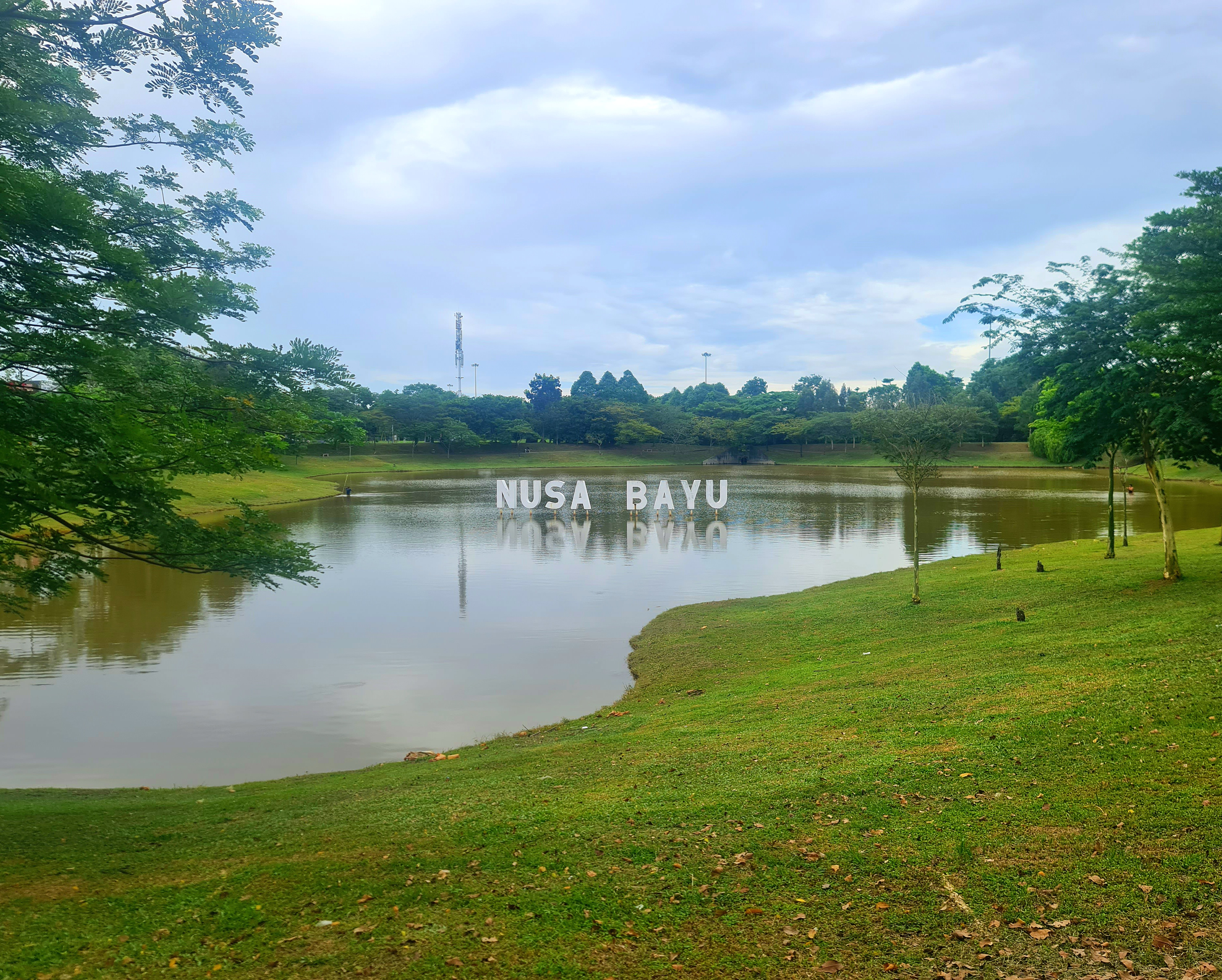
Nusa Bayu Lake Park

=== Recreational areas ===
- Nusa Bayu Lake Park
- Nusa Bayu Valley Park
- Nusa Bayu Hill Park
- Playground
- NS Sport Centre

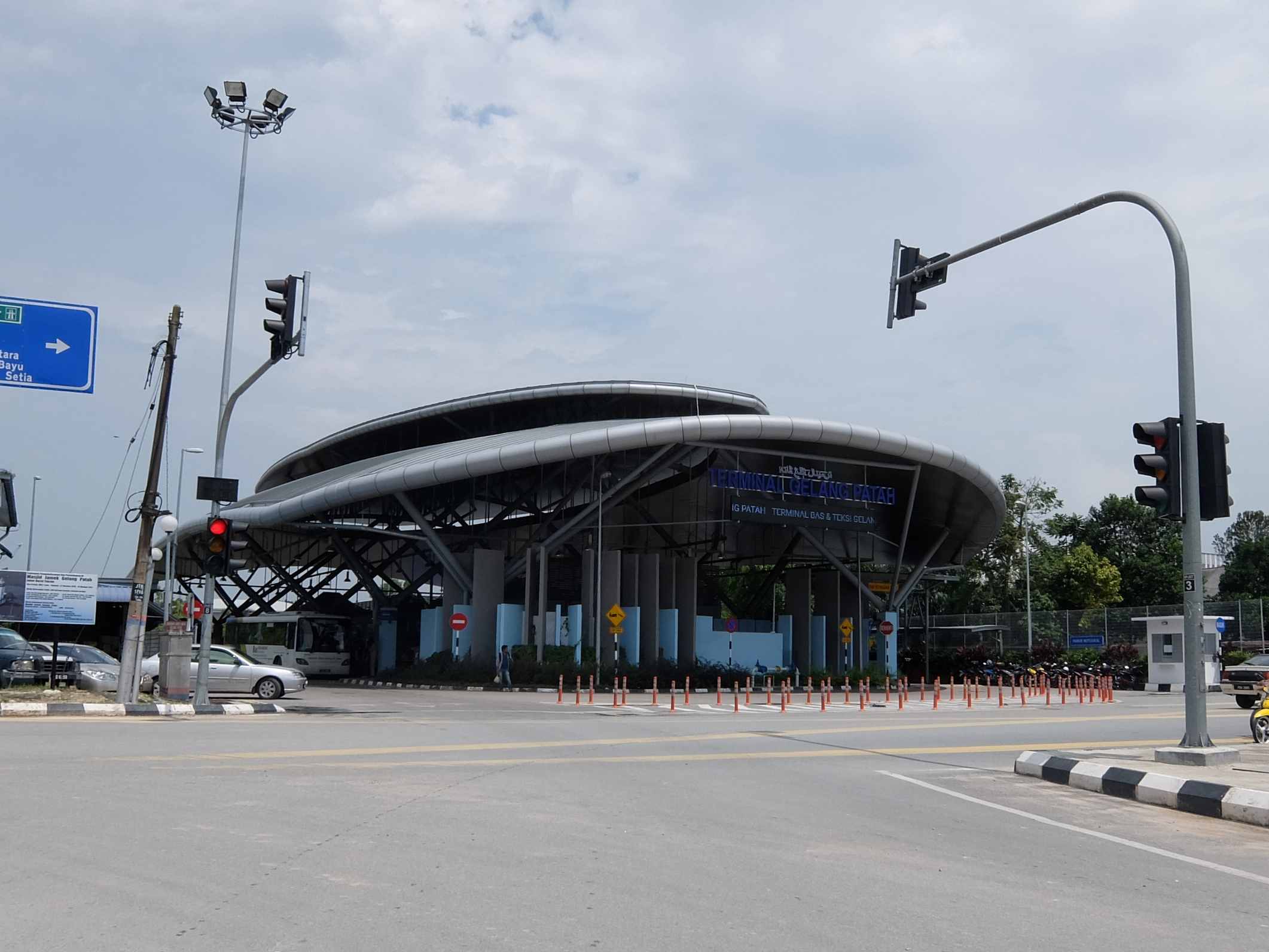
Gelang Patah Terminal

=== Transportation ===
- GP Sentral Bus Terminal (800m)
- Gelang Patah Bus & Taxi Terminal (4 km)

== See also ==
- Iskandar Malaysia
- Iskandar Puteri
- UEM Sunrise
- Kota Iskandar
- Johor Bahru
