= Iskandar Puteri =

- City
- City of Iskandar Puteri Bandaraya Iskandar Puteri (Malay)

Other transcription(s)
  - Jawi: إسكندر ڤوتري
  - Chinese: 依斯干达公主城 (Simplified)
  - Tamil: இஸ்கந்தர் புத்திரி
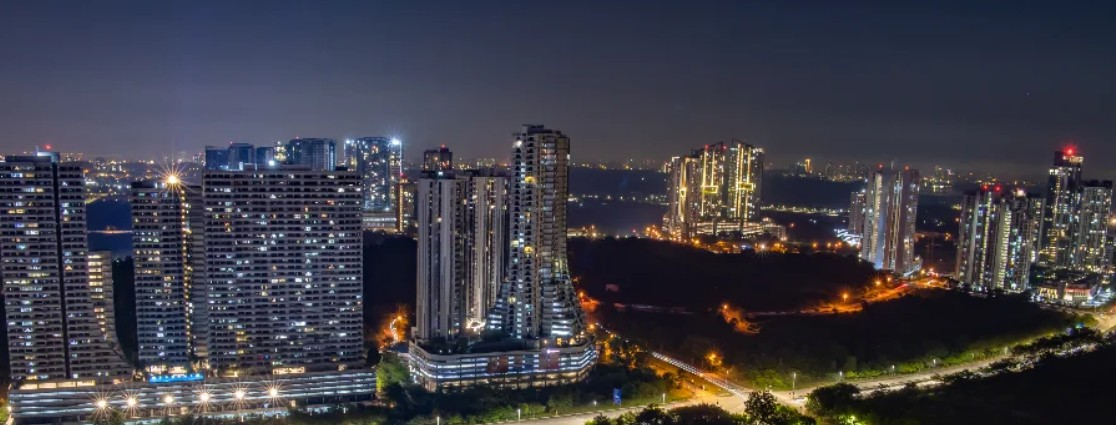
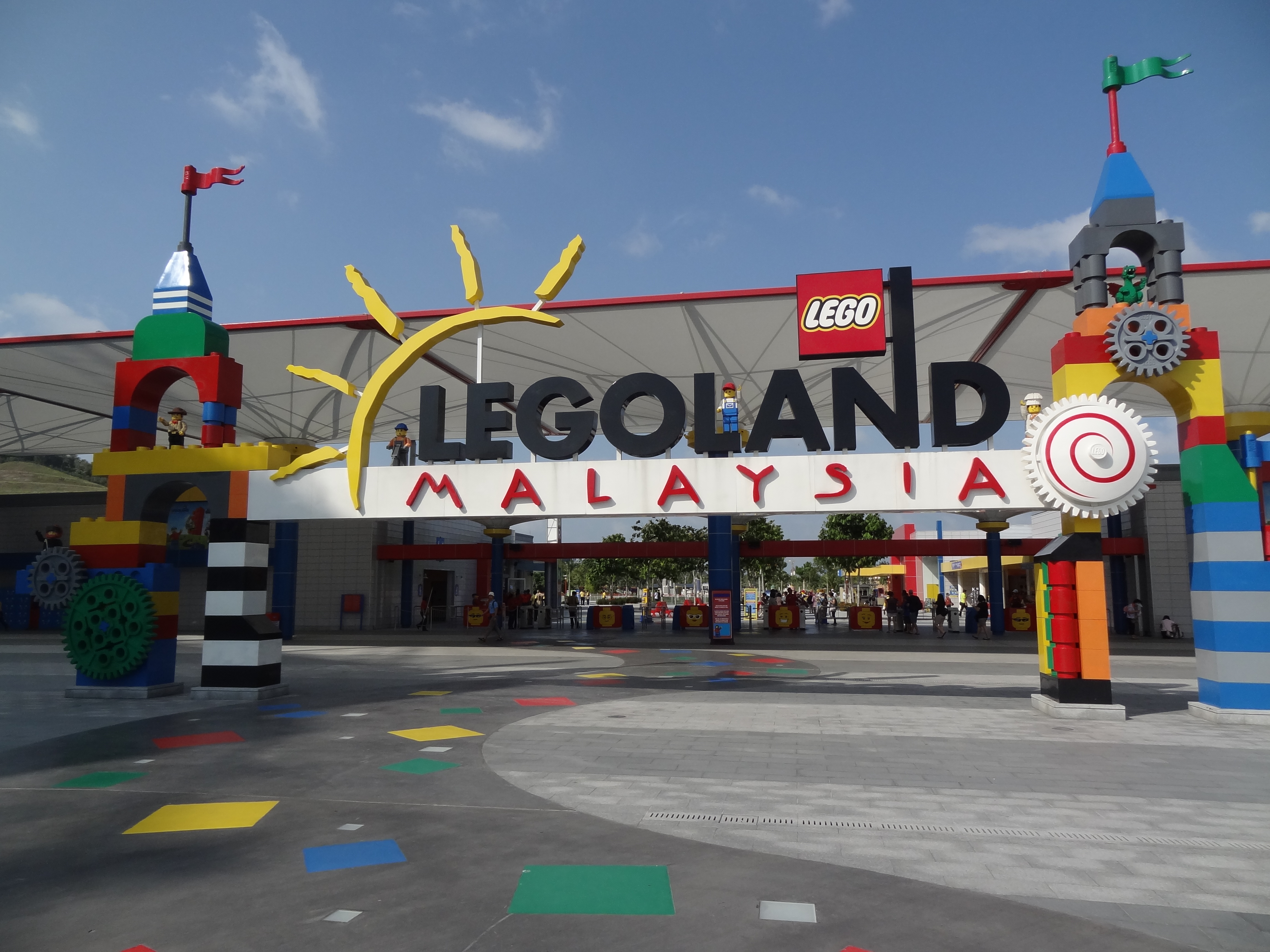
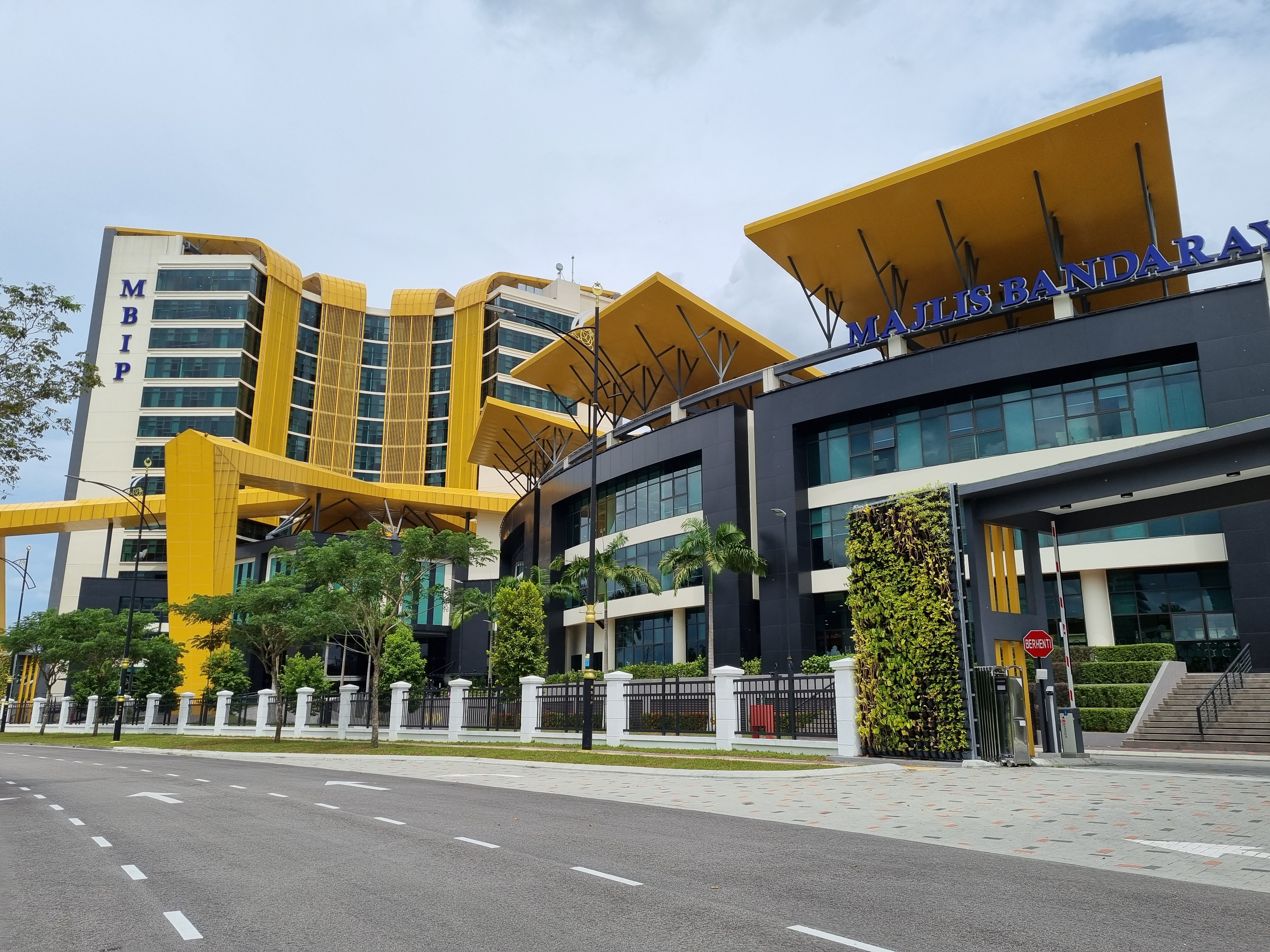
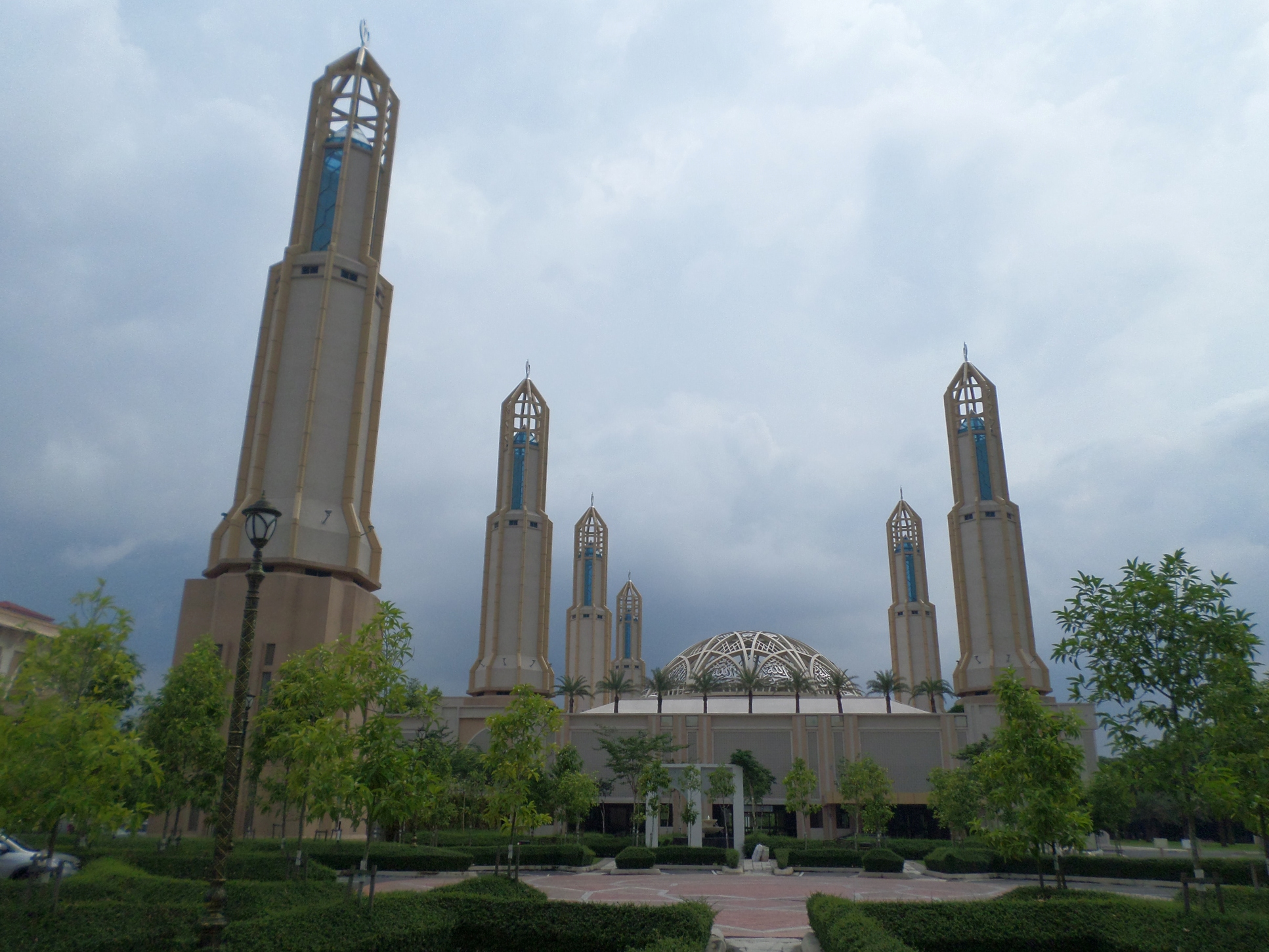
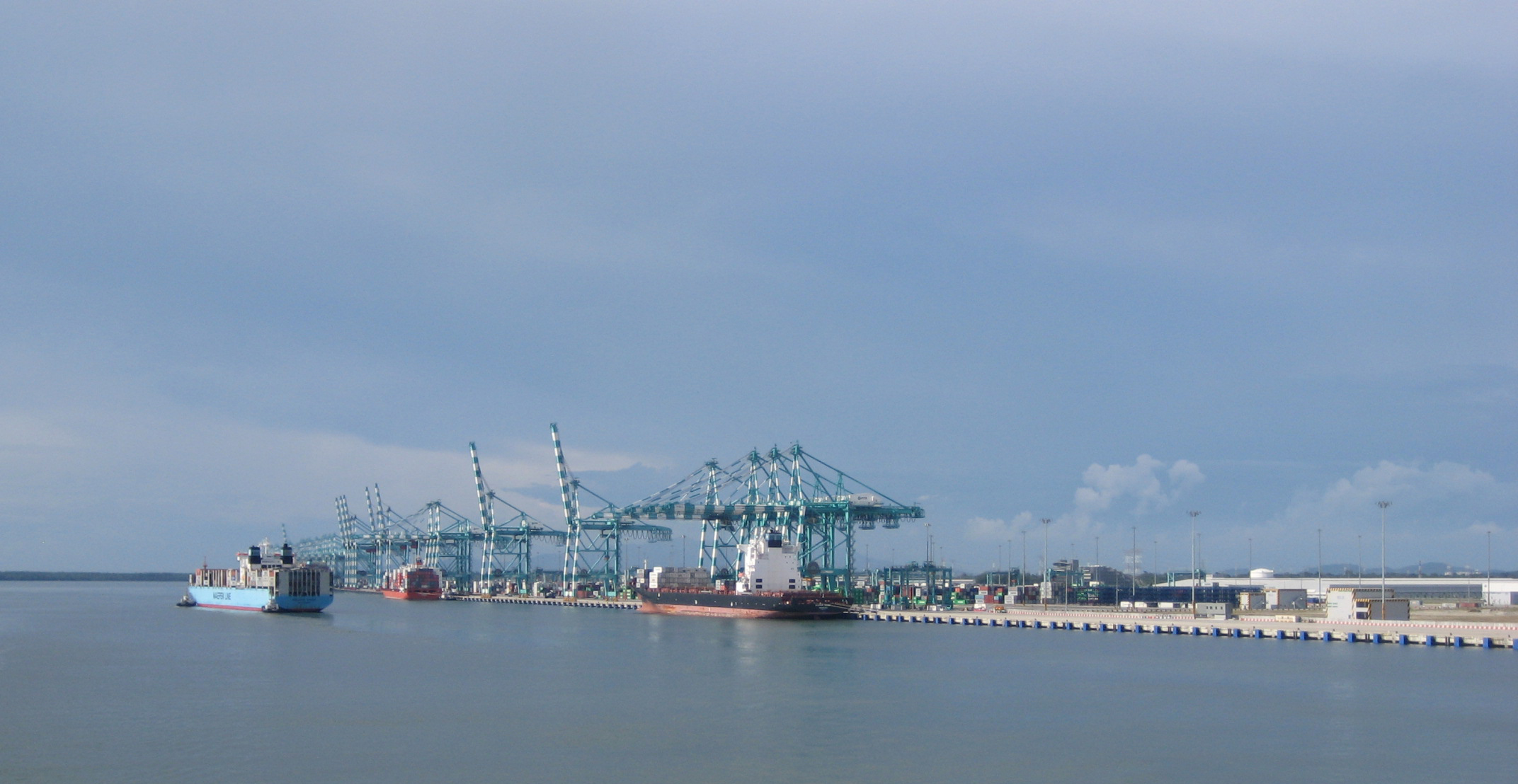
- From top, left to right: Skyline of Iskandar Puteri, Legoland Malaysia Resort, the City Council, the Kota Iskandar Mosque, and the Port of Tanjung Pelepas

- Coat of arms
- Motto: Bersatu Maju (Malay) "United We Progress" (motto of Iskandar Puteri City Council)
- Interactive map of Iskandar Puteri
- Iskandar Puteri in Johor Iskandar Puteri (Malaysia) Iskandar Puteri (Asia) Iskandar Puteri (Earth)
- Coordinates: 01°25′20″N 103°39′00″E
- Country: Malaysia
- State: Johor
- District: Johor Bahru
- Established: 16 April 2009 (as Kota Iskandar)
- City status: 22 November 2017; 8 years ago

Government
  - Type: City council
  - Body: Iskandar Puteri City Council
  - Mayor: Hasrin Kamal Hashim (since 14 July 2025)

Area
  - Total: 367.4 km^{2} (141.9 sq mi)

Population (2020)
  - Total: 575,977 (11th)
  - Density: 1,568/km^{2} (4,060/sq mi)
- Time zone: UTC+8 (Malaysian Standard Time)
  - Summer (DST): Not observed
- Postal code: 79xxx
- Area code(s): +607
- Website: www.mbip.gov.my

Iskandar Puteri (formerly known as Nusajaya) is a city and the administrative capital and de facto capital of the state of Johor, Malaysia. It is situated along the Straits of Johor at the southern end of the Malay Peninsula and the southernmost city of continental Eurasia. Together with the adjacent cities of Johor Bahru and Pasir Gudang, it is located within the Johor Bahru District, the second largest district in Malaysia by population. The 15th busiest container port in the world, Port of Tanjung Pelepas, is also located in the city.

Iskandar Puteri hosts Kota Iskandar, which represents the seat of government of the state of Johor (Executive branch & Legislative branch).

== History ==
=== Sempit Puteri ===
Historically, the area surrounding present-day Iskandar Puteri consisted mostly of fishing villages, populated by Malays and Orang Laut tribes. Located on the western side of the Tebrau Strait, the area was once known as Sempit Puteri (narrow princess) as it was facing the narrowest point of the Tebrau Straits.

In 1855, when Temenggong Daeng Ibrahim won his claim over the Johor throne, he relocated the capital city of the now-divided kingdom from Telok Blangah (Singapore) to Tanjung Puteri and renamed it Iskandar Puteri. His son Maharaja Abu Bakar, the first Sultan of modern Johor, renamed Tanjung Puteri to Johor Bahru upon his coronation in 1868 to distinguish his dynasty from the old Sultanate of Johor.

During Abu Bakar's reign, Jaafar Muhammad was appointed as the first Menteri Besar of Johor. According to a story from Johor Heritage Foundation (Malay: Yayasan Warisan Johor), during his journey to Sempit Puteri, the paddle of the sampan that Dato Jaafar was boarding broke. That event gave the place its new name Gelang Patah (broken paddle).

=== Johor Bahru Tengah ===
As many as eight local councils (majlis tempatan) were set up in the 1950s and 1960s to oversee municipal works in what would become the Johor Bahru Tengah or Central Johor Bahru District then rural areas (not to be confused with Johor Bahru Town Centre, now City Centre, which is also called Central Johor Bahru). The smaller local councils were merged on 1 March 1978 to form the Johor Bahru Tengah District Council (Malay: Majlis Daerah Johor Bahru Tengah, MDJBT), as the local authority in Johor Bahru District's central rural areas. The former local council areas of Skudai, Lima Kedai, Gelang Patah, Kangkar Pulai and Ulu Choh made up the western part of Johor Bahru Tengah, while that of Ulu Tiram, Plentong and Masai made up the eastern part. Johor Bahru Tengah was granted municipal status in 2001, with its local authority upgraded as the Johor Bahru Tengah Municipal Council (Malay: Majlis Perbandaran Johor Bahru Tengah, MPJBT).

On the other hand, the former Johor Bahru Municipal Council (MPJB) – predecessor of the present Johor Bahru City Council (MBJB) administered Johor Bahru Town and its surrounding urban areas (also known as South Johor Bahru District), which later became Johor Bahru City on 1 January 1994. Another small portion of Plentong and the whole of Sungai Tiram mukims (then Southeast Johor Bahru District), were governed by the Pasir Gudang Local Authority, a privately-owned subsidiary of state entreprise Johor Corporation (JCORP). Kulai (by extension present-day Kulai District area), also a part of Johor Bahru District and known as North Johor Bahru District at the time, was governed by a separate District Council (now Kulai Municipal Council) since 1 January 1976.

=== Nusajaya Township ===
In 1993, during the leadership of the fourth Prime Minister Mahathir Mohamad, a plan for a second bridge connecting the Peninsular Malaysia and Singapore was brought forward by Halim Saad. Saad was a young entrepreneur who built Malaysia's longest highway, North-South Expressway, and apprentice to the former Minister of Finance Daim Zainuddin. The cabinet approved the project, as the traffic at the then Johor Causeway was already over-congested. The Second Link has connected Iskandar Puteri to Tuas in Singapore. His past experience enabled Halim to secure financing from Bank for Renong Berhad (now UEM Group) to acquire vast land along with the Second Link for a new township which was eventually deemed Nusajaya. The Nusajaya name was given by former Menteri Besar of Johor, Muhyiddin Yassin.

UEM Group through its subsidiary UEM Land (now UEM Sunrise) continue to develop Nusajaya in West Johor Bahru District as the new city centre of Johor. A new administrative centre, Kota Iskandar was developed by Cahaya Jauhar in Nusajaya based on the Federal Government administrative centre at Putrajaya as a catalyst development for the city centre. This is followed by the introduction of Iskandar Malaysia, Iskandar Regional Development Authority and Iskandar Investment Board to regulate and promote the development growth in Nusajaya. In 2008, the Johor State Parliament was moved from Sultan Ibrahim Building in Johor Bahru to Sultan Ismail Building in Kota Iskandar. Several other catalyst developments were later added to Nusajaya. Among them are Legoland Malaysia Resort, Puteri Harbour and Pinewood Malaysia Studio (now Iskandar Malaysia Studio) and Southern Industrial And Logistics Clusters (SiLC). A new city, Medini was also developed as the capital for Nusajaya. UEM also sold part of Nusajaya land to other developers including Syed Mokhtar Albukhary's Tradewind, SP Setia (Bukit Indah & Setia Eco Garden), Ecoworld (Eco Botanic), and Sunway Group (Sunway Iskandar) to speed up the development of Nusajaya.

=== Iskandar Puteri ===
By 31 December 2015, the municipality's area had increased to 560.71 km^{2}, as Nusajaya township develops rapidly since the start of the project. But the Johor State Government, on a 2 July 2014 meeting, decided to transfer some parts of Tebrau and Plentong Mukims (or former local council areas of Ulu Tiram, Plentong and Masai) to Johor Bahru City Council and Pasir Gudang Municipal Council (later became Pasir Gudang City Council) respectively through a redelineation exercise of Kulai and Johor Bahru District Municipalities which took effect on 1 January 2016. This shrank the border of the Johor Bahru Tengah municipality to only its Western portion (measuring 402.96 square kilometres (155.58 sq mi)), which became the Iskandar Puteri City area on 22 November 2017, reusing Johor Bahru's old name. The erstwhile Johor Bahru Tengah Municipal Council was also upgraded into the Iskandar Puteri City Council that very same day and is now headed by a mayor.

== Government ==
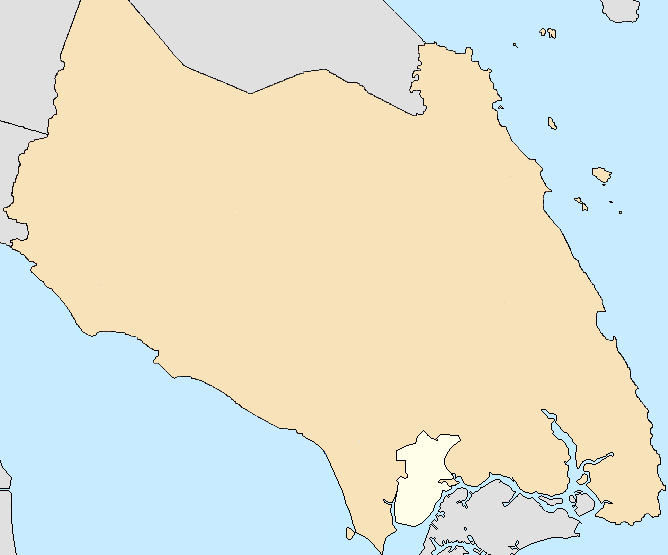
Locations of Iskandar Puteri and its suburbs

Iskandar Puteri is Johor's second city, and Malaysia's 14th. It is administered by its local authority – Iskandar Puteri City Council currently headquartered in Kota Iskandar, the administrative centre for the government of Johor State. The Johor State Legislative Assembly, Johor Chief Minister's Office, and Mahkota Square are also located in this town. The city council is headed by mayor Hasrin Kamal Hashim, who took office since 14 July 2025.

Due to electoral division by Election Commission of Malaysia, there are four parliamentary and eight state constituencies (DUN) dividing the Iskandar Puteri area. There are (P161) Pulai parliamentary seat, (N46) and (P162) Iskandar Puteri parliamentary seat. Eight state seats are Perling state seat; (N48) Skudai state seat and (N49) Kota Iskandar state seat along with partial Kulai (Bukit Batu for Ulu Choh and Senai for UTM) and Tebrau (Puteri Wangsa for Maju Jaya).

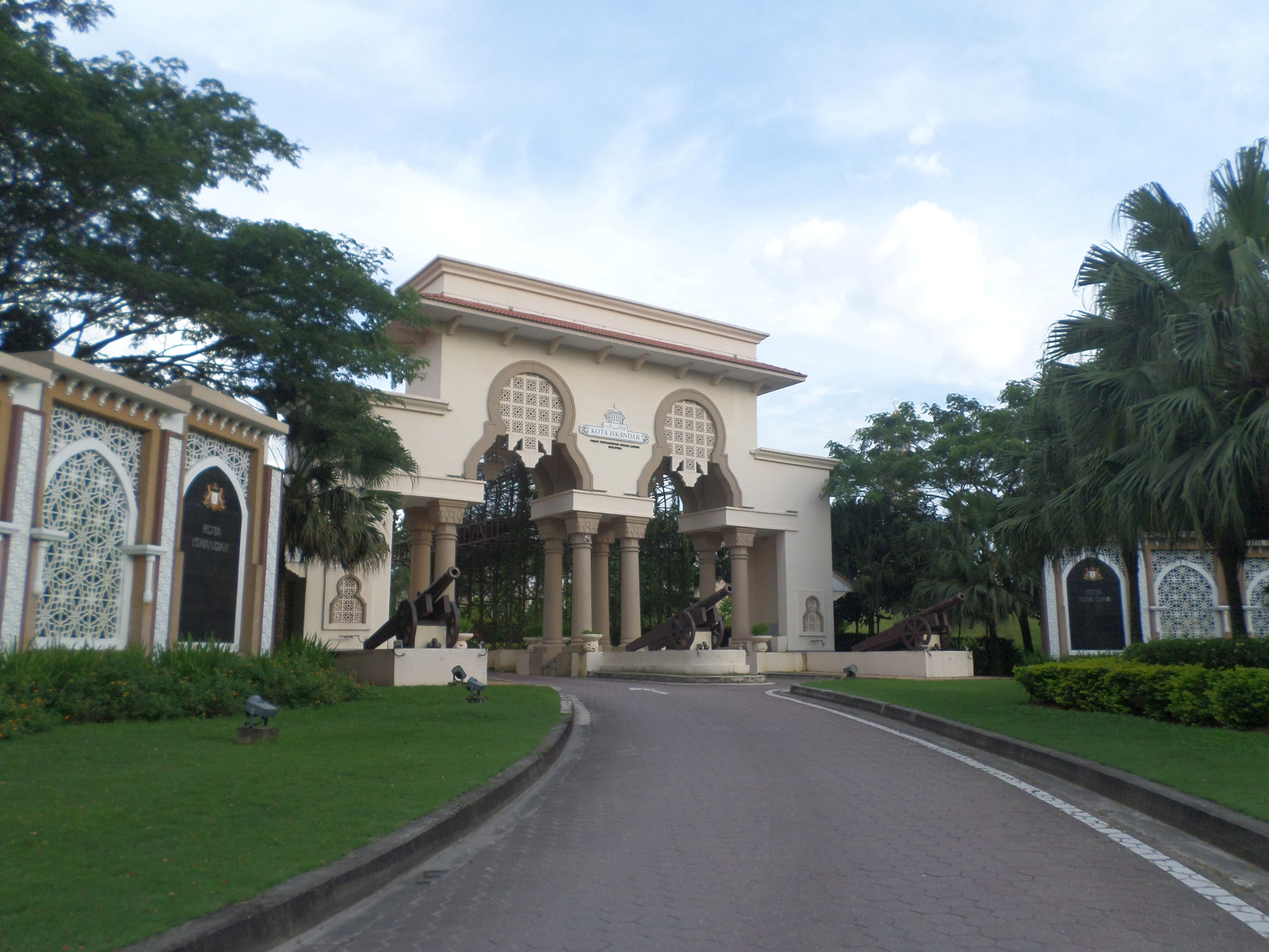
Kota Iskandar

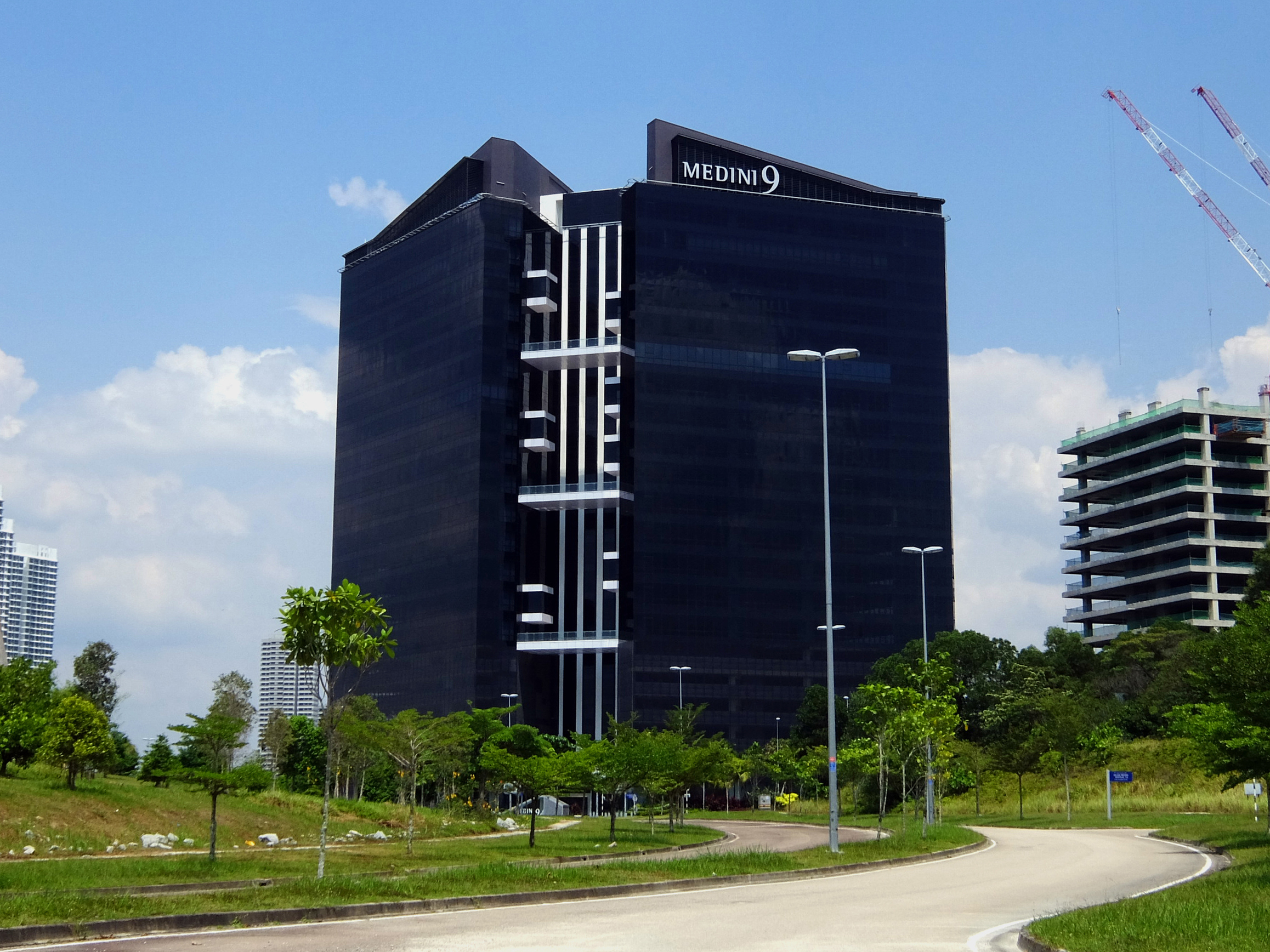
Medini 9, Medini Iskandar

== Demographics ==
Iskander Puteri is the second largest city in Johor. As of 2020, the municipal area of Iskandar Puteri has a population of 575,597. It ranks as the 13th most populous urban centre in Malaysia (2020).

The following is based on Department of Statistics Malaysia 2020 census.

Ethnic groups in Iskandar Puteri, 2020
Ethnicity	Population	Percentage
Malaysian Bumiputera (Malays and Other Natives)	199,031	44.46%
Malaysian Chinese	164,815	36.81%
Malaysian Indian	51,739	12.4%
Other Malaysian	1,669	0.37%
Non-Malaysian	30,443	6.80%

== Education ==
EduCity is a 600-acre (2.4 km^{2}) educational area, consisting of the

- University of Southampton Malaysia Campus
- Newcastle University Medicine Malaysia
- University of Reading
- Multimedia University
- Raffles University
- Netherlands Maritime Institute of Technology
- Management Development Institute of Singapore
- Stellar International School
- Marlborough College Malaysia
- Raffles American School
- Sunway International School Johor

Other universities in the city outside of EduCity are

- University of Technology, Malaysia
- Southern University College

== Medical ==
Afiat Healthpark was initially developed as the medical hub for Iskandar Puteri. Columbia Asia Iskandar Puteri was the first hospital to be built in the city, followed by Gleneagles Medini and Kensington Specialist Centre.

== Industry ==
Concurrent with the development of Iskandar Puteri, a new proposal to build a new port at the west coast of Johor was brought forward by the then State Secretary, Dato Ayob Mion. The new port, Port of Tanjung Pelepas was developed near the Second Link and caused the industrial development at the Tanjung Kupang area in the west of Iskandar Puteri.

Later, UEM also developed Southern Industry and Logistic Cluster (SiLC) which hosts i-Park SiLC, IBP, Bio-excell and iTech Valley. SILC also hosts the largest insulin producer in Asia, Biocon and Insulet. This is followed by Nusa Cemerlang and Nusajaya Techpark at the adjacent land at Gelang Patah.

== Tourism ==
Puteri Harbour, covering a land area of 278 hectares (688 acres), and Forest City is a marina development that spans 687 acres (2.8 km^{2}) on the Straits of Johor. The area previously included attractions such as Sanrio Hello Kitty Town and Thomas Town.

Legoland Malaysia Resort is a 5,500,000 sq ft (510,000 m^{2}) integrated complex containing the Legoland Malaysia Resort and Legoland Water Park theme parks, plus a lifestyle retail centre, offices, hotels, service apartments and residential units. The main theme park includes 70 hands-on rides, slides, shows distributed among the LEGO Technic, LEGO Kingdoms, Imagination, Land of Adventure, Lego City and Minliand areas.

Kampung Sungai Melayu is an eco-tourism village located in Gelang Patah, offering mangrove tours, traditional village atmosphere, and local river experiences. The local boat tour route starts from the Kampung Sungai Melayu Eco-Tourism Jetty and navigates through mangrove swamps, traditional crab-catching locations, and floating green mussel aquaculture cages.

Beyond the inner mangrove cruise, extended river cruises travel along the Tebrau Strait towards Danga Bay and Johor Bahru, passing key coastal landmarks including the Orang Asli Seletar village, Country Garden Danga Bay, Dataran Bandaraya Johor Bahru, the JDT Training Centre at Sri Gelam, Sultan Abu Bakar State Mosque, and the Johor State Islamic Religious Department. The standard mangrove boat tour operates daily except Fridays from 9:00 am to 4:30 pm, with ticket fares priced at RM 45 for adult citizens and RM 22 for child citizens, while fares for non-citizens are RM 60 for adults and RM 30 for children. In addition, local Johor cuisine such as spicy asam pedas and fresh seafood is available at the village's Restoran Sri Pantai Asam Pedas, which opens daily from 11:00 am to 10:00 pm.

== Iskandar Puteri residences ==
Townships such as Nusa Bayu, Gerbang Nusajaya, Setia Eco Gardens, Nusa Sentral, Taman Universiti, Nusa Indah, Taman Nusa Bestari Jaya, Bestari Heights, East Ledang, Estuari, Ledang Heights, Nusa Idaman, Nusa Bayu, Nusa Bestari, Nusa Bestari 2, Nusa Duta, Bukit Indah, Horizon Hills and Sunway Iskandar are located within this zone.

== Transportation ==
=== Sea ===
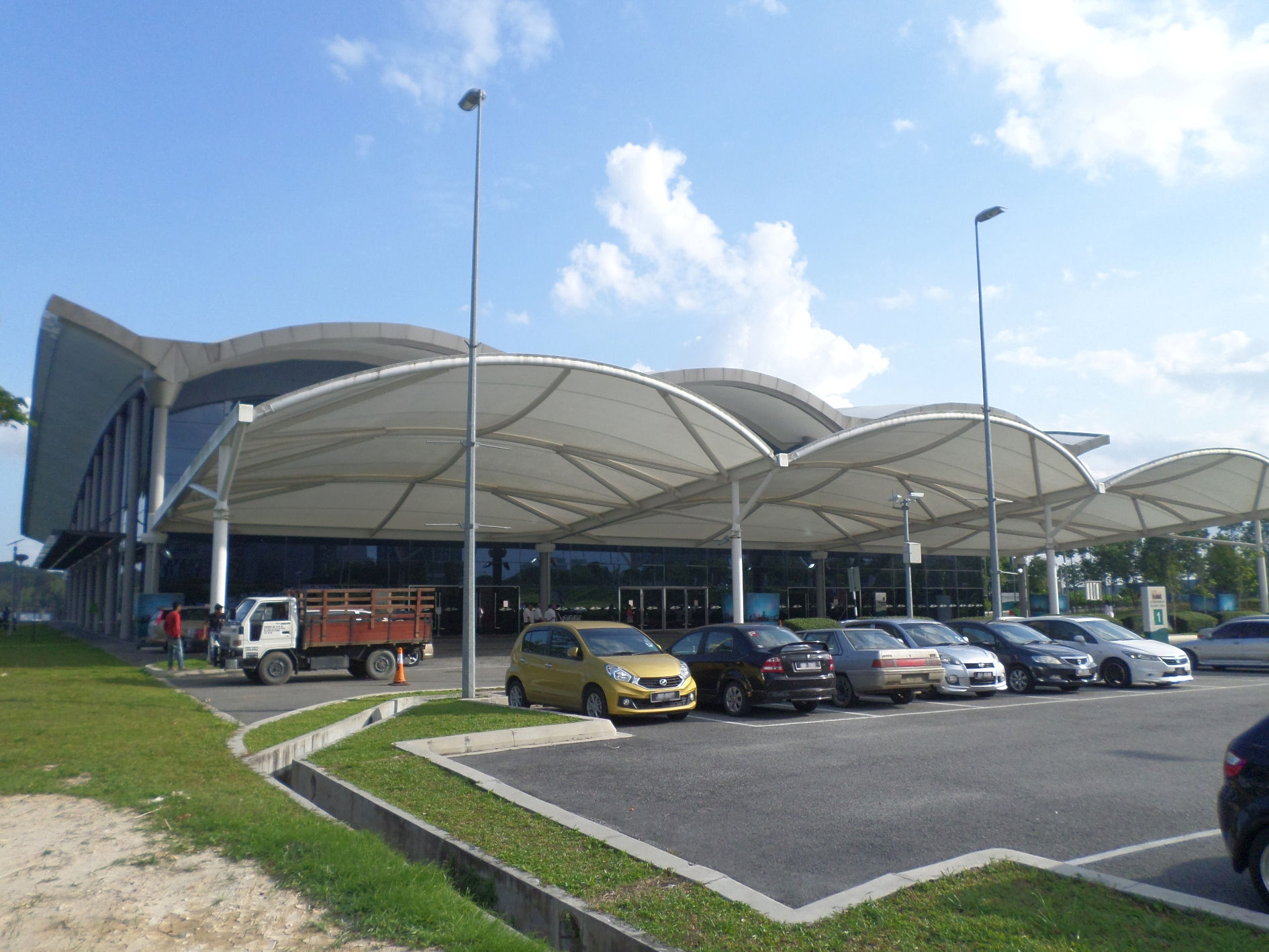
Puteri Harbour International Ferry Terminal

The Port of Tanjung Pelepas, which ranks as Malaysia's largest container port since 2004, lies on the western side of the city. It is the 19th busiest container port in the world as of 2013. Iskandar Puteri also houses the Puteri Harbour International Ferry Terminal, with routes to cities in Indonesia.

=== Road ===
Within Johor, the Iskandar Coastal Highway and Pasir Gudang Highway link the city to Johor Bahru City, while the Tanjung Kupang Road links the city to Pontian District. The Second Link Expressway and North–South Expressway connect the city to the other states in Peninsular Malaysia.

The Malaysia–Singapore Second Link was built between Kampong Ladang at Tanjung Kupang, Johor and Jalan Ahmad Ibrahim at Tuas, Singapore. The bridge was built to reduce the traffic congestion at the Johor–Singapore Causeway and was opened to traffic on 2 January 1998. The twin-deck bridge supports a dual-three lane carriageway and its total length over water is 1,920 m.

== See also ==
- Cahaya Jauhar, the Developer of Kota Iskandar
- UEM Land (now UEM Sunrise), Master Developer of Iskandar Puteri
- Kota Iskandar, Johor, the Johor State administrative center
- Medini Iskandar Malaysia, the capital city of Iskandar Puteri
- Nusa Bayu
