= East Ledang =

Human settlement in Malaysia

Coordinates: 1°25′09.8″N 103°36′56.7″E

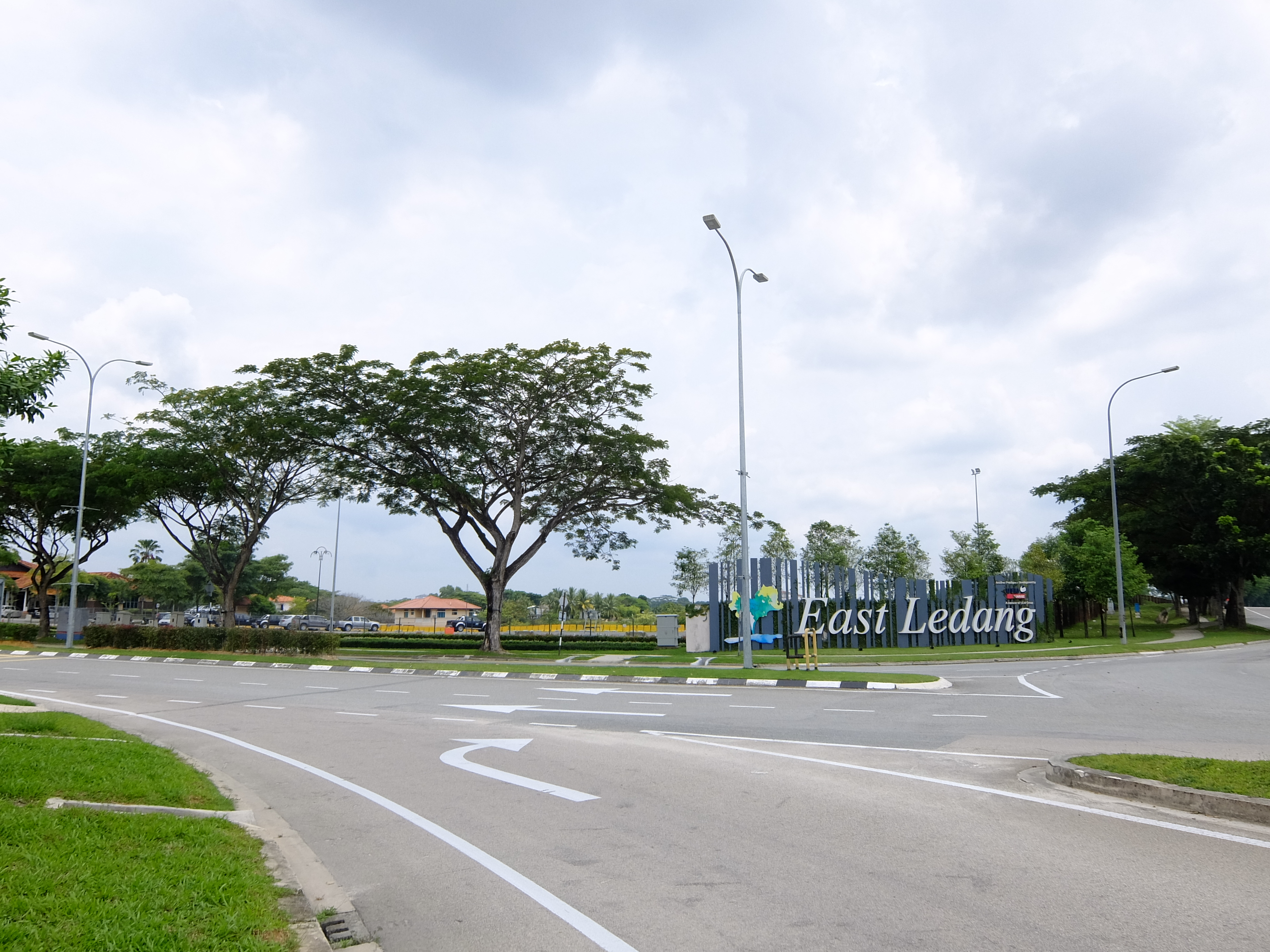
East Ledang

East Ledang is a township in Iskandar Puteri, Johor Bahru District, Johor, Malaysia. Developed by UEM Sunrise Berhad (the property development arm of Kazanah Nasional Berhad - an investment holding company of the Government of Malaysia). It has townhouses, link duplexes, twin villas and bungalows.

Nearby towns include Bukit Indah and Gelang Patah.
