= Gerbang Nusajaya =

Township in Iskandar Puteri, Johor, Malaysia

Gerbang Nusajaya is a township in Iskandar Puteri, Johor, Malaysia. The site is the second phase of development of Iskandar Puteri and is being developed over a 25-year period by Malaysian firm UEM Sunrise Berhad.

Major projects in Gerbang Nusajaya include a Science park, a motorsports hub, and mixed commercial and residential properties.

The development is expected to house a population of 220,000 and to create 76,000 direct and 137,000 indirect jobs. The proposed Kuala Lumpur–Singapore high-speed rail Iskandar Puteri HSR Station will be built here.

== Nusajaya Tech Park ==
In October 2012, Singapore's Ascendas Land International Pte Ltd and UEM subsidiary UEM Land Holdings set up a 60:40 joint venture to develop a $1.2 billion 519-acre industrial park in Nusajaya. The park will be developed in three phases over nine years and will host 34,000 businesspeople across electronics, pharmaceuticals, food processing, engineering, FMCG and logistics. It is due for completion in 2023.

In March 2015, Telekom Malaysia Berhad partnered with Nusajaya Tech Park Sdn Bhd to develop a data centre, ICT infrastructure and smart services on the site.

== FASTrack Iskandar ==
In December 2012 it was announced that Singapore firm FASTrack Autosports Pte Ltd and UEM Land Holdings would develop a RM3.5 billion motorsports hub in Gerbang Nusajaya, due for completion in 2016. The central feature of the hub is a $100 million 4.5 km F1-grade circuit designed by German racetrack designer Hermann Tilke.

== Mixed property ==
In February 2014 UEM Sunrise and Malaysian plantation firm Kuala Lumpur Kepong Berhad (KLK) announced a RM5 billion joint venture to develop residential and commercial property on 500 acres of land in Gerbang Nusajaya.
