= Mosque of Kota Iskandar =

Mosque in Johor Bahru, Johor, Malaysia

Kota Iskandar Mosque
- Masjid Kota Iskandar مسجد كوتا إسكندر
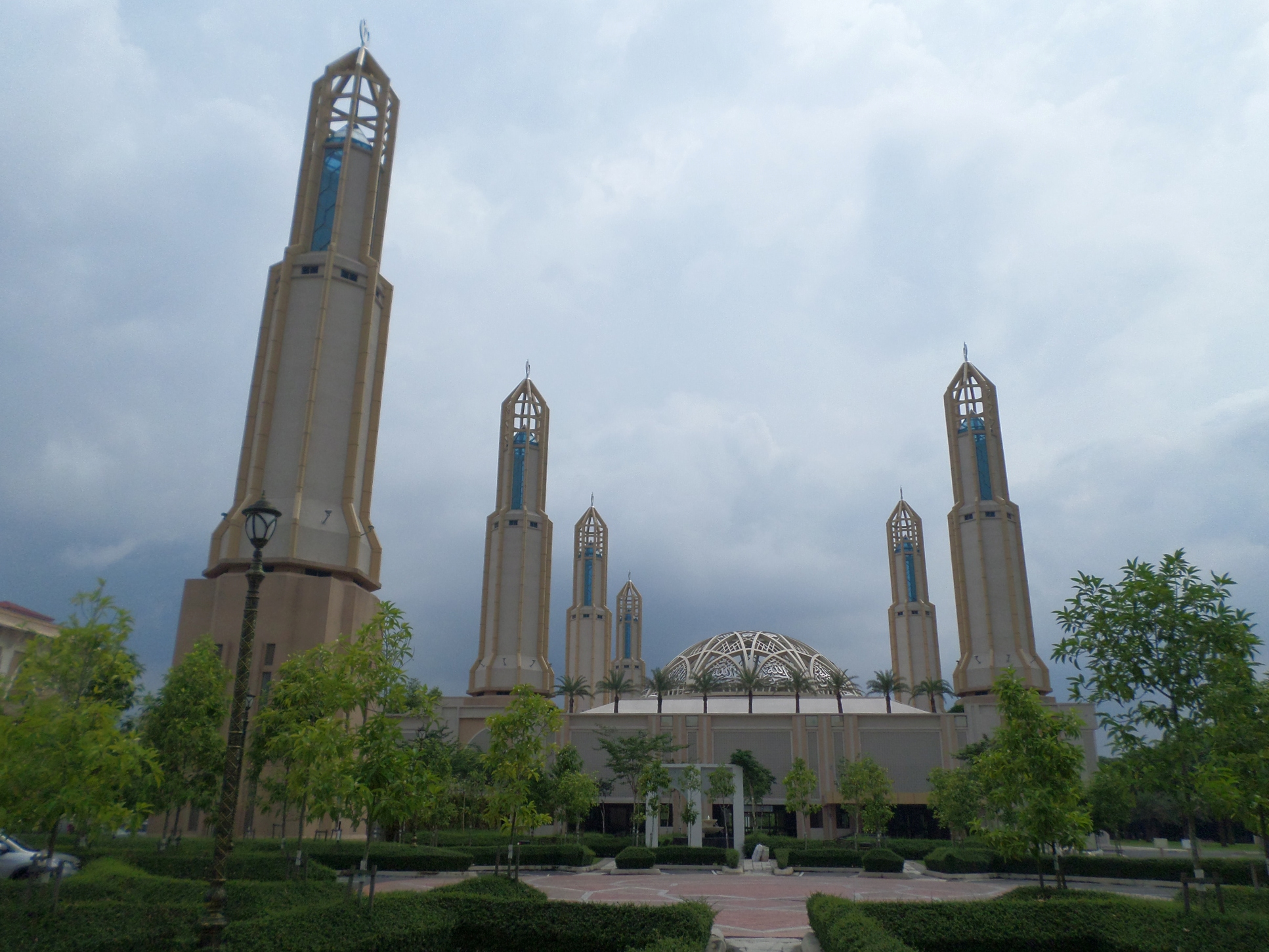

- Location within Johor

Religion
- Affiliation: Islam
- Governing body: Johor State religious Affair Department
- Patron: Cahaya Jauhar (Developer)

Location
- Location: Kota Iskandar
- Municipality: Iskandar Puteri
- State: Johor
- Country: Malaysia
- Interactive map of Kota Iskandar Mosque
- Coordinates: 1°25′26.4″N 103°38′55.2″E

Architecture
- Architects: Kinta Samudera (PMC); Kumpulan Seni Reka (Architect); Perunding Padureka (C&S); Juru & Teras Bersekutu (M&E); Invenzioni (ID); Clouston Design Studio (Landscape); ARH Juruukur Bahan (QS)
- Type: Mosque
- Style: Moorish architecture
- Funded by: State Economy Planning Unit; CJ Bina Maju
- General contractor: UEM Construction (Foundation); Pembinaan Mitrajaya (Building); Tycotech (Minaret); Integra (ID); Impian Landscape
- Groundbreaking: 2012
- Completed: 2015
- Construction cost: USD 13,000,000

Specifications
- Direction of façade: Qiblat Axis
- Capacity: 1600 (indoor); 800 (terrace corridor); 2800 (courtyard); 1200(dome garden)
- Dome: 1 skeletal dome with roof garden
- Minaret: 6 minarets to represent pillars of faith
- Site area: 14,000 square meter
- Inscriptions: Quranic Verses

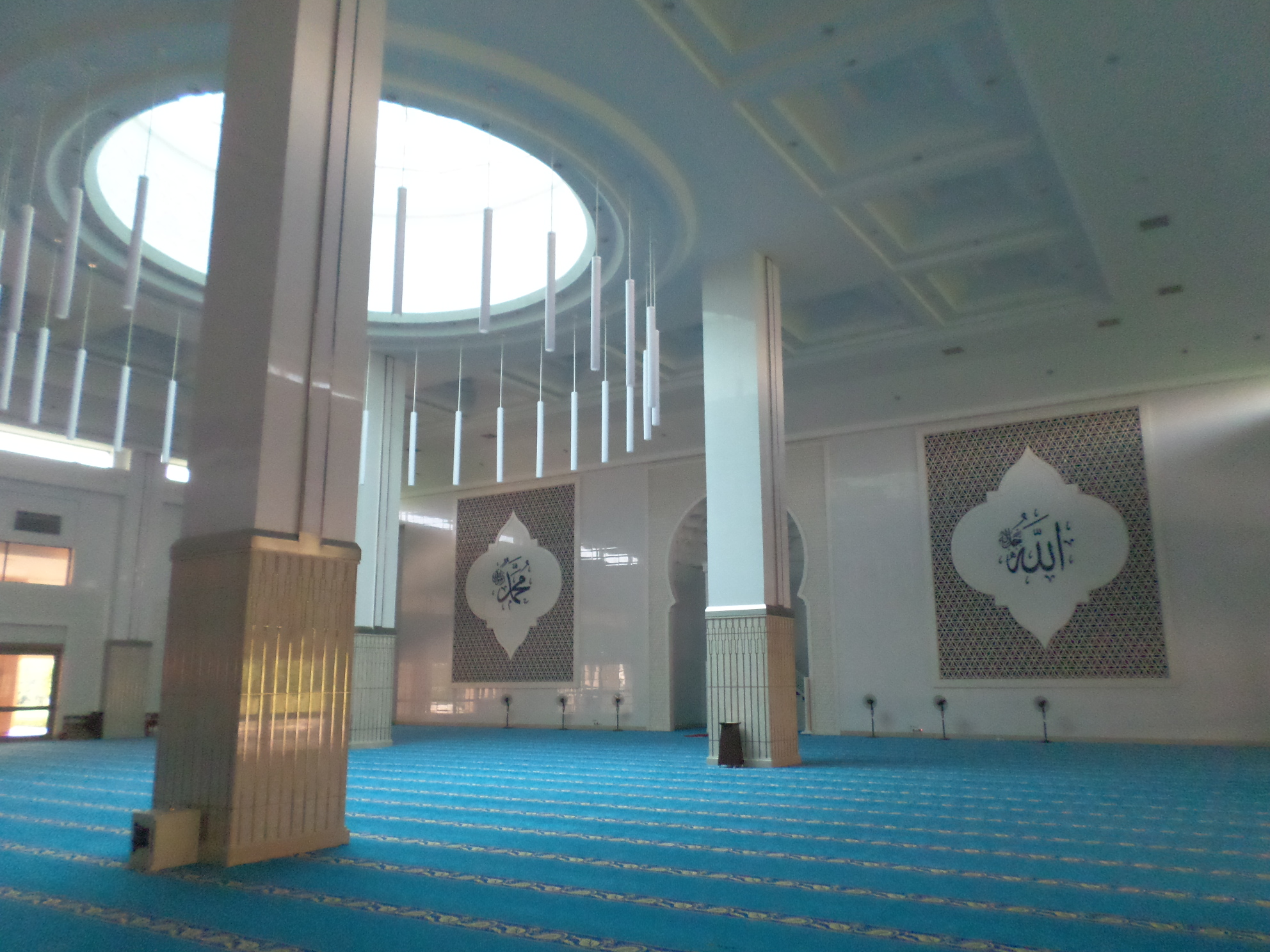
Kota Iskandar Mosque prayer hall

The Mosque of Kota Iskandar (Malay: Masjid Kota Iskandar) is a Johor state mosque located at Kota Iskandar, Iskandar Puteri, a Johor State Administrative Centre at Johor Bahru District, Johor, Malaysia. It is the second state mosque of Johor after Sultan Abu Bakar State Mosque in Johor Bahru. This modern futuristic mosque was officially opened on 16 June 2015 and was named after the late 24th and fourth sultan of Johor, Almarhum Sultan Iskandar ibni Almarhum Sultan Ismail.

== History ==
An agreement was made between the State Government of Johor Darul Ta’zim, Johor State Secretary Incorporated and Cahaya Jauhar Sdn Bhd to develop a mosque at kota Iskandar.

== Design ==
The mosque as designated in the Master Plan sits in the Parcel Q1M (approximately 7.7 acres) of the Government Precinct. Located along the Qiblat Axis, the mosque is positioned to front the landmark buildings of the DNJ and MBSSC within the Central Precinct. The six minarets shall form the greeting statement, thus a gateway landmark, from the western approach to the Government Precinct.

The mosque design is being developed by the architect as a 'Garden Mosque', surrounded by Islamic gardens with water features, scented plants and shaded trees. The interplay of green spaces with water elements forms the prevailing urban fabric of the mosque ground. The outdoor landscaped area shall be suitable for praying spill over as well as large gatherings such as 'Maulidul Rasul' function.

The mosque can accommodate a Prayer Hall for 1520 'jemaah', with spill over area on the terrace for 730 'jemaah' and 3720 'jemaah' at the roof garden and Islamic garden on the right and left courtyard of the mosque. Facilities for 'Imam' and 'Bilal' shall be provided such as administration office with 'holding' or retreat room. In addition, the mosque shall also form an activity centre for Islamic functions such as 'Pusat Ilmiah' with Multi-Purpose Hall for seminar, etc., Library and Counselling Room. The outdoor landscaped area shall also be suitable for large gatherings such as 'Maulidul Rasul' function.

The mosque will be a unique 'Garden Mosque', not just a place for ritual gatherings but it is a reminiscent of a large pavilion ('wakaf') in the garden. The surrounding garden ('laman') will allow large gatherings or functions, as well as serve as an overflow praying area. The nature, the lush green and the water in these spaces will remind us of His Greatness and of His Presence.

The architectural presence of the mosque is consistent with DNJ (architecture and colour scheme), humble and discreet yet powerful in creating the termination point for the DNJ building. The building shall allow visual and spatial linkages of the landscape elements surrounding it and allow pedestrian permeability along the 'Qiblat' axis connecting the Dataran Mahkota to the mosque through an arcade named 'Siar Jauhar' which is at the first floor level of the DNJ via a link bridge.

The six numbers of minarets symbolically suggest the six 'Rukun Iman' which is the key to Islamic belief. The minarets serve as landmark and a place where 'Mu’azzin' call for prayer. The concept design of the minaret derives from the idea of a light tower. Light or 'Nur' in Islam being special and meaningful, is designed to glow from the top of the minarets, accentuate the powerful calling of the Almighty at nighttime.

The interior of the mosque shall have the ambience of balanced natural and indoor lighting to avoid a sombre atmosphere, by means of skylight in the Main Prayer Hall. The skeletal dome framed over a glass roof shall form as a sun-shading device while casting an interplay of light and shadow underneath. The interior of the mosque shall have the ambience of the Alhambra architecture, enhancing Quranic verses with Islamic motifs in the detailing of the internal wall.

VIPs shall lead their cars to the VIP drop-off and to a designated parking area. A separate service lane and access is provided for the delivery of goods to the building, thus assuring clear separation of public and service routes. Services and maintenance personnel shall access the areas via designated service corridors and staircases.

Careful consideration shall be given to local climatic conditions to achieve the maximum in comfort with the least amount of expenditure and minimizing the cost for future maintenance.

== Award ==
Malaysia Landscape Architecture Award 2017 – Special Honour Award

== See also ==
- Islam in Malaysia
- Kota Iskandar
- Iskandar Puteri
- Iskandar Malaysia
- Johor
