= SMA House =

Building in Singapore

Coordinates: 1.2989°N 103.8441°E

The SMA House, formerly known as the Malayan Motors Showroom, is a former Malayan Motors car showroom on Orchard Road. In 1987, the Singapore Manufacturer's Association moved into the building, followed by the Management Development Institute of Singapore in 2002.

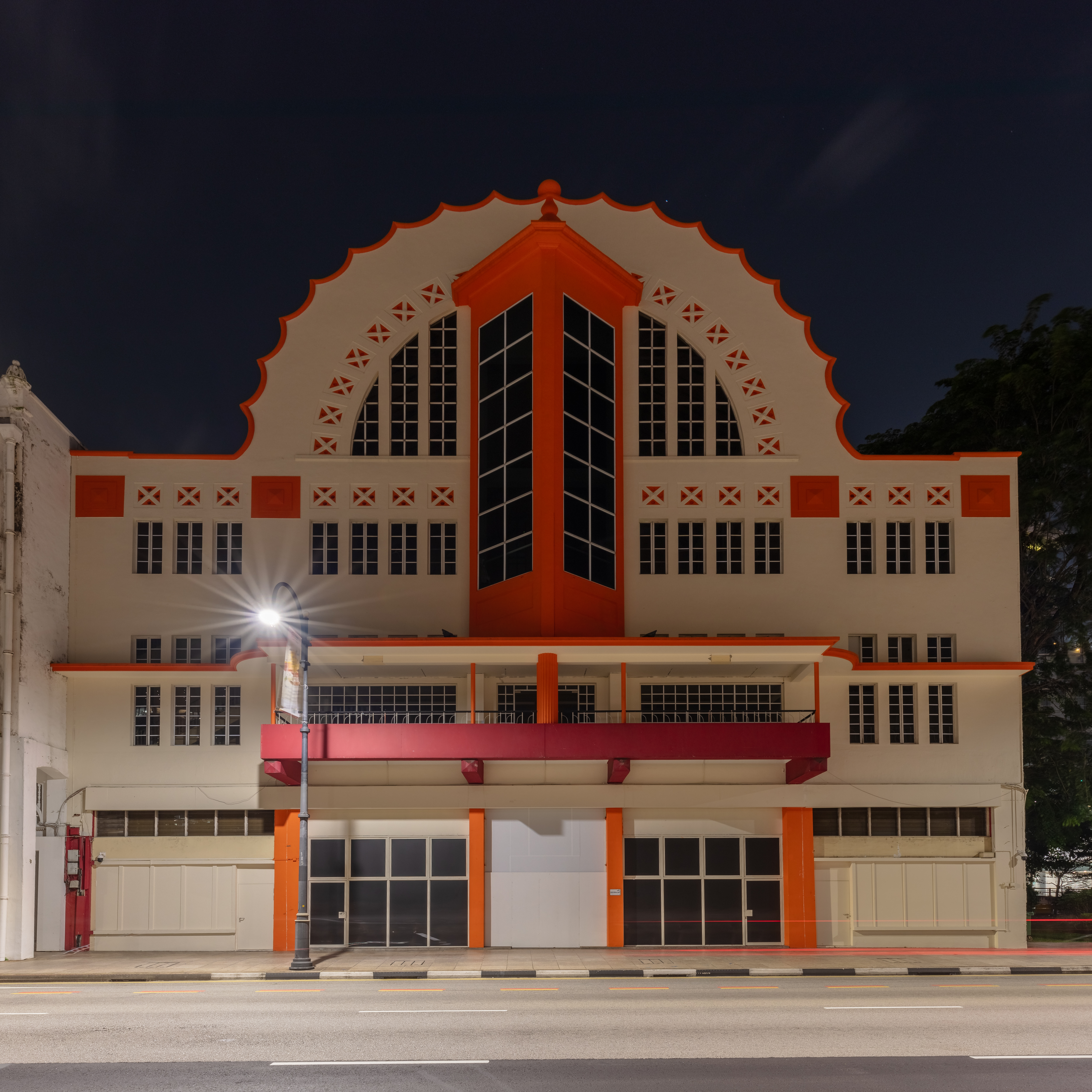
Former Malayan Motors Showroom in 2023

== History ==
The building was built by Wearne Brothers as a Malayan Motors showroom in 1925. It served as a car showroom until 1980. In 1986, Goldman Sachs held a party in the building.

In 1987, the Singapore Manufacturers' Association moved into the building, which was renamed the SMA House. The association renovated the building for $450,000 and introduced a library, offices, a conference room, and a showroom which showcased made-in-Singapore products. It was officially reopened on 9 March 1988. However, by May, the building had lost two-thirds of its exhibitors due to the high rental price for the display of products. In 2000, the building was gazetted for conservation. The Management Development Institute of Singapore moved into the building in 2002. The building has been included on the Orchard Heritage Trail by the National Heritage Board.
