= Sultan Ismail Building =

Meeting place for the Johor State Legislative Assembly

Sultan Ismail Building Bangunan Sultan Ismail باڠونن سلطان اسماعيل
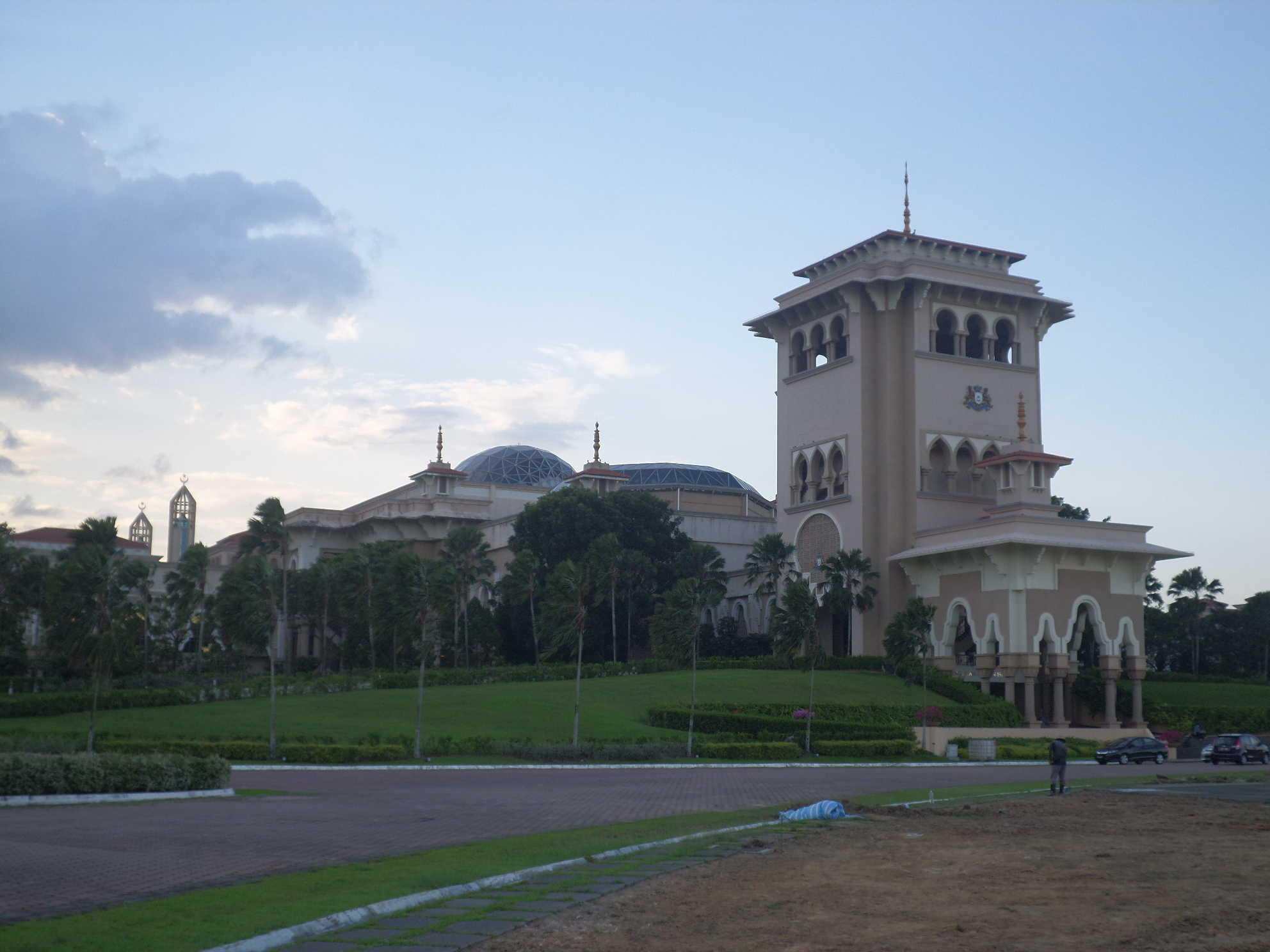
- Interactive map of the Sultan Ismail Building; Bangunan Sultan Ismail باڠونن سلطان اسماعيل area

General information
- Status: Completed
- Type: State legislative assembly building
- Location: Kota Iskandar, Iskandar Puteri, Johor, Malaysia
- Coordinates: 1°25′25″N 103°39′0″E
- Construction started: 2006
- Completed: 2008
- Opening: 2009
- Owner: Johor state government

Technical details
- Lifts/elevators: Unknown

Design and construction
- Developer: UEM Builders Berhad; Cahaya Jauhar Sdn Bhd

Sultan Ismail Building (Malay: Bangunan Sultan Ismail) is the meeting places for the Johor State Legislative Assembly. It is located in Kota Iskandar, Iskandar Puteri, Johor Bahru District, Johor, Malaysia. The architecture is a distinctive blend of Moorish-Andalusian and Johor-Malay design.

There are two distinctive skylights: one shaped like a diamond and another like a pineapple, a symbol of Johor's economic prosperity. The State Legastive Assembly Hall is Malaysia's first parliament that's open to the public. Integrated within the Hall are symbolisms of Johor's past and bright future, such as black pepper motifs. There are also many lush gardens, such as the Musk Lime Garden (Laman Kasturi) and Potpourri Garden (Laman Bunga Rampai). The Jauhar Atrium contains tropical plants and a waterfall. The building is named after The late Sultan Ismail Al-Khalidi ibni Al-Marhum Sultan Ibrahim Al-Masyhur.

Behind the building is Kota Iskandar Mosque, a Johor second state mosque.
