= Management Development Institute of Singapore =

Vocational university in Singapore

- Institut Pembangunan Pengurusan Singapura (Malay) 新加坡管理发展学院 (Chinese) சிங்கப்பூர் மேலாண்மை மேம்பாட்டு நிறுவனம் (Tamil)
- Motto: Where lifelong learning begins
- Type: Private
- Established: 1956
- Accreditation: Ministry of Education
- President: Eric Kuan Choon Hock
- Location: 501 Stirling Road, Singapore; 1.2970°N 103.7821°E
- Campus: Urban
- Website: Official website

The Management Development Institute of Singapore (MDIS) is a private vocational university for lifelong learning in Singapore. Founded in 1956, it offers a variety of degree programs such as business management, engineering, fashion design, nursing, mass communications, psychology and hospitality management.

It also offers preparatory courses for GCE 'O' level and 'A' level examinations for adults via its subsidiary MDIS College, which is registered under the Committee for Private Education Singapore (CPE).

== History ==
=== Before 1995 ===
1955: A group of personnel managers got together to discuss industrial relations problems. The coming-together sparked off the formation of the Supervisory and Management Training Association of Singapore (SAMTAS).

Understanding that supervisors were probably the best people to identify and solve any labour problems, training was catered primarily to these supervisors on aspects from job relations to industrial safety. Certified courses, seminars, lectures, film shows and excursions were organised. The inaugural meeting was held on 29 November 1955 where Mr Loke Wan Tho was named its first President. In April 1956, SAMTAS was formalised.

1963: SAMTAS pioneered the Training-Within-Industries (TWI) courses in Singapore. In line with the Singapore government's plans to promote industrialisation in the country, these were courses on supervisory skills initiated by the then Ministry of Labour.

1984: The plan to upgrade SAMTAS' status to that of a professional institute was initiated in 1982. The change of name from SAMTAS to MDIS, or the Management Development Institute of Singapore, was made official on 8 February 1984. The purpose of this move was to give a more professional image and to upgrade the individual membership by allowing the use of designatory letters.

SAMTAS, and then MDIS, is the oldest professional institute in Singapore today.

MDIS has collaborated with universities in the UK, the US and Australia to offer certified courses. Besides its certified courses from Certificate to Master's level, MDIS conducts seminars, in-house training and consultancy services and offers membership services and privileges.

=== 1995 to 2007 ===
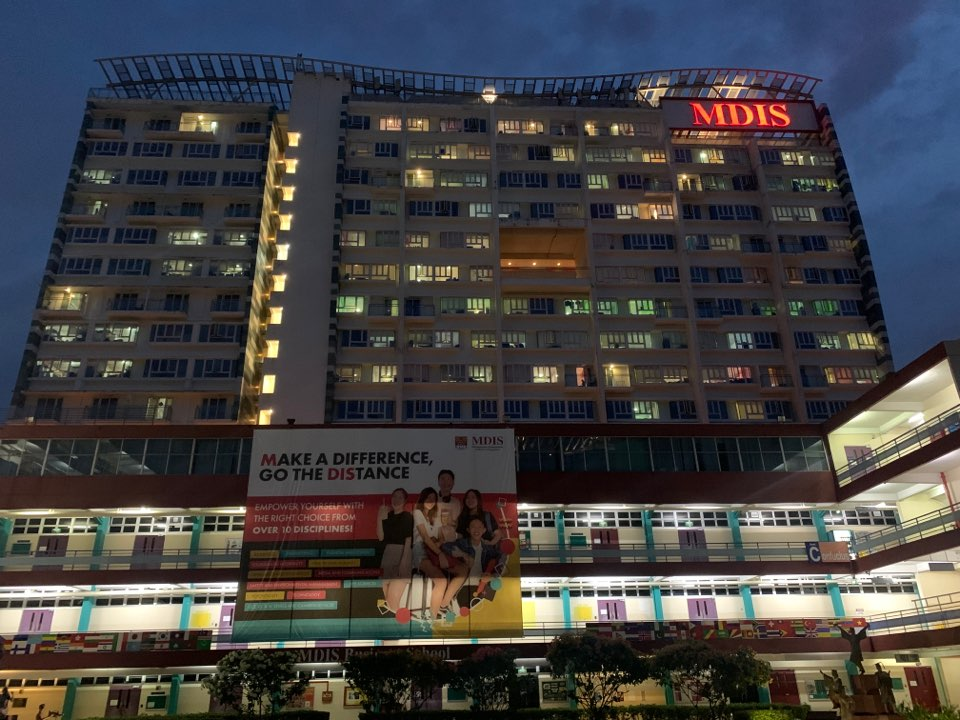
MDIS Campus

An International Affairs Department was set up in 1998 to handle the affairs of foreign students studying with MDIS. In March 2001, the Embassy of the People's Republic of China in Singapore announced that MDIS is a recognised educational institute in China. To date, MDIS has helped almost 3,000 foreign students attain academic qualifications through its courses.

MDIS was accorded charity status on 23 August 1996 under the Charities Registration Act, 1994. On 19 November 1997, MDIS was awarded the ISO 9001 certification. On 7 November 2000, MDIS received the People Developer Standard certification. The MDIS Education Trust Fund received its Institution of a Public Character and Charity status in 2002.

In 2002, MDIS expanded its campus and took over the SMA House on Orchard Road.

In 2003, MDIS was among the first seven education institutes to receive the Singapore Quality Class award for Private Education Organisations(PEOs).

Community projects that MDIS is involved in includes:

- Scholarships and bursaries to four self-help groups (Yayasan MENDAKI, CDAC, SINDA and The Eurasian Association), NTUC, SAFRA, CDANS and SPANS, and students from the secondary schools, junior colleges, ITEs and Polytechnics have been given out yearly since 1996. From the year 2001, together with the support from donors like university partners and other organisations, about a quarter of a million dollars were presented each year.
- In 1999, MDIS collaborated with the drama and dance faculty of the Oklahoma City University to present the American Spirit Dance Company's performance from 23 to 25 April, and the Charity Gala Dinner. A total of $272,000 was raised in aid of the Society for the Physically Disabled (SPD) and the MDIS Education Trust Fund.
- For education collaboration, MDIS has been expanded overseas campuses and provided comfortable living environment for exchange students.

=== 2008 to present ===
MDIS set up it first overseas campus Management Development Institute of Singapore in Tashkent in Tashkent, capital of Uzbekistan, built in 2008 at a cost of US$20 million. In 2014, it was announced a new building is to be built in Tashkent starting from the end of 2015 and expected to be completed by the end of 2016.

It was announced on 28 June 2010 that MDIS would be setting up an S$130 million overseas 30-acre (120,000 m^{2}) campus in Iskandar Malaysia which is expected to start work at the end of 2011 MDIS Malaysia is expected to be five times as big as the MDIS Campus in Singapore.

In 2015, MDIS planned to establish a campus in Chennai, India. In 2019, MDIS plans to open another campus in Turkmenistan.

In February 2025, it was announced that the Singapore campus would be shifting to 190 Changi Road in the first half of 2027.

== Graduate employment ==
MDIS, like other private universities in Singapore, is generally regarded as less prestigious by employers compared to the three main publicly-funded autonomous universities of the country: the National University of Singapore (NUS), Nanyang Technological University (NTU) and Singapore Management University (SMU). According to a survey conducted by the Committee for Private Education on employment outcomes, MDIS graduates recorded lower employment rates in contrast to public university graduates. However, it was higher than the full-time employment rates for post–National Service (NS) polytechnic graduates.

== Notable alumni ==
- Gibran Rakabuming Raka, former Vice President of Indonesia
- Bona Mugabe, daughter of former Zimbabwe president Robert Mugabe
- Shawn Thia, actor

== See also ==
- List of universities in Singapore
- EduTrust
