= Laws of the Constitution of Johor 1895 =

Constitution of Johor, Malaysia

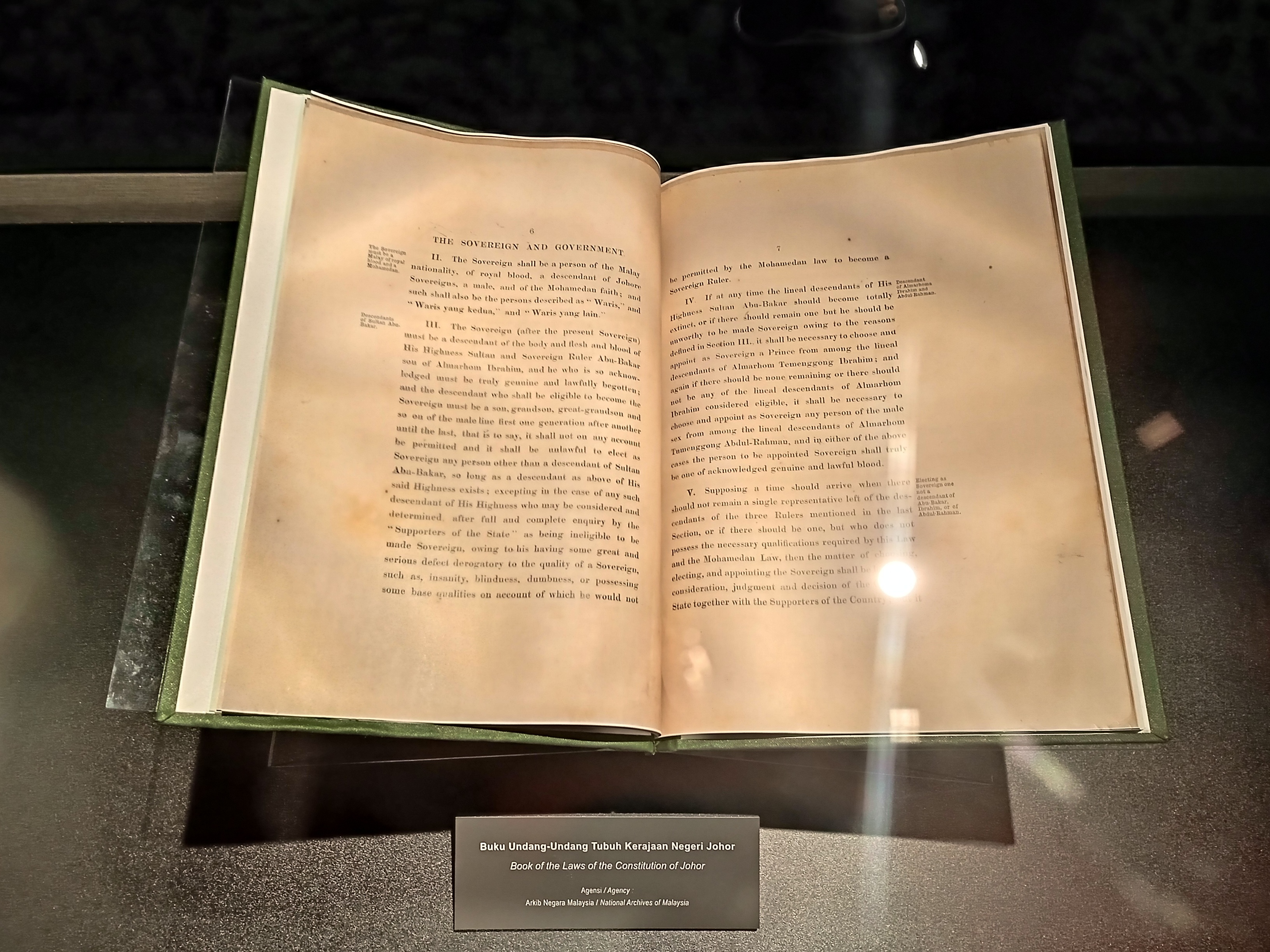
- Laws of the Constitution of Johor or Undang-undang Tubuh Negeri Johor

Overview
- Original title: Undang-Undang Tubuh Negeri Johor 1895
- Jurisdiction: Johor, Malaysia
- Subordinate to: Federal Constitution of Malaysia
- Ratified: 14 April 1895
- Date effective: 14 September 1895
- System: Parliamentary democracy Constitutional monarchy

Government structure
- Branches: Two (Legislative and Executive)
- Head of state: Sultan of Johor
- Chambers: Unicameral
- Executive: State Executive Council

History
- Amendments: 20
- Last amended: 1 April 2007
- Signatories: Ibrahim (Tunku Mahkota/Crown Prince); Dato’ Ungku Mohamed Khalid bin Dato' Temenggong Sri Maharaja Daeng Ibrahim; Dato’ Ungku Suleiman; Dato’ Jaafar Bin Haji Mohamed (Menteri Besar); Dato’ Syed Salim bin Ahmad Al-Attas (Mufti); Dato’ Haji Mohamed Salleh (Hakim); Dato’ Abdul Rahman bin Andak (Dato’ Sri Amar Diraja); Dato’ Mohamed Ibrahim Bin Abdullah Munshi (Dato’ Bentara Dalam); Dato’ Mohamed Salleh bin Perang (Dato’ Bentara Luar); Dato’ Jaafar bin Nong Yahya (Dato’ Penggawa Timur); Dato’ Abdul Samad bin Ibrahim (Dato’ Penggawa Barat); Dato’ Abdullah bin Tahir (Dato’ Sri Setia Raja); Dato’ Haji Abdul Rahman (Kadi); Dato’ Yahya bin Shaaban; Dato’ Andak; Dato’ Mohamed Mahbob; Dato’ Mohamed Yahya bin Awal-Ed-Deen

The Laws of the Constitution of Johor 1895 (Malay: Undang-undang Tubuh Negeri Johor 1895; Jawi: اوندڠ٢ توبوه نڬري جوهر) is the state constitution of Johor, promulgated on 14 September 1895 by Sultan Abu Bakar. The contents of the constitution covers:

- The procedures for the selection and coronation of the Sultan of Johor, as well as the succession procedures
- The laws and responsibilities of the State Assembly, Executive Council (Exco) and their members
- Rules regarding Islam as the official religion of Johor
- The development of the basics of legal punishments by justice courts
- International deals

Since 1895, the Johor State Constitution was revised 4 times:

- First Revision (1 April 1908)
- Second Revision (17 September 1912)
- Third Revision (12 May 1914)
- Fourth Revision (17 July 1918)

== Role in Malay nationalism ==
The Johor State Constitution was the first written constitution among the Malay states. The Johor State Constitution played a major role for the Malays during their opposition to the formation of the Malayan Union. The key factors of their protest was that all the sultans of Malay states would lose their power as the rulers of their respective states, and the way Sir Harold MacMichael threatened the sultans for their signatures.

Sultan Ibrahim of Johor was encouraged by MacMichael to sign on the treaty, sparking anger among Malays, claiming that signing the Malayan Union treaty violated the Johor State Constitution which disallowed the Sultan of Johor from performing actions that might threaten the sovereignty of Johor. As a response to the protest, he hosted the UMNO's first general assembly at his palace in Johor Bahru in May 1946. He also joined the boycott of the installation of the Malayan Union's first governor.

Due to the success of the Malayan Union protest, rulers of other Malay states began using Johor State Constitution as a model for their own constitutions in order to protect the sovereignty of Malay states.

== Composition ==
The Constitution of Johor in its current form since 1 January 2008, consists of three parts and 13 chapters, containing 107 articles and eight schedules (including 20 amendments since the Federation of Malaya's establishment in 1948).

=== Part I ===
- Chapter 1 - Interpretation

Chapter 1 contains only one article; article 1 that defines the terminologies used by the royal family members, heirs, persons conferred royal ranks, supporters of the country and council of the royal court.

- Chapter 2 - The Sovereign

Chapter 2 contains seven articles; article 2 to 8. This chapter pertains to the Sultan of Johor, including the qualifications of becoming the sultan, order of successions and heir apparent.

- Chapter 3 - Regency

Chapter 3 contains twenty-two articles; article 9 to 27 minus deleted articles 10, 11, 11A, 15 and 16. This chapter addresses the conditions that requires a regency and the process of appointing a regent, the appointment of a new ruler by the council of the Royal Court in event of the predecessor's abdication, the rights of an ex-ruler, the offices of raja muda, bendahara and temenggong, the allowances of the ruler and relatives and the princes that are concurrently officers of the state.

- Chapter 4 - Jumaah Pangkuan Negeri

Chapter 4 contains five articles; article 27A to 27E that pertain to roles and rights of Supporters of the Country, also known as the Jumaah Pangkuan Negeri.

- Chapter 5 - Jumaah Majlis Diraja

Chapter 5 contains twelve articles; article 28 to 44 minus deleted articles 29, 32 to 35 and 45 to 56. This chapter pertains to the roles and rights of Council of the Royal Court or Jumaah Majlis Diraja.

- Chapter 6 - Mischallaneous Memoranda

Chapter 6 contains seven articles; article 57 to 63 minus deleted articles 57A, 60 and 64. This chapter affirms Islam as the religion of the state, although "other religions are allowed to be practised in peace and harmony in all and every part of the Territories and Dependencies of the State of Johor". Other topics covered by this chapter include the representation of the sultan at the conference of rulers, laws and customs of the country, amity between states, motto of the royal family and the orders of the state.

=== Part II ===
- Chapter 1 - The Machinery of Government

Chapter 1 contains only one article; article 1 that defines the terminologies used by the government machinery and its organs and servants.

- Chapter 2 - Executive Authority

This chapter contains eleven articles; article 2 to 11. It pertains to executive authority power of the sultan, the process of appointment of Menteri Besar of Johor, state secretary, legal advisor, financial officer, and the members of Johor State Executive Council and rules regarding the proceedings of the council.

- Chapter 3 - The Power of Pardon

This chapter contains only one article; article 12 that addresses the power of Sultan to give pardon, reprieve or respite to convicted criminals that carries out crime in the state.

- Chapter 4 - Capacity of the State

This chapter contains one article; article 13. It addresses the capacity of the state to acquire, hold or dispose of property of any kind, to make contracts and to sue or be sued.

- Chapter 5 - The Legislature

This chapter contains twenty-three articles; article 14 to 35. It pertains to the Johor State Legislative Assembly, its memberships, summoning, prorogation and dissolution, speaker election, roles, and proceedings.

- Chapter 6 - Finance

This chapter contains six articles; article 36 to 41. It addresses financial issues and the budget.

=== Part III ===
- Chapter 1 - General Provisions

This chapter contains ten articles; article 1 to 10.

- Article 1 pertains to the special position of the Malays and the sultan's role of safeguarding it.
- Article 2 describes the impartial treatment of state employees regardless of race.
- Article 3 describes the state seal use by the state ruler.
- Article 4 describes the state mottos, emblems and flags.
- Article 5 pertains to the amendments of the constitution.
- Article 6 describes the application of clause (2) of Article 160 of the federal constitution and the provisions of Interpretation and General Clauses Ordinance 1948 to the state constitution.
- Article 7 pertains to the interpretation of the constitution.
- Article 8 - Prerogatives of Ruler Reserved, provides that the Constitution shall not affect the prerogatives, powers and jurisdiction of the Sultan.
- Article 9 describes the temporary provision as to composition of State Executive Council.
- Article 10 pertains to the copies and translations of the constitution in English.

=== Schedules ===
- First Schedule - The Oath for a Ruler
- Second Schedule - The Oath for a Regent
- Third Schedule - The Oath for a Counsellor of Regency
- Fourth Schedule - The Oath for a Counsellor of the Royal Court
- Fifth Schedule - Oath of Member of the State Executive Council
- Sixth Schedule - Oath of Member of the Legislative Assembly
- Seventh Schedule - Oath of Secrecy
- Eighth Schedule - Privileges and Powers of the Legislative Assembly
