= Kota Iskandar =

Coordinates: 1°25′21.7″N 103°39′06.3″E

- Administrative centre
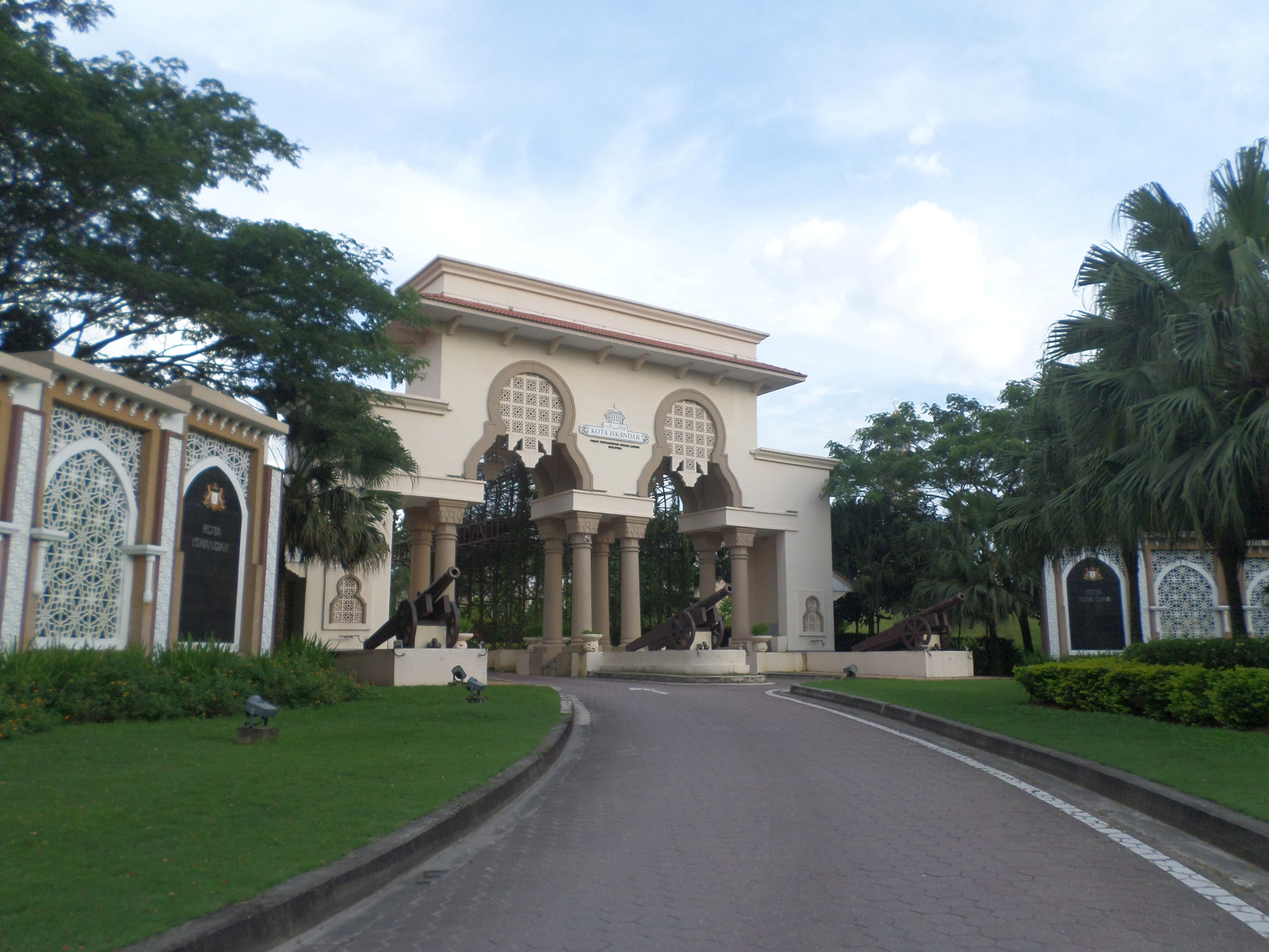
- Entrance to Kota Iskandar, exiting Lebuh Kota Iskandar into Persiaran Dewan Negeri.
- Interactive map of Kota Iskandar
- Country: Malaysia
- State: Johor
- District: Johor Bahru
- City: Iskandar Puteri
- Developer: Cahaya Jauhar
- Official launch: 19 April 2009

Area
  - Total: 1.3 km^{2} (0.50 sq mi)
- Time zone: MST
- Website: www.kotaiskandar.com

Kota Iskandar (Jawi: كوتا إسكندر) (formerly Johor State New Administrative Centre (JSNAC)) is the administrative complex of the state of Johor, Malaysia and its seat of government (Executive branch and Legislative branch of the Johor state government). It is located in Iskandar Puteri, Johor Bahru District and it is the first phase of the Iskandar Puteri project. The Iskandar Puteri project itself is a part of Iskandar Malaysia. Kota Iskandar was developed by Cahaya Jauhar and the first phase was completed in 2008.

== Name ==
Kota Iskandar was named after the late Sultan of Johor, Almarhum Sultan Iskandar.

== History ==
On 24 February 2004, the Johor State Government approved to build a new state administrative centre in Nusajaya, and the seat of government will also migrate to Nusajaya with allocation of 129.5 ha (320 arces) of waterfront site in the 9,700 ha (24,000 arces) Nusajaya site. Originally, the first choice to build the new administrative centre is in Johor Lama, and will named it as "Johor Perdana". But due to 1997 Asian Economic Crisis, the initial concept plan was cancelled and the state government suffered a setback and many companies collapsed at that time. In 2000, Renong (UEM Land) approached to the state government to allocate a site for free in Nusajaya to build the new administrative centre and develop the place jointly with state government. UEM Land also offered to buy the government 20% stake in Prolink Development Sdn Bhd (currently known as Bandar Nusajaya Development Sdn Bhd) that formed to develop Nusajaya, the share purchase would provide the government with the funds to build the place.

Kota Iskandar was officially launched by Sultan Iskandar on 19 April 2009. Within the same month, 2,200 civil servants moved to the new complex and the first sitting for Johor legislative assembly happened on 19 June 2009. In February 2010, public transportation was introduced to the area.

== Architecture ==
The administrative centre consists of the State Assembly Building, Chief Minister's and State Secretariat's Office (Dato' Jaafar Muhammad Building). The buildings are based on a Johor-Malay and Moorish architecture. The Chief Minister's and State Secretary Office houses the chief minister's office, state EXCO offices, Secretary of State office and many other departments. It has 21,480 square feet (1,996 m^{2}) of office space in a five-storey structure.

== Component ==
- Kota Iskandar Mosque
- Sultan Ismail Building (Johor State Legislative Assembly)
- Dataran Mahkota
- Dato' Jaafar Muhammad Building (Chief Minister's and State Secretariat's Office)
- Dato' Muhamad Salleh Perang Building (State Department Office)
- Bangunan Dato' Muhamad Ibrahim Munsyi (State Department Office)
- Bangunan Dato' Abdul Rahman Andak (State Department Office)

== Recognition & Awards ==
- 2012 Malaysia Landscape Architecture Award 2012 - Merit Award, Cluster C2S Complex Kota Iskandar
- 2012 Johor Tourism Awards - Anugerah Khas
- 2012 Johor Tourism Awards - Best Tourism Website
- 2012 Singapore Design Awards - Destination Branding - Silver
- 2011 Malaysia Landscape Architecture Award - Excellent Landscape Planning and Development Honour Award
- 2011 FIABCI Prix d'Excellence Award - Public Infrastructure / Amenities Runner-Up Paphos, Cyprus
- 2010 FIABCI Malaysia Property Award - Public Sector Winner
- 2009 A Johor State Tourism Top 10 Attraction
- 2007 Malaysian Institute of Planners (MIP) Planning Excellence Award - Planning Innovation Winner

== Roads ==
- Lebuh Kota Iskandar
- Persiaran Dato' Bentara Luar
- Persiaran Dewan Negeri
- Persiaran Tun Sri Lanang
- Persiaran Dato' Menteri
- Persiaran Dato' Sri Amar Diraja
- Persiaran Laksamana
- Lebuh Bahtera

== See also ==
- Iskandar Puteri
- Cahaya Jauhar
- UEM Land
- List of Menteris Besar of Johor
