= UEM Group =

Investment holding company in Malaysia

UEM Group Berhad (UEM Group)
- Type: Holding company
- Industry: •Expressways & Airports •Township & Property Development •Engineering & Construction •Assets & Facilities Management •Green Industries
- Founded: 1966
- Headquarters: Mercu UEM, KL Sentral, Kuala Lumpur, Malaysia
- Key people: Datuk Amran Hafiz Affifudin, Managing Director.
- Website: www.uem.com.my

UEM Group Berhad (UEM Group) is an infrastructure-focused, investment holding company and a wholly owned subsidiary of Khazanah Nasional Berhad.

Its core businesses are Expressways (PLUS Malaysia Berhad) & Airports (Malaysia Airports Holdings Berhad), Township & Property Development (UEM Sunrise Berhad), Engineering & Construction (Cement Industries of Malaysia Berhad or CIMA), Asset & Facility Management (UEM Edgenta Berhad), and Green Industries (UEM Lestra Berhad).

As at end of December 2024, UEM Group reported total assets of more than USD6.1 billion (RM27.1 billion), with shareholders' funds of approximately USD2.4 billion (RM10.7 billion).It has completed infrastructure projects spanning transportation, buildings, real estate and renewable energy facilities in Malaysia totalling more than USD13.6 billion since 1988 .

== History ==
The company was incorporated in 1966 as United Engineers (M) Bhd.

In 2001, it became a wholly owned subsidiary of Khazanah Nasional Berhad, the sovereign wealth fund of Malaysia.

== UEM Group of companies ==
Company logo	Name
	PLUS Malaysia Berhad
	Malaysia Airports Holdings Berhad
	UEM Sunrise Berhad
	CIMA Berhad
	UEM Edgenta Berhad
	UEM Lestra Berhad

== Mercu UEM ==
Mercu UEM
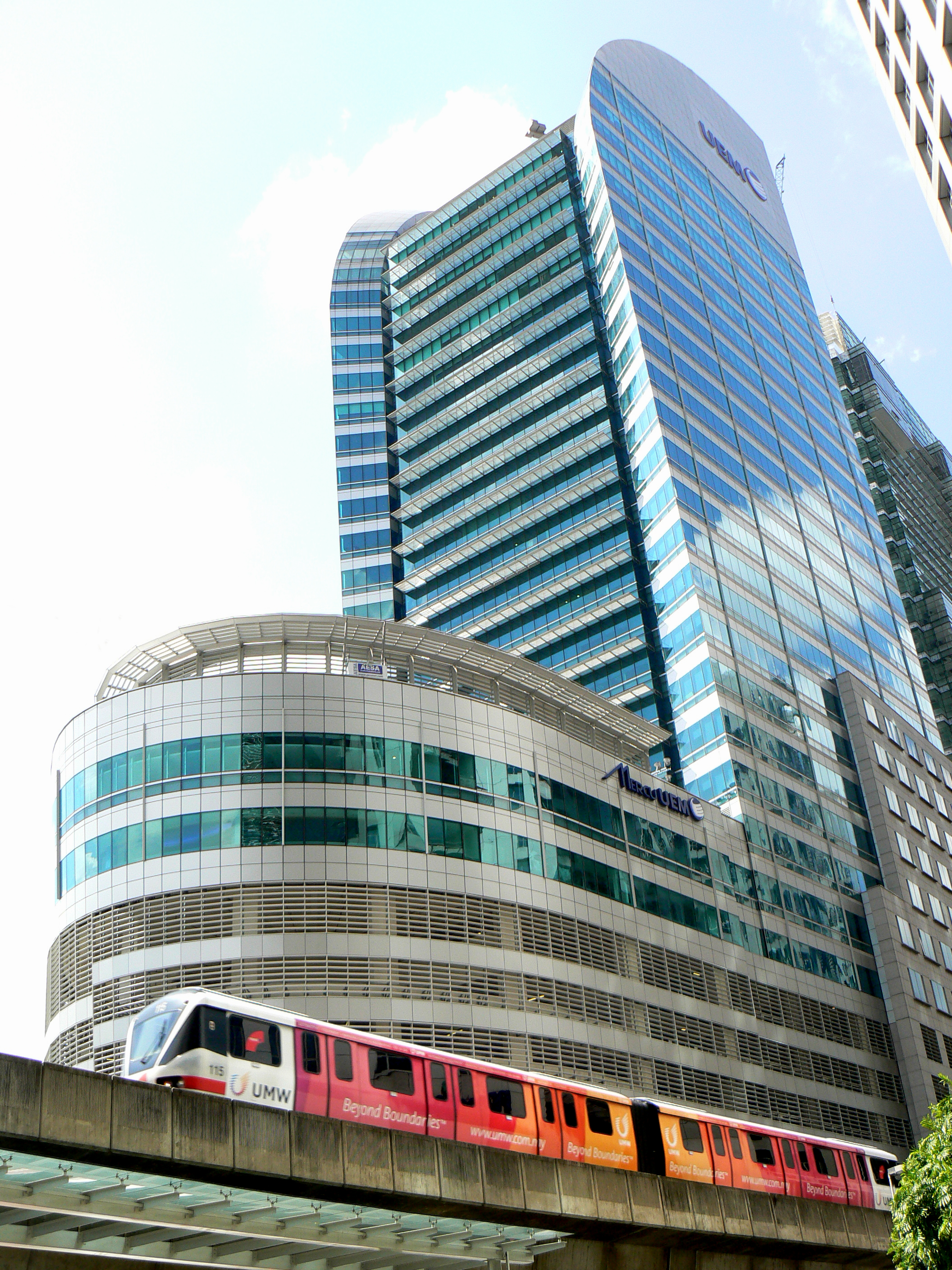

General information
- Type: Office and Headquarters
- Location: KL Sentral, Kuala Lumpur, Malaysia
- Construction started: 2006
- Completed: 2009
- Opening: 2010

Technical details
- Floor count: 29

Design and construction
- Architect: UEM Builders

Mercu UEM, a 29-storey commercial office building is the main headquarters of the UEM Group. It is located at KL Sentral, Kuala Lumpur.
