= List of companies of Malaysia =

Location of Malaysia

Malaysia is a federal constitutional monarchy located in Southeast Asia. It is a relatively state-oriented and newly industrialised market economy.

The state plays a significant but declining role in guiding economic activity through macroeconomic plans. In 2014, Malaysia's economy grew 5.1%, the third highest growth in ASEAN behind Philippines' growth of 5.6% and Vietnam’s growth of 6.6%. The economy of Malaysia (GDP PPP) in 2024 was $1.38 trillion, the fourth largest in ASEAN behind Indonesia, Thailand, Vietnam and the Philippines, while being the 30th largest in the world.

For further information on the types of business entities in this country and their abbreviations, see "Business entities in Malaysia".

== Largest firms ==
This list shows firms in the Fortune Global 500, which ranks firms by total revenues reported before 31 March 2017. Only the top five firms (if available) are included as a sample.

Rank	Image	Name	2016 Revenues (US$M)	Employees	Notes
184		Petronas	49,479	51,034	State-owned multinational oil and gas company vested with the entire oil and gas resources of Malaysia and operating in 35 countries. The firm has ranked as high as 68th globally in 2015.

== Notable firms ==
This list includes notable companies with primary headquarters located in the country. The industry and sector follow the Industry Classification Benchmark taxonomy. Organizations which have ceased operations are included and noted as defunct.

Notable companies Status: P=Private, S=State; A=Active, D=Defunct
Name	Industry	Sector	Headquarters	Founded	Notes	Status	
Adventa	Health care	Medical supplies	Petaling Jaya	2004	Health care supplies and support	P	A
AirAsia	Consumer Services	Airlines	Sepang	1993	Low cost airline	P	A
AmBank	Financials	Banks	Kuala Lumpur	1975	Retail and wholesale banking	P	A
Astro Malaysia Holdings	Consumer services	Broadcasting & entertainment	Kuala Lumpur	1996	Entertainment holding company	P	A
Astro Radio	Consumer services	Broadcasting & entertainment	Kuala Lumpur	1997	Radio network	P	A
Axiata	Telecommunications	Mobile telecommunications	Kuala Lumpur	1992	Mobile network	P	A
Berjaya Group	Consumer Services	Hotels	Kuala Lumpur	1984	Resorts, gambling	P	A
Bonia	Consumer Services	Apparel retailers	Kuala Lumpur	1974	Clothing and fashion retailer	P	A
Boustead Holdings	Conglomerates	-	Kuala Lumpur	1828	Plantations, heavy industries, property, finance, trading	P	A
BSA Manufacturing	Consumer Goods	Tires	Rawang	1995	Automotive, tires	P	A
Bufori	Consumer Goods	Automobiles	Kuala Lumpur	1986	Hand-made automotive	P	A
Bumiputra-Commerce Holdings	Financials	Banks	Kuala Lumpur	1987	Bank and financial services	P	A
Bursa Malaysia	Financials	Investment services	Kuala Lumpur	1964	Exchange, previously Kuala Lumpur Stock Exchange, KLSE	P	A
Capital Dynamics	Financials	Asset managers	Kuala Lumpur	1989	Investment firm	P	A
CIMB	Financials	Banks	Kuala Lumpur	1924	Bank	P	A
Destini Berhad	Conglomerate	-	Shah Alam	1991	Heavy Industry, Oil and Gas	P	A
Digi Telecommunications	Telecommunications	Mobile telecommunications	Shah Alam	1995	Mobile network	P	A
DRB-HICOM	Consumer Goods	Automobiles	Shah Alam	1996	Autos	P	A
Dutch Lady Milk Industries	Consumer goods	Food products	Selangor	1963	Dairy products, part of FrieslandCampina (Netherlands)	P	A
Edaran Otomobil Nasional (EON)	Consumer Goods	Automobiles	Shah Alam	1984	Distributes Proton cars	P	A
Friendster	Technology	Internet	Kuala Lumpur	2002	Social gaming website, defunct 2015	P	D
Gamuda	Industrials	Heavy construction	Petaling Jaya	1976	Construction	P	A
Genting Group	Consumer Services	Hotels	Kuala Lumpur	1965	Tourism, resorts, gaming	P	A
Giant Hypermarket	Consumer Goods	Retail	Shah Alam	1944	Hypermarket and retailer chain	P	A
Golden Hope	Consumer Goods	Food products	Kuala Lumpur	1905	Plantations	P	A
Golden Screen Cinemas	Consumer Services	Recreational services	Petaling Jaya	1987	Cinema chain	P	A
Guthrie	Consumer Goods	Food products	Kuala Lumpur	1821	Plantations, defunct 2007	P	D
HELP International Corporation	Education	Business training & employment agencies	Kuala Lumpur	2005	Private training and education	P	A
Hong Leong Bank	Financials	Banks	Kuala Lumpur	1905	A major public listed banking group in Malaysia	P	A
IHH Healthcare	Healthcare	Healthcare services	Kuala Lumpur	1974	-	P	A
iMoney.my	Financials	Consumer finance	Kuala Lumpur	2012	Financial comparisons	P	A
IOI Group	Conglomerates	-	Putrajaya	1969	Agriculture, chemicals, consumer marketing, property development, investment, resorts	P	A
Iskandar Investment Berhad	Financials	Real estate holding & development	Iskandar Puteri	2006	Developer	P	A
The Italian Baker	Consumer Goods	Food products	Sungai Buloh	2011	Bread bakery	P	A
Jaring	Technology	Internet	Kuala Lumpur	1992	Internet service provider, defunct 2015	P	D
Jirnexu	Financials	Consumer finance	Kuala Lumpur	2012	Financial comparisons	P	A
JobStreet.com	Industrials	Business training & employment agencies	Kuala Lumpur	1997	Employment site	P	A
Johor Corporation	Financials	Real estate holding & development	Johor Bahru	1968	State-owned, economic development	S	A
Khazanah Nasional	Financials	Real estate holding & development	Kuala Lumpur	1993	Government holding company	S	A
Khind Holdings Berhad	Consumer goods	Durable household products	Shah Alam	1961	Electrical appliances company	P	A
KK Super Mart	Consumer goods	Retail	Kuala Lumpur	2001	Retailer chain	P	A
Keretapi Tanah Melayu (KTM)	Industrials	Railroads	Kuala Lumpur	1885	Railways, state-owned	S	A
Kossan Rubber Industries	Consumer Goods	Manufacturing	Kuala Lumpur	1979	Rubber	P	A
Kulim (Malaysia) Berhad	Consumer Goods	Food products	Johor Bahru	1933	Food	P	A
Lam Eng Rubber	Basic materials	Commodity chemicals	Sungai Petani	1940	Rubber	P	A
Lion Group	Conglomerates	-	Kuala Lumpur	1930	Trading, automotive, steel	P	A
Magnum Corporation	Consumer Services	Gambling	Kuala Lumpur	1968	Gaming	P	A
Maybank	Financials	Banks	Kuala Lumpur	1960	Bank	P	A
Malaysia Airlines	Consumer Services	Airlines	Sepang	1937	National air carrier	S	A
Malaysia Airports	Industrials	Transportation services	Sepang	1991	State-owned, manages most airports	S	A
Marrybrown	Consumer Services	Restaurants & bars	Johor Bahru	1981	Restaurant chain	P	A
Maxis Communications	Telecommunications	Fixed line telecommunications	Kuala Lumpur	1993	Telecom	P	A
MBO Cinemas	Consumer Services	Recreational services	Klang	2003	Cinema chain	P	A
Media Prima Berhad	Consumer Services	Broadcasting & entertainment	Kuala Lumpur & Petaling Jaya	2003	Media	P	A
MIMOS	Technology	Technology hardware	Kuala Lumpur	1984	Research and development	S	A
MISC Berhad	Industrials	Marine transportation	Kuala Lumpur	1968	Shipping company	P	A
Modenas	Consumer goods	Automobiles	Gurun	1995	National motorcycle manufacturer	S	A
MR.DIY	Consumer goods	Hardware	Kuala Lumpur	2004	-	P	A
MUI Group	Conglomerates	-	Kuala Lumpur	1960	Retail, financial services, hotels, food	P	A
Munchy's	Consumer goods	Food products	Batu Pahat	1991	Snacks, part of Universal Robina (Philippines)	P	A
Mydin	Consumer services	Food retailers & wholesalers	Subang Jaya	1940	Hypermarket	P	A
NAZA Group	Consumer goods	Automobiles	Kuala Lumpur	1975	Autos	P	A
New Straits Times Press	Consumer services	Publishing	Kuala Lumpur	1845	Newspapers	P	A
Nibong Tebal Paper Mill	Consumer goods	Nondurable products	Seberang Perai	1975	Paper towel	P	A
OYL Industries	Consumer goods	Durable household products	Kuala Lumpur	1974	Air-conditioning, defunct 2006	P	D
Parkson	Consumer services	Broadline retailers	Kuala Lumpur	1987	Department stores	P	A
Pensonic	Consumer goods	Durable household products	George Town	1965	Electrical appliances	P	A
Permodalan Nasional Berhad	Financials	Asset management	Kuala Lumpur	1978	Fund management	P	A
Perodua	Consumer goods	Automobiles	Serendah	1993	Autos	P	A
Petronas	Oil & gas	Exploration & production	Kuala Lumpur	1974	State oil and gas	S	A
PLUS	Industrials	Heavy construction	Petaling Jaya	1986	Expressways	P	A
Pos Malaysia	Industrials	Delivery Services	Kuala Lumpur	1800	Government-linked company	P	A
PPB Group	Conglomerates	-	Kuala Lumpur	1968	Food, Agriculture, Waste Management, Cinema, Property	P	A
Prasarana Malaysia	Consumer services	Travel & tourism	Kuala Lumpur	1998	Public transportation, state controlled	S	A
Proton Holdings	Consumer goods	Automobiles	Shah Alam	1983	Autos, owned by DRB-HICOM	P	A
Public Bank Berhad	Financials	Bank	Kuala Lumpur	1966	Bank	P	A
Ramly Group	Consumer services	Restaurants & bars	Kuala Lumpur	1984	Frozen and fast food	P	A
Ranhill Holdings Berhad	Utilities	Conventional electricity	Kuala Lumpur	1981	Power utility	P	A
Resort World	Consumer services	Hotels	Kuala Lumpur	1980	Entertainment	P	A
RHB Bank	Financials	Banks	Kuala Lumpur	1997	Bank	P	A
Rotiboy	Consumer Service	Restaurants & bars	Rawang	1998	Restaurant chain	P	A
Royal Selangor	Consumer Goods	Durable household products	Kuala Lumpur	1885	Pewter goods	P	A
Scientex Incorporated Berhad	Basic materials	Specialty chemicals	Shah Alam	1968	Chemicals	P	A
Scomi	Oil & gas	Oil equipment & services	Kuala Lumpur	1990	Oil and gas	P	A
Sime Darby	Conglomerates	-	Kuala Lumpur	2007	Plantations, property, industrial, motors and energy & utilities.	P	A
SIRIM	Industrials	Business support services	Shah Alam	1996	Government industrial research	S	A
99 Speedmart	Consumer goods	Retail	Klang	1987	Retailer chain	P	A
Sunway Group	Conglomerate	Real estate holding & development	Subang Jaya	1974	Real estate development and holding	P	A
Supermax	Consumer goods	Personal products	Kuala Lumpur	1987	Glove manufacturer	P	A
Tan Chong Motor	Consumer goods	Automobiles	Kuala Lumpur	1972	Autos	P	A
Tanjong	Financials	Investment services	Kuala Lumpur	1926	Investment	P	A
Tenaga Nasional	Utilities	Conventional electricity	Kuala Lumpur	1990	Electric supplier	P	A
Telekom Malaysia (TM)	Telecommunications	Fixed line telecommunications	Kuala Lumpur	1984	Telecom	P	A
TGV Cinemas	Consumer services	Recreational services	Kuala Lumpur	1995	Cinema chain	P	A
Top Glove	Consumer goods	Personal products	Shah Alam	1991	Rubber gloves	P	A
UEM Group	Industrials	Heavy construction	Kuala Lumpur	1966	Construction	P	A
UMW Holdings	Conglomerates	-	Shah Alam	1917	Auto, oil & gas, manufacturing & engineering, equipment, owned by Sime Darby	P	A
VADS	Technology	Computer hardware	Kuala Lumpur	1991	IT company	P	A
ViTrox	Industrials	Electrical components & equipment	Bayan Lepas	2000	Electronics	P	A
Wah Seong Corporation	Oil & gas	Oil equipment & services	Kuala Lumpur	1994	Oil and gas	P	A
Yinson Holdings	Conglomerates	Marine; Energy; Technology	Kuala Lumpur	1955	Offshore production Renewable energy Green technologies	P	A
YTL Corporation	Industrials	Heavy construction	Kuala Lumpur	1955	Infrastructure	P	A

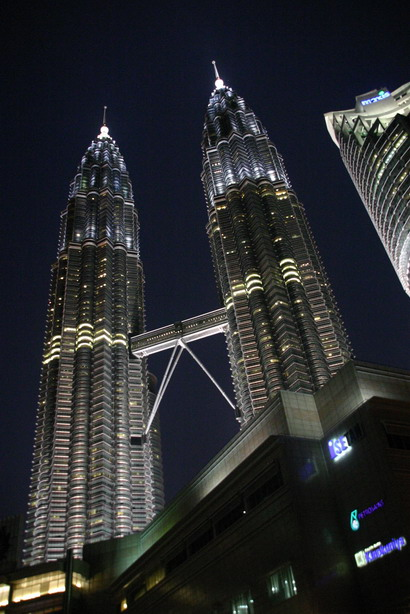
The Petronas Towers.

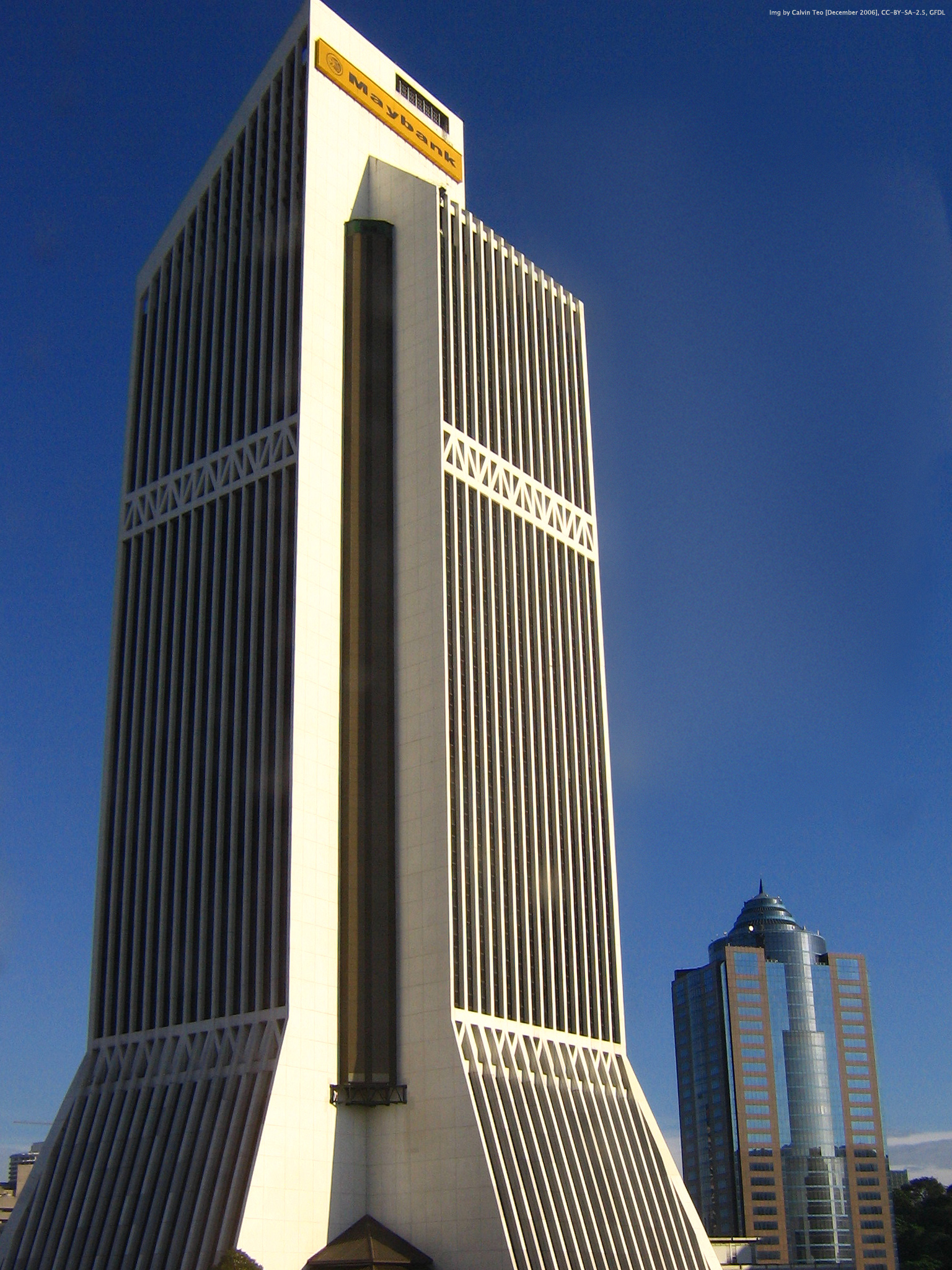
Menara Maybank, in Kuala Lumpur

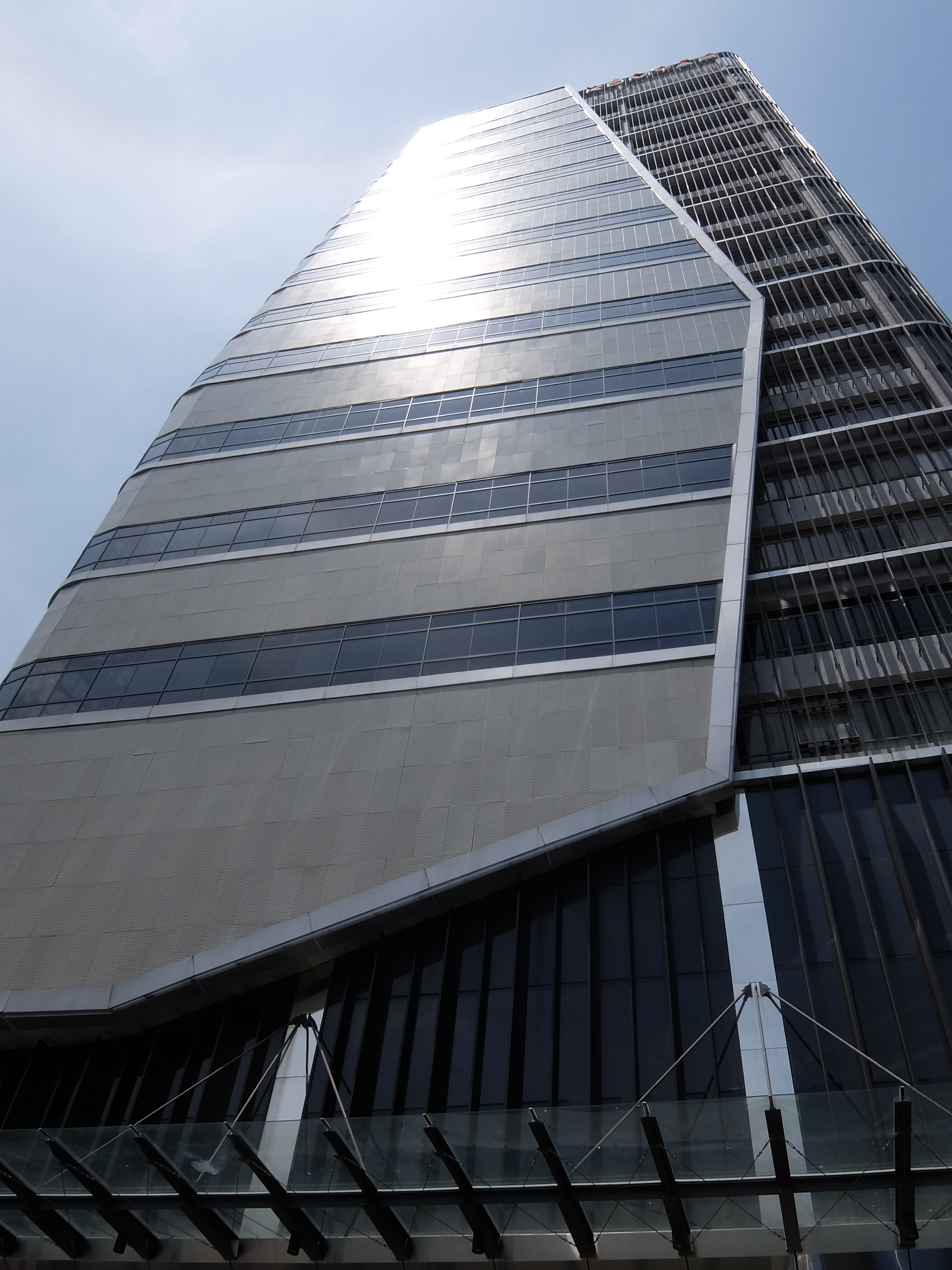
KOMTAR JBCC Tower which houses the Johor Corporation.

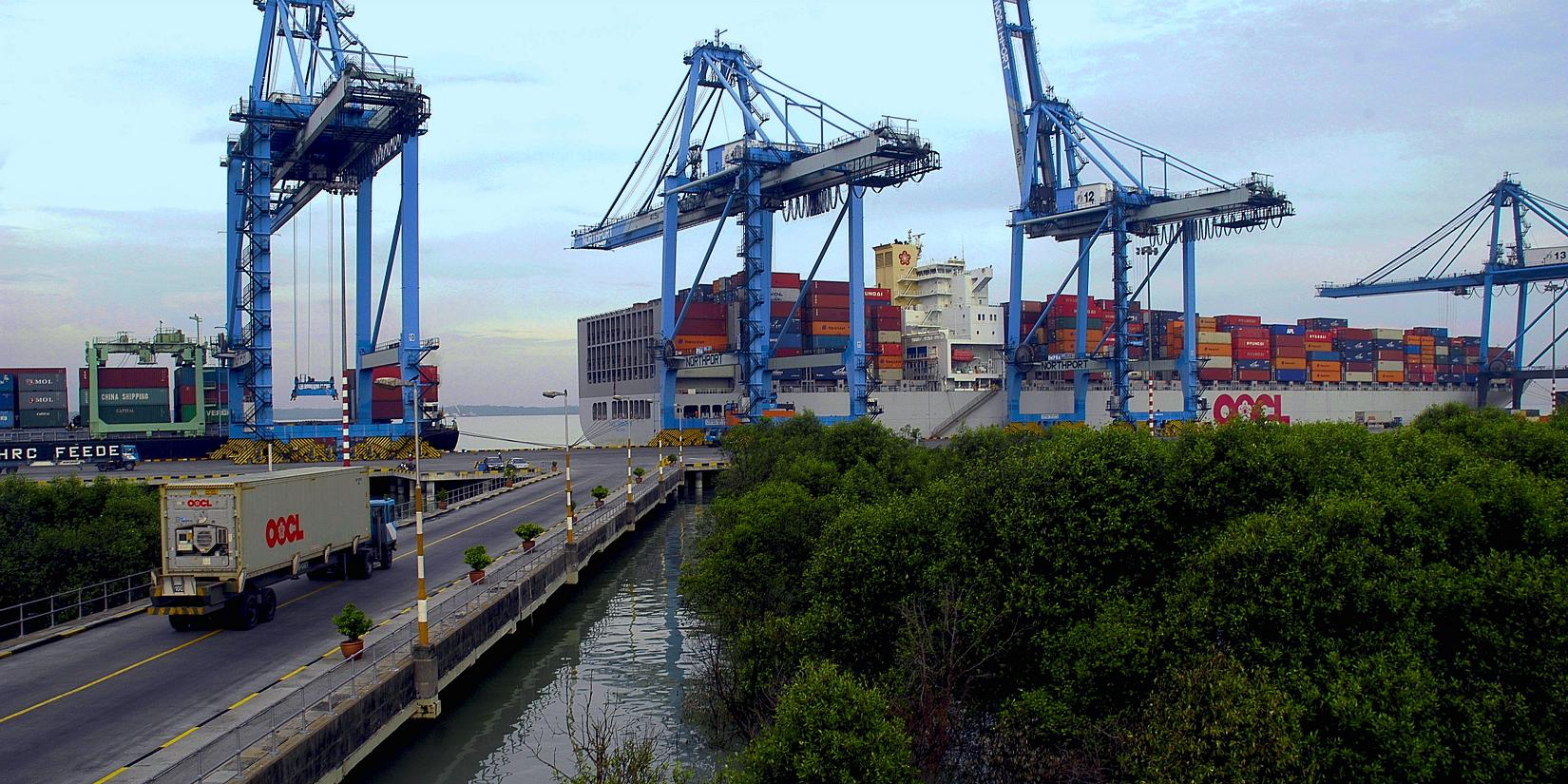
Port Klang in Selangor, the biggest and busiest port in Malaysia.

== See also ==
- Companies Commission of Malaysia
- Economy of Malaysia
- Kuala Lumpur Composite Index
