= Medini Iskandar Malaysia =

Coordinates: 1°25′30.6″N 103°38′00.9″E

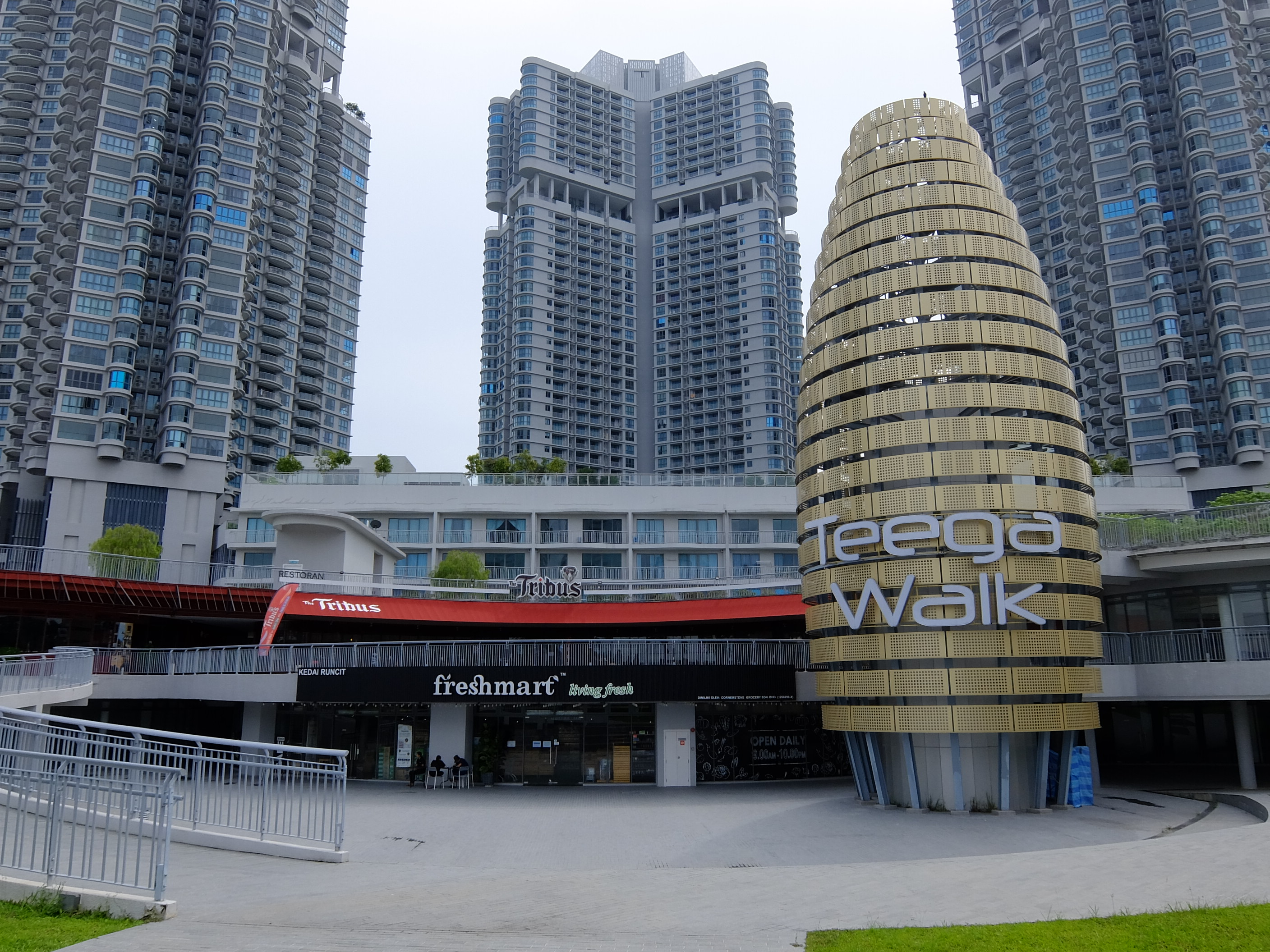
- Interactive map of Medini Iskandar Malaysia
- Country: Malaysia
- State: Johor
- District: Johor Bahru
- City: Iskandar Puteri

Medini Iskandar Malaysia (MIM) is a suburb in Iskandar Puteri, Johor Bahru District, Johor, Malaysia.

Medini is a 2,230 acres (9.0 km^{2}) urban township development. It'is planned for a population of 450,000 by 2030. Medini is Malaysia's largest single urban development to date and will become the Central Business District of Iskandar Puteri. The gross development value of Medini stands at US$20 billion, spanning 15 to 20 years to develop.

== Name ==
The name Medini is derived from the ancient name of the southern tip of Peninsular Malaysia, Ujong Medini.

== Shareholders ==
Established in 2007, MIM's original shareholders include: Iskandar Investment Berhad (‘IIB’) (75%) – majority owned by Khazanah Nasional Berhad (‘KNB’) – and United World Infrastructure (‘UWI’) (25%). The development was launched at CityScape Dubai, an annual property investment trade show for the real estate industry.

In 2008, IIB and UWI established two public-private partnerships with additional Middle Eastern partners to facilitate the development of Medini: Global Capital and Development Sdn Bhd. with Mubadala from Abu Dhabi and Medini Central Sdn Bhd with Kuwait Finance House (‘KFH’) from Kuwait.

In 2013, Mitsui & Co Ltd. acquired 20% of the shares in MIM to support the development of Medini's smart city infrastructure and services.

Today, shareholders of MIM include Jasmine Acres Sdn Bhd (60%), UWI (20%), and Mitsui & Co., Ltd (20%). Jasmine Acres is jointly owned by IIB and KNB.

== Medini Iskandar Malaysia Sdn Bhd ==
The company behind Medini's development is Medini Iskandar Malaysia Sdn Bhd ("MIM"), a public-private partnership between a group of Malaysian Government Linked Companies (GLCs) and private investors.

Since MIM's inception in 2007, the company has been responsible for each stage of the development value chain: from master planning and infrastructure development, to being a building developer and a township management service provider.

== Medini Masterplan ==
The Medini masterplan was designed upon UWI's economic cluster model. Economic clusters are mixed-use, urban developments with a 24-hour lifecycle. They offer convenient living, working, and leisure activities for residents, visitors, and workers. Each cluster is integrated within the surrounding economic network.

The masterplan is divided into 5 independently themed zones:

=== Zone A; Medini North ===
Zone A includes LEGOLAND® Malaysia Resort, Mall of Medini, Gleneagles Medini Hospital, and the Afiniti Medini: an urban wellness project including Somerset Medini Serviced Suites and CIMB Leadership Training Centre.

=== Zone B; Medini Business District ===
Zone B is a planned business and media district which includes office space, residential buildings, and community centers.

=== Zone C, D and E; Medini Central ===
Medini Central includes trade and logistics, creative parks, and a heritage district. Zone E, now known as Avira, is a 207-acre development for wellness initiatives with a dedicated wellness center.

=== Zone F; Medini South ===
Zone F features Sunway Iskandar. Sunway Iskandar, known as Nature's Capital City, is home to eco-parks, villas, boutique retail centers, as well as, a health and wellness village.

== Medini Regulatory Framework ==
Medini's regulatory framework was created through a collaboration between MIM and the Iskandar Regional Development Authority (IRDA) to attract investors and support national economic development. IRDA facilitates licensing and registration requirements for new businesses and investors. In addition, there are also fiscal and non-fiscal incentive packages specific to Medini.

== Smart City Initiatives ==
Medini's township management services are provided through partnerships between MIM and specialized service providers. In 2015, MIM signed two joint venture agreements with: a subsidiary company of Telekom Malaysia, to provide ICT services, and with UEM Sunrise Edgenta, to provide estate and building management services.

== Tourist attractions ==
- Legoland Malaysia Resort
- Mall of Medini

== Public transportation ==
There are buses shuttling to and from Medini. The main bus stop in this area is the Mall of Medini/ Legoland Malaysia Resort.

Bus No.	Destinations
CW7L	Hotel Ramada Medini ↔ Tuas Link MRT station (Singapore) via Mall of Medini/ Legoland Malaysia Resort
LM01	JB Sentral ↔ Terminal Gelang Patah via Mall of Medinin/ Legoland Malaysia Resort
IP01	Larkin Sentral (Medan Selera Johor) ↔ Puteri Harbour via Mall of Medini/ Legoland Malaysia Resort
IP02	Puteri Harbour ↔ AEON Bukit Indah Shopping Centre via Mall of Medini/ Legoland Malaysia Resort
IP03	Forest City (Johor) ↔ AEON Bukit Indah Shopping Centre via Mall of Medini
