= Legoland Malaysia Resort =

Theme park in Johor Bahru, Malaysia

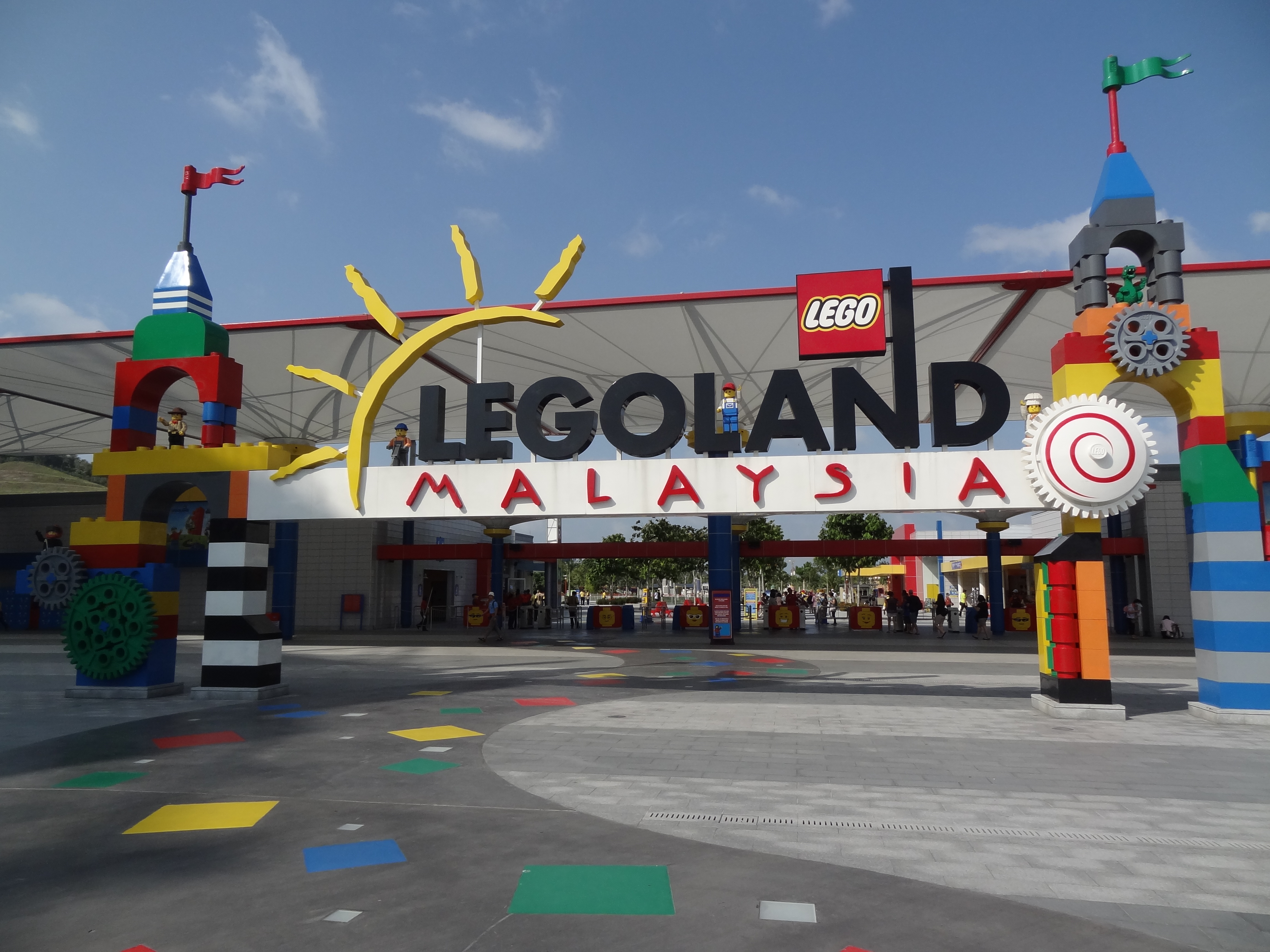
- Interactive map of Legoland Malaysia Resort
- Location: Iskandar Puteri, Johor, Malaysia
- Coordinates: 1°25′30″N 103°37′38″E
- Status: Operating
- Opened: 15 September 2012; 14 years ago
- Operated by: Merlin Entertainments
- Theme: LEGO
- Operating season: Year-round
- Area: 76 acres (310,000 m^{2})

Attractions
- Total: 20
- Roller coasters: 3
- Water rides: 2
- Website: www.legoland.com.my

Legoland Malaysia Resort is a theme park in Iskandar Puteri, Johor, Malaysia. It opened on September 15, 2012 with over 40 interactive rides, shows and attractions. It is the first Legoland theme park in Asia and sixth in the world upon its establishment. Legoland Malaysia was officially opened by Ibrahim Iskandar, Sultan of Johor on 22 September.

== History ==
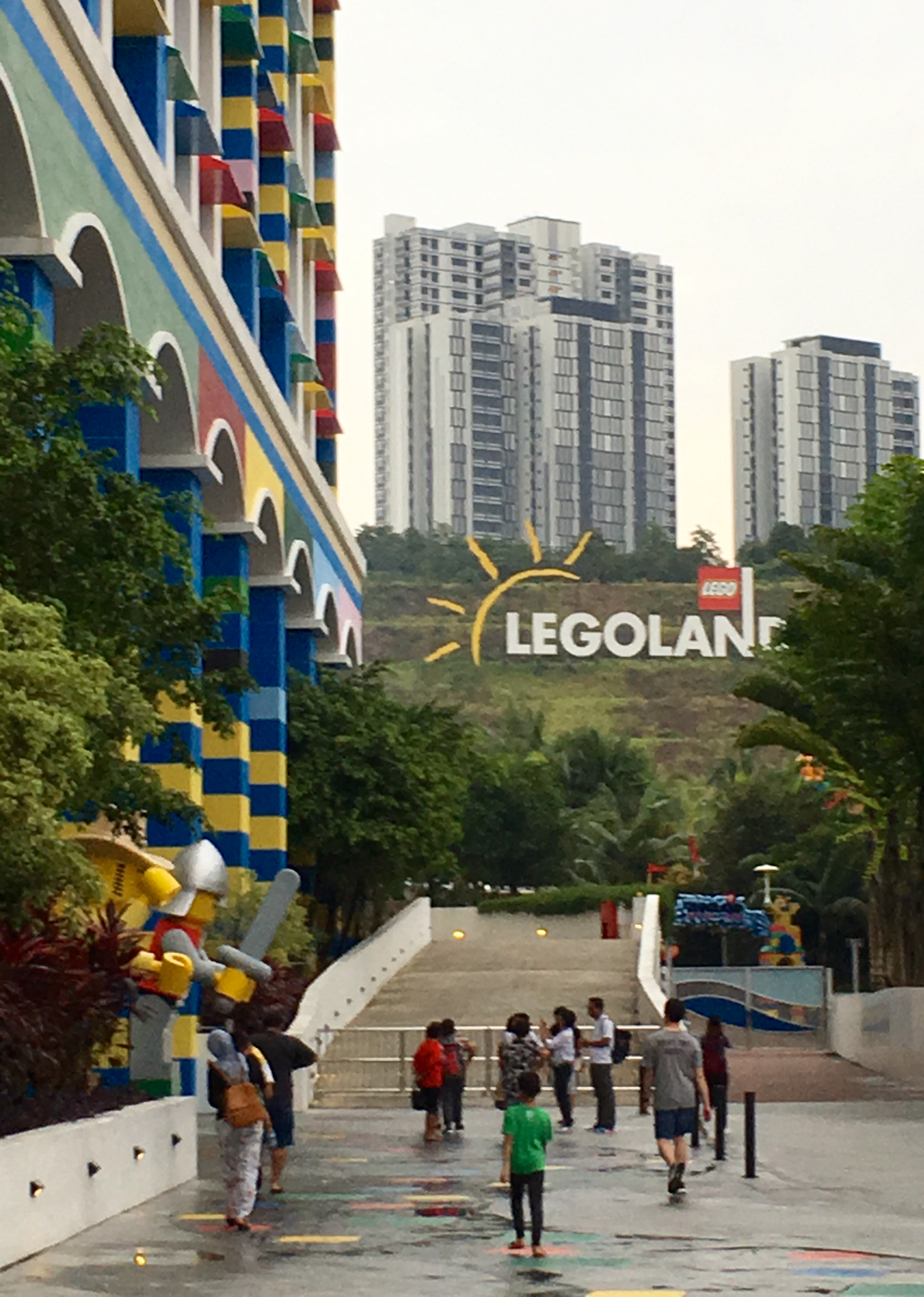
Signage of Legoland Malaysia, with Legoland Hotel on the left.

Groundbreaking for the theme park was held on 2 December 2009, hosted by site developer Iskandar Investment Berhad (IIB). Site operator Merlin Entertainments had signed an agreement with IIB to build Legoland Malaysia in December 2008. Merlin signed another agreement with LL Themed Hotel SdnBhd to develop and build the Legoland Hotel in April 2012.

Besides the Legoland Malaysia theme park, other resort attractions include Legoland Water Park (opened in 2013), which is a Lego-themed water theme park, and The Legoland Hotel (first half of 2014), a Lego-themed hotel, which is also the first to open in Southeast Asia. The hotel was built under a management agreement between the Company and LL Themed Hotel Sdn. Bhd., a joint-venture company owned by Destination Resorts and Hotels Sdn Bhd and Iskandar Harta Holdings Sdn Bhd.

The cost of Legoland Malaysia and the water theme park was RM720 million, while The Legoland Hotel cost RM190 million.

Early 2017, SEA LIFE Malaysia begin construction.

When Legoland Malaysia opened in 2012, it targeted 1.5 million visitors and expected to generate more than RM100 million in the first year of its operation. In September 2017, Legoland Malaysia Resort appointed global digital marketing agency VML to handle all aspects of digital marketing.

According to reports, In November 2017, Legoland Malaysia Resort launched the world's first Lego virtual reality roller coaster.

The Sea Life eventually open to public in April 2019.

== Layout ==
Themed areas and key locations within Legoland Malaysia Resort

Legoland Malaysia is divided into several major areas, each featuring attractions sharing a common theme. Starting from the entrance (themed The Beginning) on the park's eastern edge and proceeding clockwise, they are Technic, Kingdoms, Imagination, Land of Adventure, and City; in the centre of the park is MINILAND. NINJAGO World was added to Land of Adventure in 2016. The Water Park was opened on 21 October 2013, on the park's southeastern edge, as the largest LEGOLAND water park in the world and requires a separate admission fee; the SEA LIFE Malaysia aquarium was officially opened on 28 June 2019 near The Beginning and also requires a separate admission fee.

=== The Beginning ===
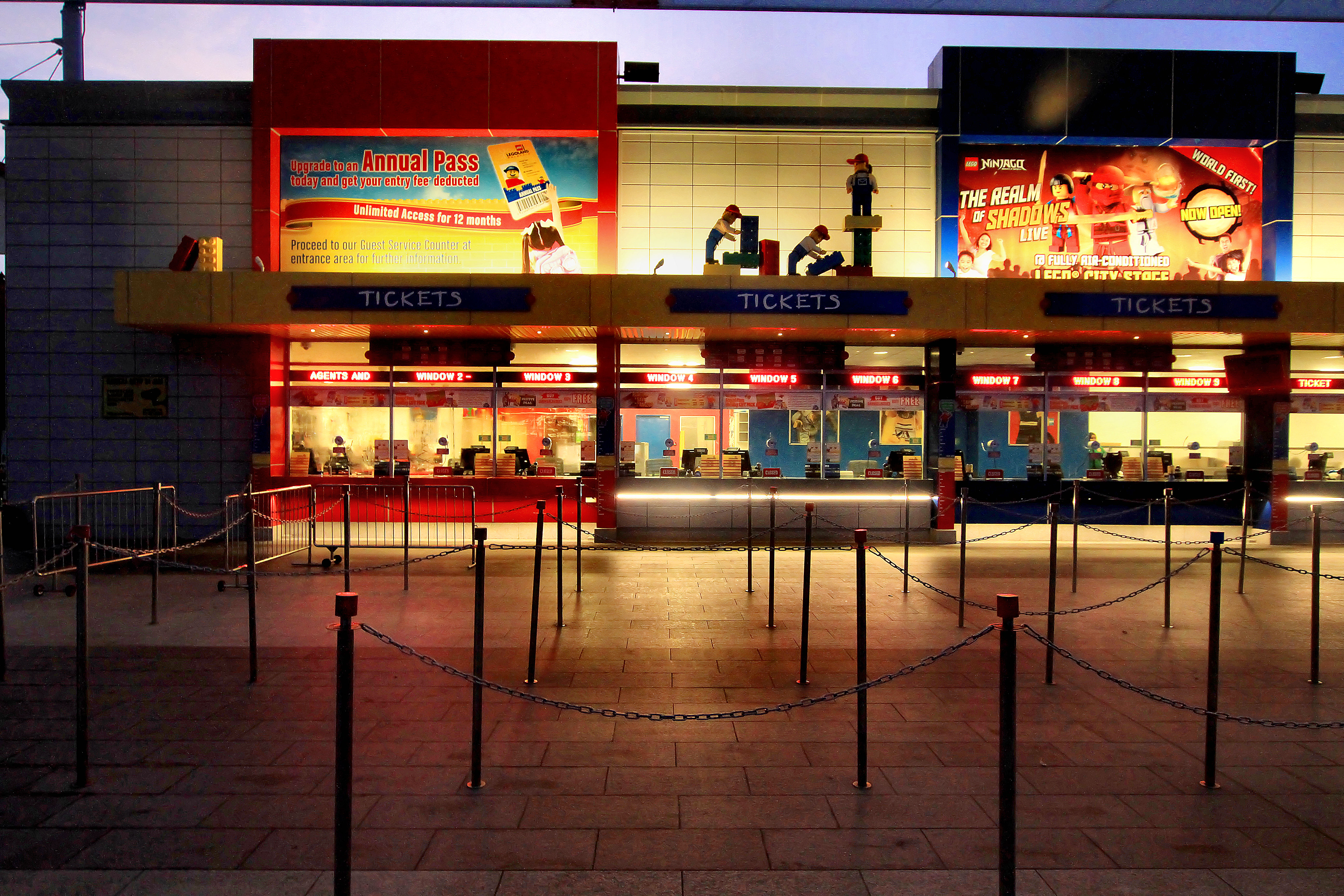
Ticket booths at The Beginning (2015)

The Beginning includes the park's welcome sign, admission ticket sales and entrance gates, and several shops specializing in LEGO bricks and sets, LEGO-themed merchandise, and visitor supplies. There are also several restaurants and snack stands in this area.

=== Technic ===
The Technic-themed area includes some of the fastest attractions in the park.

Attraction	Added	Mfr.	Image	Description
Aquazone Wave Racers	2012			Includes 4 water cannons arrayed around the twin circle tracks for spectators to splash water on the 12 riders.
The Great LEGO Race	2017	Mack Rides, Samsung (headsets)		World premiere of the first LEGO-themed virtual reality roller coaster; guests wear VR headsets. Later installed in 2018 at Legoland Deutschland Resort and Legoland Florida.
LEGO Academy	2012			
LEGO Mindstorms	2012			Robot design workshop.
Technic Twister	2012			Teacup-style ride. Capacity is 60 riders at a time in 12 teacups.

=== Kingdom ===
The medieval-themed LEGO Kingdom is at the park's southwestern end.

Attraction	Added	Mfr.	Image	Description
Castle Stage	2012			Capacity is 500 visitors per show.
The Dragon	2012			Capacity is 600 riders per hour on two separate dragon-themed trains. Maximum speed 60 km/h (37 mph)
The Dragon's Apprentice	2012			
The Forestman's Hideout	2012			Playground with a treehouse theme.
Merlin's Challenge	2012			High-speed carousel, 48 visitors at a time.
The Royal Joust	2012			20 horses, single riders.

=== Imagination ===
The Imagination area includes the Build and Test Centre, where visitors participate in an interactive attraction to build houses, cars, skyscrapers, etc. After building then you can test them out on the earthquake table. The area also includes the Kid Power Towers attraction, a Zierer junior drop tower ride where visitors pull a rope to propel their vehicle seat upward to the top of the tower; once they let go of the rope, they drop down the tower. This area also includes DUPLO-themed attractions for younger visitors.

Attraction	Added	Mfr.	Image	Description
Build & Test Centre	2012			
DUPLO Express	2012			5-carriage Ridable miniature railway, 10 riders at a time.
DUPLO Playtown	2012			Child-size city playground.
Kid's Power Tower	2012			200 visitors per hour; 9 metres (30 ft) ascent.
LEGO Studios	2012			"4D" movie adventure, accommodates 500 visitors per showing.
Observation Tower	2012			Capacity is 1,000 visitors per hour; observation platform is 41 metres (135 ft) above ground level.

=== Land of Adventure ===
Land of Adventure is designed to evoke the late 1800s and early 1900s, emphasizing the exploration of ancient civilizations by colonial powers.

Attraction	Added	Mfr.	Image	Description
Beetle Bounce	2012			4.6 metres (15 ft) tall drop ride.
Dino Island	2012			Log flume "canoe" voyage featuring a 12-metre (39 ft) waterfall drop. 3,000,000 litres (660,000 imp gal; 790,000 US gal) of water in total.
LEGO NINJAGO The Ride	2016	Triotech		Interactive dark ride, using motion-sensing technology.
Lost Kingdom Adventure	2012	Sally Corporation		Interactive (shooting) dark ride; capacity is 1,000 visitors per hour.
Pharaoh's Revenge	2012			Play area.

=== City ===
The City area is designed as a miniature town with attractions and rides controlled by children.

Attraction	Added	Mfr.	Image	Description
Boating School	2012			Accommodates up to three riders per boat.
Driving School	2012			Maximum speed of cars is 6 km/h (3.7 mph); guests have full control.
Junior Driving School	2012			Reduced speed, single-pedal control for younger drivers.
LEGO City Airport	2012			
LEGOLAND Express	2012			Capacity is 60 visitors at a time.
Rescue Academy	2012			Includes police and firefighter-themed vehicles.
The Shipyard	2012			Playground.

=== Miniland ===
Each LEGOLAND park contains a Miniland; the one at Malaysia reproduces iconic buildings and areas from Asia on a 1:20 scale. The reproduction of the Petronas Towers at Miniland Malaysia stand nearly 10 metres (33 ft) high and contain more than 500,000 LEGO bricks. In total, almost 30 million bricks were used over three years for the initial construction of Miniland. Miniland also includes two fictional areas: one themed for pirates, and another themed for Star Wars; the Star Wars exhibit was removed in 2019.

Country	Added	Closed	Image	Description
Brunei	2012	–		Featuring model of Sultan Omar Ali Saifuddin Mosque.
Cambodia	2012	–		Featuring model of Angkor Wat.
China	2012	–		Featuring models of The Forbidden City and Great Wall of China.
India	2012	–		Featuring model of Taj Mahal.
Indonesia	2012	–		Featuring model of Tanah Lot.
Laos	2012	–		Featuring model of Patuxai.
Malaysia	2012	–		Separate areas for Kuala Lumpur (featured models include Jamek Mosque, KLIA, Maybank Tower, Petronas Towers, Sultan Abdul Samad Building), Putrajaya (Perdana Putra, Putra Bridge, Putra Mosque), and Johor Bahru (Dataran Bandaraya Johor Bahru, Istana Bukit Serene, Sultan Ibrahim Stadium, Port of Tanjung Pelepas, Sultan Abu Bakar State Mosque, Sultan Ibrahim Building).
Myanmar	2012	–		Featuring model of Karaweik.
Philippines	2012	–		Featuring model of Bolinao, Pangasinan.
Pirates	2012	–		Fictional scenes based on the Strait of Malacca.
Singapore	2012	–		Featuring models of The Fullerton Hotel, Merlion Park, Riverside Point, and Singapore Flyer.
Star Wars	2014	2019		Fictional scenes from the films; removed after Disney acquired intellectual property licence.
Thailand	2012	–		Featuring model of Wat Arun.
Vietnam	2012	–		Featuring model of Hội An.

=== Water Park ===
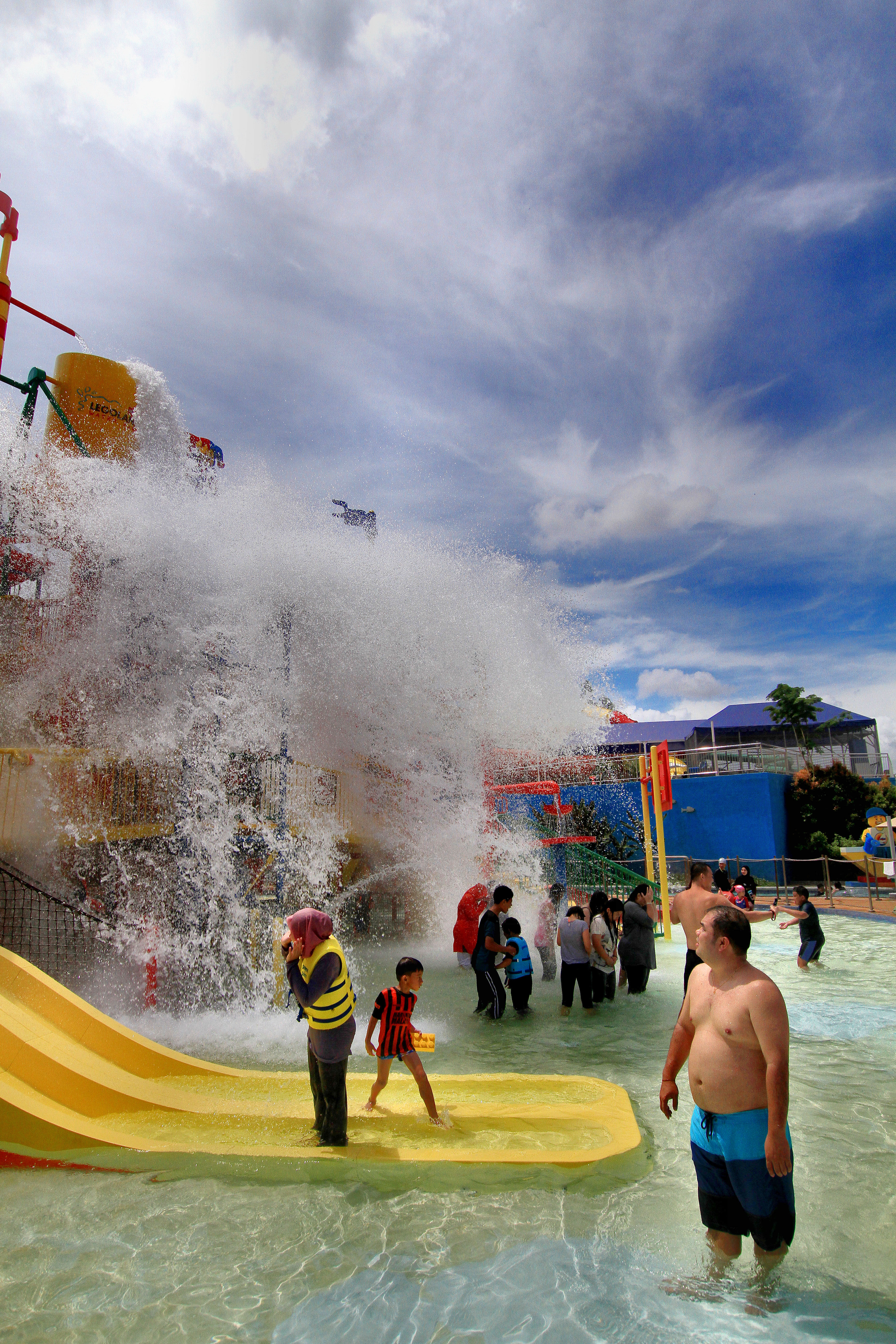
Joker Soaker (2015)

The water park was opened on 21 October 2013 and includes more than 20 water slides and 70 LEGO models; it incorporates attractions from other Legoland water parks, including Build-A-Raft (a lazy river with platforms to attach soft LEGO-like bricks) and Joker Soaker (a wading pool with a bucket that periodically showers guests with 350 US gallons (1,300 L; 290 imp gal) of water).

=== Sea Life Aquarium ===
Sea Life was opened on 29 June 2019 and features more than 25 display tanks in 11 habitat zones. The first admissions to Sea Life were part of a preview weekend held 7–8 May 2019 for season pass holders.

=== Retired attractions ===
Attraction	Years	Mfr.	Image	Description
Project X	2012–17			Wild Mouse roller coaster, 15 turns. Each car holds four riders; maximum elevation is 18 metres (59 ft). Replaced in 2017 by The Great LEGO Race.

== Roller coasters ==
Name	Manufacturer	Model	Opened	Status	Ref
Dragon	Zierer	Family	2012	Operating	
Dragon's Apprentice	Zierer	190	2012	Operating	
Great Lego Race	Mack Rides	Wilde Maus	2012	Operating	

== Public transportation ==
Legoland Malaysia Resort is easily accessible by bus and taxi.

Bus No.	Destinations
CW7L	Hotel Ramada Medini ↔ Tuas Link MRT station (Singapore) via Legoland Malaysia Resort
LM01	JB Sentral ↔ Terminal Gelang Patah via Legoland Malaysia Resort/Mall of Medini
IP01	Larkin Sentral (Medan Selera Johor) ↔ Puteri Harbour via Legoland Malaysia Resort/Mall of Medini
IP02	Puteri Harbour ↔ AEON Bukit Indah Shopping Centre via Legoland Malaysia Resort/Mall of Medini
IP03	Forest City (Johor) ↔ AEON Bukit Indah Shopping Centre via Legoland Malaysia Resort/Mall of Medini

In addition, there's a shuttle service from Sunway Hotel Big Box to Legoland operating between 9.30 AM to 10 AM (Departure to Legoland) and 5:00 PM and 5:30 PM (Return to Hotel).

== See also ==
- Legoland
- Lego
- 2012 in amusement parks
- Lego Technic Test Track
- Lost Kingdom Adventure
