= Wasco =

Wasco is the name of four places in the United States:

== Places ==
=== United States ===
- Wasco, California, a city in California.
  - Wasco State Prison, located in Wasco, California
- Wasco, Illinois, a former hamlet (unincorporated town) in Illinois, now part of Campton Hills
- Wasco, Oregon, a city in Oregon
- Wasco County, Oregon, a county in Oregon

=== Chile ===
- Wasco a city in Chile
- Wasco a province in Chile

=== Native American ===
Wasco may also mean:

- Wasco-Wishram, two Native American tribes from Oregon
- Wasco-Wishram language, a dialect of Upper Chinook, a Chinookan language

=== Companies ===
- Wasco Energy, an oil and gas service company specializing in pipeline coatings
