= Amber Chia =

Malaysian model, actress and TV host

- 谢丽萍
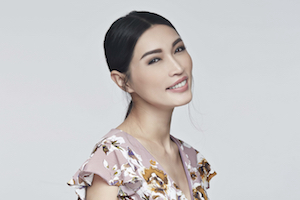
- Amber Chia in 2008.
- Born: Chia Lee Peng; 14 December 1981 (age 44); Teluk Intan, Perak, Malaysia
- Occupations: Model, actress, TV host, brand ambassador
- Spouse: Adrian Wong (m. 2010)
- Children: 1
- Modelling information
- Height: 5 ft 9 in (1.75 m)
- Hair colour: Black
- Eye colour: Dark Brown
- Agency: Amber Chia Academy (founder)
- Website: www.amberchia.com

Amber Chia (simplified Chinese: 谢丽萍; traditional Chinese: 謝麗萍; Pe̍h-ōe-jī: Chiā Lê-phêng, pinyin: Xiè Lìpíng; born 14 December 1981) is a Malaysian model, actress, TV host and brand ambassador. She was born in Teluk Intan, Malaysia but grew up in the town of Tawau in Sabah, East Malaysia. Chia started her own company called Amber Creations in mid-2009 and a modelling school Amber Chia Academy in August 2010.

== Early life ==
Chia was born in Teluk Intan, Perak. Due to her parents' hardship, she was taken care of by her foster parents since she was only eight years old. When she turned 12, Chia moved back to Tawau, Sabah. She left school at 15 to work full-time in order to help her family. In an interview with iMoney.my, Chia worked three jobs; selling fish at the market in the morning, sales at a small local mall during the day and a cashier at a pub at night.

== Career ==
Winner of the Guess Watches Timeless Beauty International Model Search 2004 title, Chia became the first Asian model to campaign for Guess Watches worldwide. The Star wrote that her non-nude appearance on the first issue of Indonesia Playboy in April 2006 led to "controversy". Victoria Beckham selected her to present the Victoria Beckham Autumn/Winter 2009 Ready to Wear Collection during the New York Fashion Week.

== Personal life ==
She married her business partner and manager, Adrian Wong in March 2010. Wong is the founder and director of CMG Absolute and has two children from a previous marriage. The couple has a son together named Ashton Wong; born September 2010. Ashton Wong is a child model. In March 2024, Chia revealed that she and Wong had separated over two years ago, and that they remain friends to date.
