= Riverside Point =

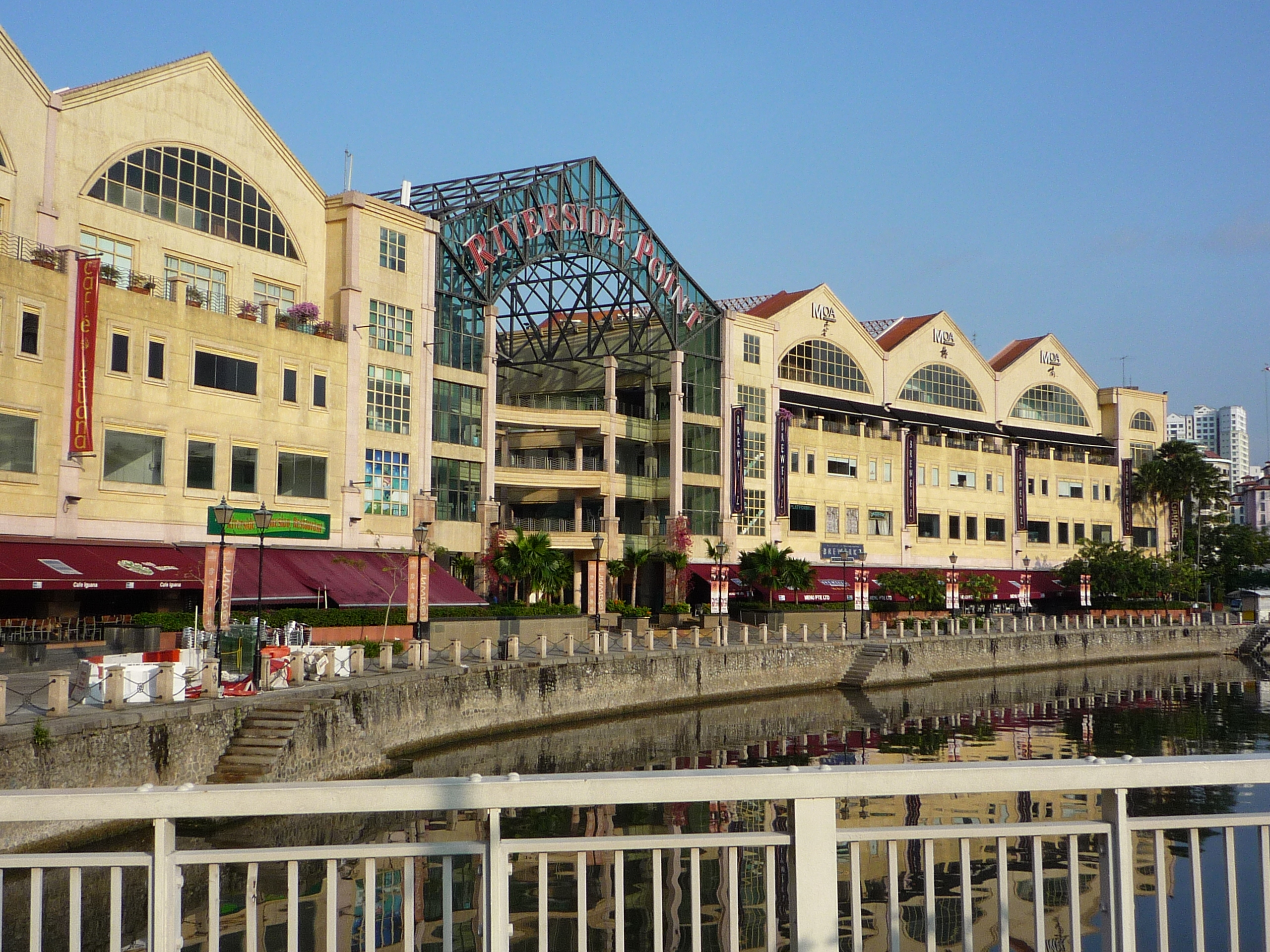
- Riverside Point from Read Bridge in 2008.
- Location: Singapore River, Singapore
- Coordinates: 1.289326°N 103.844174°E
- Address: 30 Merchant Road; Singapore 058282
- Opened: August 1996
- Developer: Far East Organization
- Public transit: NE5 Clarke Quay MRT station
- Website: www.fareastmalls.com.sg/en/riverside-point

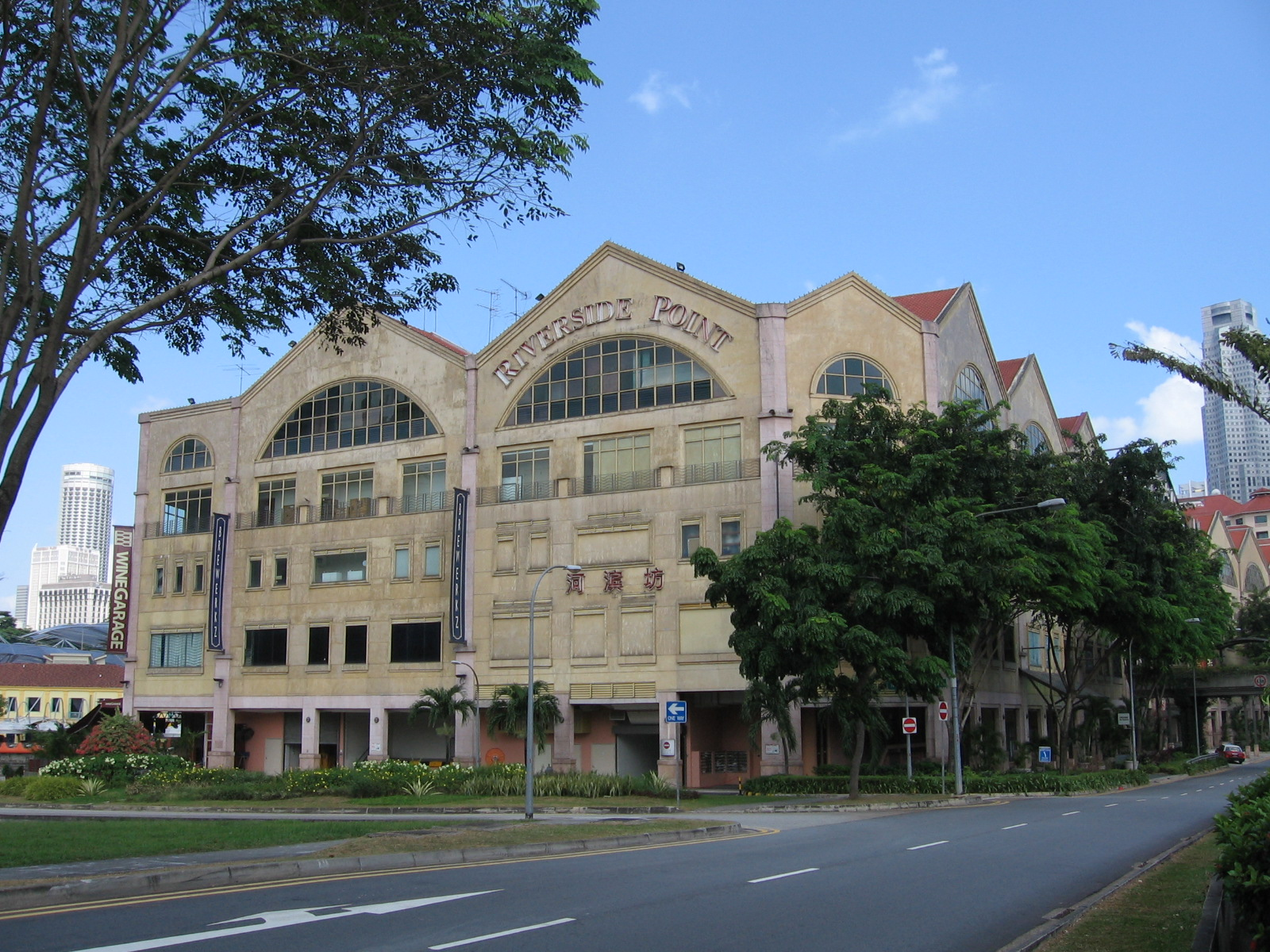
Riverside Point from Merchant Road in 2006.

Riverside Point is a mall on Merchant Road by the Singapore River. Opened in 1996, it was touted as a "lifestyle centre", modelled after Darling Harbour and intended to attract the "yuppies" working in the surrounding area.

== History ==
The four-storey Riverside Point was developed by the Far East Organization. The project, which was to cost $88 million, was touted by Far East as a "lifestyle centre", the "first centre of its kind to combine the variety of facilities and activities" in this way, modelled after Darling Harbour and The Rocks in Sydney. Designed by local architectural firm Andrew Tan Architects, it was to feature a pointed "arched, walk-through gateway", with "more spray paint and natural stone finish" than Darling Harbour and "a lot of metal frames". The design was to "retain much of the old-world charm" of the godowns which previously occupied the quays along the river.

The mall would feature a cineplex and playhouse and an art gallery in addition to food, shopping, a "high-technology video games centre", boutiques and a pavilion by the river dedicated to street entertainment. The mall was targeted at "yuppies aged 25 to 40" working in offices in the area. There were also plans for a river taxi stop at the mall. In February 1994, it was announced that Lian Beng Group was awarded a $30.38 million to build the shopping centre, for which construction had already begun. It was then expected that the mall would open by the end of the following year. It was announced in September that Riverside Point would offer "soft lines" as a home furnishing centre instead.

In April 1995, it was announced that the complex was now expected to be completed by the middle of 1996. However, due to an "industry slump" causing difficulties in finding retail tenants, Far East announced in December that they would consider converting half of the shop space on the complex's second and third floors into offices, though the fourth floor remained reserved for the cineplex. They ultimately followed through on this decision to convert some of its shop space into offices. In April 1996, it was announced that Lark International Entertainment would be operating the three-screen cineplex. The complex was then set to open in the third quarter of the year.

The complex opened in August 1996. The fourth floor was occupied by Lark's Studio City Cinema, which had a lobby lit with sunlight through large picture windows. This design allowed for the room to "appear more spacious". The complex features a tower 'landmark'. The ground floor featured an amphitheatre where the Singapore Dance Theatre were to give performances. The shopping centre then had restaurants serving Chinese, Thai and Indonesian cuisine. The following year, the country's first local microbrewery, Brewerkz opened on the shopping centre's ground floor. Due to "swelling crowds", the microbrewery then took over another unit. In April 2003, the Singapore History Museum moved temporarily to Riverside Point while its premises on Stamford Road were undergoing renovations.

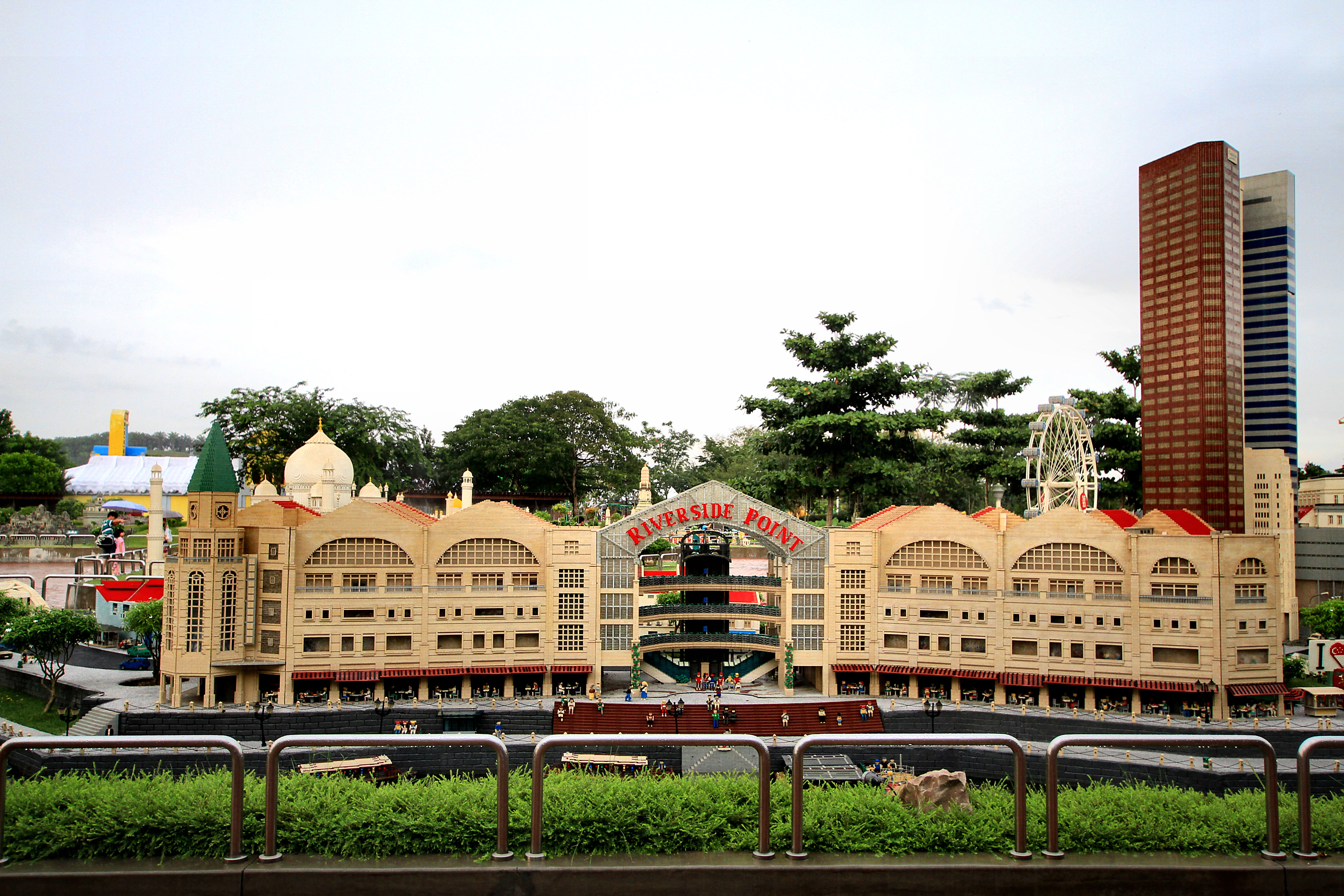
The miniature recreation of Riverside Point at Legoland Malaysia.

In July 2012, it was announced that several landmarks along the Singapore River, including Riverside Point, would receive miniature LEGO recreations at the Miniland display of Legoland Malaysia, which would open in September. In 2013, the Urban Redevelopment Authority imposed a new guideline which required bars and eateries to remove tables which were placed up by the river. This was followed by a shortening of the liquor licensing hours for bars and clubs in the area.
