= Kulim (Malaysia) Berhad =

- Type: State-owned enterprise
- Industry: Plantation (core business), Intrapreneur Venture, Oil and Gas
- Predecessor: Kulim Rubber Plantations Limited (1933–1975)
- Founded: 1933
- Headquarters: Johor Bahru, Johor, Malaysia
- Key people: Datuk Syed Mohamed Syed Ibrahim, Chairman; Mohd Faris Adli Shukery, Managing Director
- Revenue: ▼MYR 1,21 Billion (2019)
- Operating income: ▲MYR 267 million(2019)
- Net income: ▼MYR (109,974) million (2019)
- Total assets: MYR 6.70 Billion (2019)
- Number of employees: 9,135 (2019)
- Parent: Johor Corporation
- Website: www.kulim.com.my

Kulim (Malaysia) Berhad is a Malaysian company. Through its subsidiaries, it engages in oil palm plantation, investment holding, and property investment businesses in Malaysia. The company also manufactures rubber-based products, oleochemicals, and esters; produces oil palm clones by plant tissue culture technology; and distributes tropical fruits, as well as engaging in crude palm oil processing. The Corporate Office of Kulim (Malaysia) Berhad is located at Johor, Malaysia.

It provides plantation management and consultancy services, assembles agricultural and mechanical equipment and researches and produces oil palm seeds. It also operates quick service restaurants. It has operations primarily in Malaysia and Indonesia. The company was incorporated in 1933 and is based in Johor Bahru, Malaysia. Kulim (Malaysia) Berhad is a subsidiary of Johor Corporation.

== History ==
Kulim (Malaysia) Berhad traces its history back to 1933 when Kulim Rubber Plantations Ltd was incorporated in United Kingdom. Kulim was later incorporated as a public limited company and was listed on Main Board of the Kuala Lumpur Stock Exchange (now known as the Main Market of Bursa Malaysia Securities Berhad) in 1975. In 1976, Johor Corporation became the major shareholder of Kulim. Over the years, Kulim has grown to become a diversified plantation company and continues to strengthen its position by securing new hectarages while developing and strengthening its intrapreneur ventures. At the end of 2013, Kulim once again made its way into Indonesia with acquisition of 74% equity in PT Wisesa Inspirasi Nusantara, a plantation holding company in Indonesia, holding rights over 40,645 hectares of potential oil palm land in Central Kalimantan. With the completion of this strategic acquisition, as at the time of writing, the Kulim Group’s direct and indirect landholding stands at over 91,000 hectares (excluding NBPOL which was held for sale as at 31 December 2014), spread across Malaysia and Indonesia. After having footholds in O&G related businesses in Malaysia, Kulim had on 10 December 2014, entered into a Conditional Subscription and Shares Purchase.

Agreement with the existing shareholders of PT Citra Sarana Energi (“PT CSE”) for acquisition of 60% equity interest in the Company. This will enable Kulim to expand its involvement in the O&G sector particularly in Indonesia, moving up the value chain into the upstream activities - exploration and production.

== Core Business ==
=== Plantation ===
Kulim has operations currently spanning over Malaysia (within State Johor and Pahang) and Indonesia (Sumatera).

Region	Area (ha.)	Percentage	Total
Peninsular Malaysia	47,230	85%	55,501 (100%)
Indonesia	8,271	15%	55,501 (100%)

=== Malaysia Palm Oil Plantations Estate & Mills ===
Palm Oil Estates and also manage some of Johor Corporation Estates and smallholder cooperation

- Ladang Ulu Tiram, Johor Bahru
- Ladang Sedenak, Kulai
- Ladang Rengam, Kluang
- Ladang Basir Ismail, Johor Bahru
- Ladang REM, Kota Tinggi
- Ladang Siang, Kota Tinggi
- Ladang Sungai Papan, Kota Tinggi
- Ladang Sindora, Kluang
- Ladang Sungai Tawing, Kluang
- Ladang Mutiara, Kluang,
- Ladang Sungai Sembrong, Kluang
- Ladang Tereh Utara, Kluang
- Ladang Tereh Selatan, Kluang
- Ladang Selai, Kluang
- Ladang Enggang, Kluang
- Ladang Labis Bahru, Segamat
- Ladang Pasir Panjang, Kota Tinggi
- Ladang Pasir Logok, Kota Tinggi
- Ladang Bukit Kelompok, Kota Tinggi
- Ladang Kuala Kabong, Kulai
- Ladang Bukit Payong, Kota Tinggi
- Ladang Asam Bubok, Batu Pahat
- Ladang Palong, Segamat
- Ladang Sepang Loi, Segamat
- Ladang Kemedak, Segamat
- Ladang Mungka, Segamat
- Ladang UMAC, Pahang

=== Palm Oil Mill ===
- Sindora Palm Oil Mill, Kluang
- Sedenak Palm Oil Mill, Kulai
- Tereh Palm Oil Mill, Kluang
- Palong Cocoa & Palm Oil Mill, Segamat
- Pasir Panjang Palm Oil Mill, Kota Tinggi

=== Pineapple ===
- Kulim Pineapple Farm, Ulu Tiram
- KPF Tanah Abang, Mersing (Joint venture with other party)

=== Intrapreneur Venture ===
Established as one of Kulim’s principal growth thrust, Intrapreneur Ventures (“IV”) Division is involved in a diverse range of businesses including shipping and logistics, support operations for plantations, including agricultural machinery, oil palm nursery and mills maintenance, support operations for Oil and Gas (“O&G”) sector as well as IT-related services. With Kulim’s foray into the O&G upstream activities in Indonesia, O&G support services, namely E.A. Technique (M) Berhad and Danamin (M) Sdn Bhd, will be reclassified under the Group’s new O&G business segment effective 1 January 2015

== Subsidiaries ==
Some of the key subsidiaries are:-

- Sindora Berhad
- Mahamurni Plantations Sdn Bhd
- Kulim Plantations (Malaysia) Sdn Bhd
- Ulu Tiram Manufacturing Company (Malaysia) Sdn Bhd
- Kumpulan Bertam Plantations Berhad
- EPA Management Sdn Bhd
- Selai Sdn Bhd
- PT Wisesa Inspirasi Nusantara
- The Secret of Secret Garden Sdn Bhd
- E.A.Technique (M) Berhad
- Extreme Edge Sdn Bhd
- Edaran Badang Sdn Bhd
- Kulim Civilworks Sdn Bhd
- Pinnacle Platform Sdn Bhd
- Microwell Bio Solutions Sdn Bhd
- JTP Trading Sdn Bhd

== See also ==
- List of companies of Malaysia
