= Wah Seong Corporation =

Oil company

Wasco Berhad
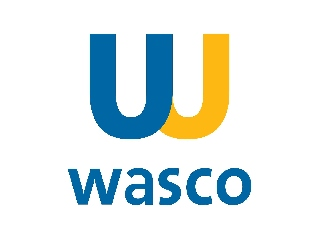
- Company type: Public limited company
- Traded as: MYX: 5142
- ISIN: MYL5142OO004
- Founded: 1994
- Headquarters: Suite 19.01, Level 19, The Gardens North Tower, Mid Valley City, Lingkaran Syed Putra, 59200 Kuala Lumpur, Malaysia
- Key people: Robert Tan Chung Meng, Chairman; Gian Carlo Maccagno, Managing Director/CEO
- Website: www.wascoenergy.com

Wasco Berhad (MYX: 5142) is a public listed company on the Main Board of the Bursa Malaysia. It was founded in 1994, and has a market capitalization of about US$300 million as of January 2007.

It is a major oil & gas service group in Asia and provides a wide range of services globally such as highly specialized pipe coating, corrosion protection, drilling supplies as well as EPC, fabrication and rental of gas compressors. Wasco is also a leading distributor and manufacturer of building materials and spiral welded steel pipes for water transmission and infrastructure use.

Wasco has companies and operations across the globe in Singapore, Indonesia, Australia, China, India, the UAE, Saudi Arabia, Nigeria and the USA, while its operational headquarters is in Kuala Lumpur, Malaysia.

The Wasco group employs more than 3,000 employees globally.

== Subsidiaries ==
- Wasco Coatings Group
- Wasco Corrosion Group
- PPS
- Wasco Engineering Group
- WOT Group
- Wasco China International Limited
- PMT Group
- Jutasama Group
- WS Agro Group
- Syn Tai Hung Group
- PPI Group
- Spirolite Group
- Boustead Wah Seong

== Wasco Energy ==
Headquartered in Kuala Lumpur, the company specializes in energy infrastructure products and services. Its product and service offerings include pipeline coatings, cathodic protection, pipe manufacturing, bespoke coating equipment, engineering and procurement, trading, and renewable energy.

=== Operations ===
Wasco Energy operates facilities and offices in Malaysia, Indonesia, Australia, Singapore, Myanmar, UAE, USA, Nigeria, China, Norway, UK, the Netherlands, Italy, Argentina, and Mexico. Its parent company is the largest pipe coating group in the Asia Pacific market, with its fully integrated pipe coating plant in Kuantan, Pahang, Malaysia serving as its primary coating base, and Kanssen (Yadong) coating plants in China accounting for the rest of Wasco's coating capacity in Asia Pacific. In 2013 the company built a new pipe coating facility in Mo I Rana, Norway as a result of its first major European contract with Statoil. The company has also constructed a flow assurance coating facility in Louisiana with American pipe coating group Bayou Companies as part of the Bayou Wasco Insulation LLC joint venture between the two companies. In 2013, its parent company Wah Seong Corporation Berhad announced plans to invest RM2.3billion (US$744million) over the following ten years to develop a 180,000ha agro-industrial complex 800 km north of Brazzaville, Republic of Congo.

=== Products ===
In 2013, Wasco Energy was awarded the Offshore Technology Conference's "Spotlight on Technology" Award for the application of Dow Chemical Company's Neptune insulation coating. The company offers applications of deepwater pipeline coating for the oil and gas industries, as well as engineering design, procurement, fabrication, installation, commissioning and operation & maintenance (O&M) services. Wasco has supplied offshore flow assurance coatings for Shell Oil Company (Gumusut-Kakap, Saderi), and Petronas (Turkmenistan Block 1, PC4). The company has won coating projects contracts from Chevron for the Gorgon Project, from Australia Pacific LNG (APLNG) for Narrows Crossing, and from Statoil for Polarled. Wasco Energy operates brands such as Petro-Pipe, PPSC (Petro Pipe Socotherm), TKPS (Turn Key Pipeline Services) BV, Kanssen Yadong (Wasco China), and Wasco Lindung.

== See also ==
- List of oilfield service companies
- List of companies of Malaysia
