= Scientex Berhad =

- Formerly: Scientex Incorporated Berhad
- Company type: Public limited company
- Traded as: MYX: 4731
- ISIN: MYL4731OO005
- Founded: 25 June 1968
- Founder: Lim Teck Meng
- Headquarters: No.9, Persiaran Selangor, Seksyen 15, 40200 Shah Alam, Selangor, Malaysia
- Key people: Mohd Sheriff Mohd Kassim, Chairman; Lim Peng Jin, Managing Director/Chief Executive Officer
- Website: www.scientex.com.my

Scientex Berhad (MYX: 4731) is a Malaysian manufacturing and property company.

== Background ==
Scientex was established in 1968 as Scientific Textile Industries Sendirian Berhad and pioneered the manufacturing of polyvinyl chloride (PVC) leather cloth and sheeting. Scientex is one of the producers of stretch film and producer of the flexible plastic packaging industry, as well as a developer of homes in Malaysia.

Scientex has diversified its activities into other industries such as manufacturing and distribution of automotive components, and industrial packaging products. Scientex has also entered into property development in various states in Malaysia such as Johor, Melaka, Negeri Sembilan, Selangor, Perak, Penang, and Kedah.

== Subsidiaries ==
=== Manufacturing ===
- Scientex Packaging Film Sdn Bhd
- Scientex Tsukasa Strapping Sdn Bhd
- Scientex Great Wall Sdn Bhd
- Scientex Great Wall (Klang) Sdn Bhd (formerly known as Klang Hock Plastic Industries Sdn Bhd)
- Scientex Great Wall (Ipoh) Sdn Bhd (formerly known as Mondi Ipoh Sdn Bhd)
- Scientex Industries Group Sdn Bhd
- Scientex Tsukasa (Vietnam) Co., Ltd.
- PT. Scientex Indonesia
- Scientex Phoenix, LLC
- Scientex International (S) Pte Ltd
- MCTI Scientex Solar Sdn Bhd
- Mitsui Chemicals Scientex (M) Sdn Bhd
- Scientex Packaging (Ayer Keroh) Berhad (formerly known as Daibochi Berhad)
- Scientex Packaging (Teluk Emas) Sdn Bhd (formerly known as Mega Printing and Packaging Sdn Bhd)
- Daibochi Packaging (Myanmar) Co. Ltd. (Ceased operations on June 9, 2025)

=== Property ===
- Scientex Quatari Sdn Bhd
- Scientex Park (M) Sdn Bhd
- Scientex (Skudai) Sdn Bhd
- Scientex Heights Sdn Bhd
- Scientex (Senai) Sdn Bhd
- Texland Sdn Bhd
- KC Contract Sdn Bhd
- Scientex Rawang Sdn Bhd
