= Johor Corporation =

State owned corporation

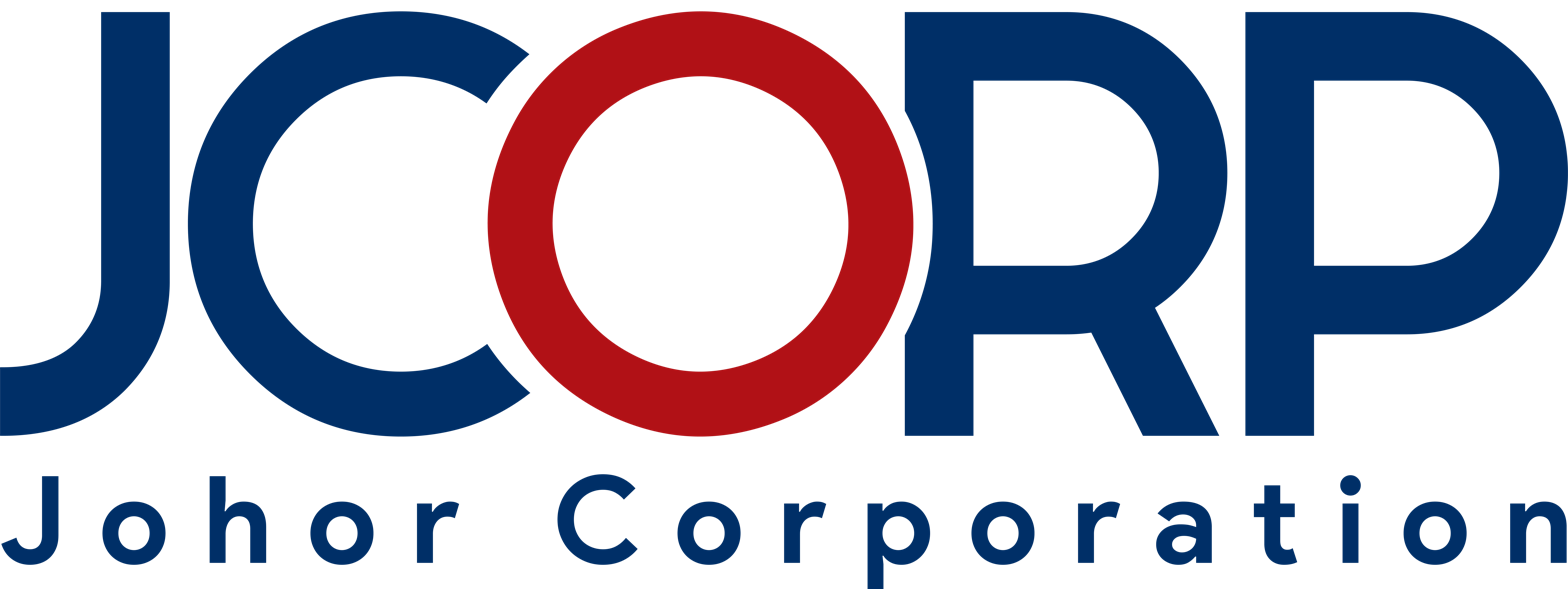
- Type: State-owned
- Industry: Investment Management
- Founded: 1968
- Headquarters: Johor Bahru, Johor, Malaysia
- Key people: Datuk Onn Hafiz Ghazi (Chairman); Datuk Syed Mohamed Syed Ibrahim (President & Chief Executive)
- Total assets: ▲MYR11.8 billion (2025)
- Owner: State Government of Johor
- Number of employees: ▲157 (2025)
- Subsidiaries: Kulim (Malaysia) Berhad; KPJ Healthcare Berhad; QSR Brands (M) Holdings; JLand Group (JLG); Johor Capital Group (JCG)
- Website: www.jcorp.com.my

Johor Corporation (JCorp, Malay: Perbadanan Johor) is Johor’s principal development institution for the State of Johor, Malaysia. Headquartered in Johor Bahru, its operations extend across multiple countries including Malaysia, Singapore, Brunei, Australia, Thailand, Cambodia and Bangladesh.

JCorp’s flagship companies Kulim (Malaysia) Berhad, KPJ Healthcare Berhad, QSR Brands (M) Holdings Bhd and JLand Group Sdn Bhd spearhead the Group’s interest across four core sectors, namely: agribusiness, wellness & healthcare, food & restaurant, real estate & infrastructure and patient capital.

As an investment holding corporation, its primary goal is premised on its mission of Membina & Membela (Creating Value, Enabling Sustainable Communities).

The corporation has maintained corporate global credit ratings of "AAA/Stable/P1" by the rating agency RAM Ratings since 2022. In 2024 this was reaffirmed. RAM Ratings has also affirmed the AAA ratings of JCorp’s RM3.5 billion Islamic Medium-Term Notes Programme and RM2 billion State-Guaranteed Islamic Medium Term Notes Programme.

== Board of directors ==
Given JCorp's role as a state agency, the Menteri Besar Johor holds the position of Chairman of the Board of Directors.

The board is composed of the President and Chief Executive, six officials from the Johor Civil Service, Federal Government officials and two other independent directors:

- Three officials of the Johor Civil Service:
  - the secretary of state;
  - the state legal advisor;
  - the state financial officer;
- Three officials of the Federal Government:
  - the secretary-general of Treasury, Ministry of Finance;
  - the secretary-general of the Ministry of Economy; and
  - the secretary secretary-general of the Ministry of Trade and Industry; and
- Two independent directors appointed amongst the business community.

== History ==
JCorp was incorporated as Perbadanan Kemajuan Negeri Johor (PKENJ) or Johor State Economic Development Corporation (JSEDC) by the Johor State Government under enactment No. 4/1968, which was passed on 18 May 1968 as the principal development institution to drive the growth of the state’s economy. It was later amended in 1995 and renamed to Johor Corporation (Pindaan; Enakmen No. 5/1995).

The corporation was initially funded with a RM10 million loan from the State Government to fund its entry into the plantation business. JCorp has had three significant stages of evolution over the past 50 years.

JCorp 1.0 commenced in 1968 and was mandated to eradicate poverty and to organise society.

The Group transitioned into JCorp 2.0 stage in 1995 to accelerate economic growth. With a net asset value of RM2.2 billion at the time, JCorp was Malaysia's largest SEDC.

In 2020, JCorp 3.0 was initiated to reinvent, reset, reimagine and future-proof its businesses.

In 2026, JCorp announced JCorp 4.0, its strategic plan for 2026-2030. According to the corporation, the plan includes the use of artificial intelligence in operations and investment decisions-making, alongside organisational changes and workforce development.

== Investments ==
JCorp's investments are focused on its core businesses, agribusiness, wellness and healthcare, food and restaurant, and Real Estate and infrastructure.

=== Agribusiness ===
==== Kulim (Malaysia) Berhad ====
Kulim (Malaysia) Berhad, a wholly owned subsidiary of Johor Corporation, focuses on two core business segments: plantations and agrofood.

Following a business reorganization, Kulim's Malaysian plantation operations were consolidated under Johor Plantations Group Berhad. The company owns and managed oil plantations and mills, principally in Johor, and processes fresh fruit bunches into crude palm oil and palm kernels.

Kulim divested its interests in several Indonesian plantation companies in 2007. On 6 July 2023, it disposed of its entire equity interests in PT Tempirai Palm Resources and PT Rumbang Agro Jaya to PT Bakung Starch Lestari.

==== Johor Plantations Group Berhad (JPG) ====
Johor Plantations Group Berhad (JPG), formerly known as Johor Plantations Berhad/Mahamurni Plantations Sdn Bhd, aspires to lead the charge in RSPO-certified sustainable palm oil production and regenerative agriculture. Through collaboration with MPOB, JPG produced Clonal Palm Series 3 (CPS3), which is a high-quality oil palm clone capable of increasing productivity through higher Fresh Fruit Brunches (FFB) yields and OER, to be offered for commercial cultivation.

All estates and mills are RSPO-certified; four of their mills have Identity Preserved (IP) status where CPO from these mills can be traced to their source which, in turn, have been certified.

It was listed on the main market of Bursa Malaysia on 9 July 2024. The July IPO raised RM735 million through the offer of 875 million shares, marking the largest IPO since March 2022 and demonstrating strong market interest in its growth potential.

=== Wellness and healthcare ===
==== KPJ Healthcare Berhad ====
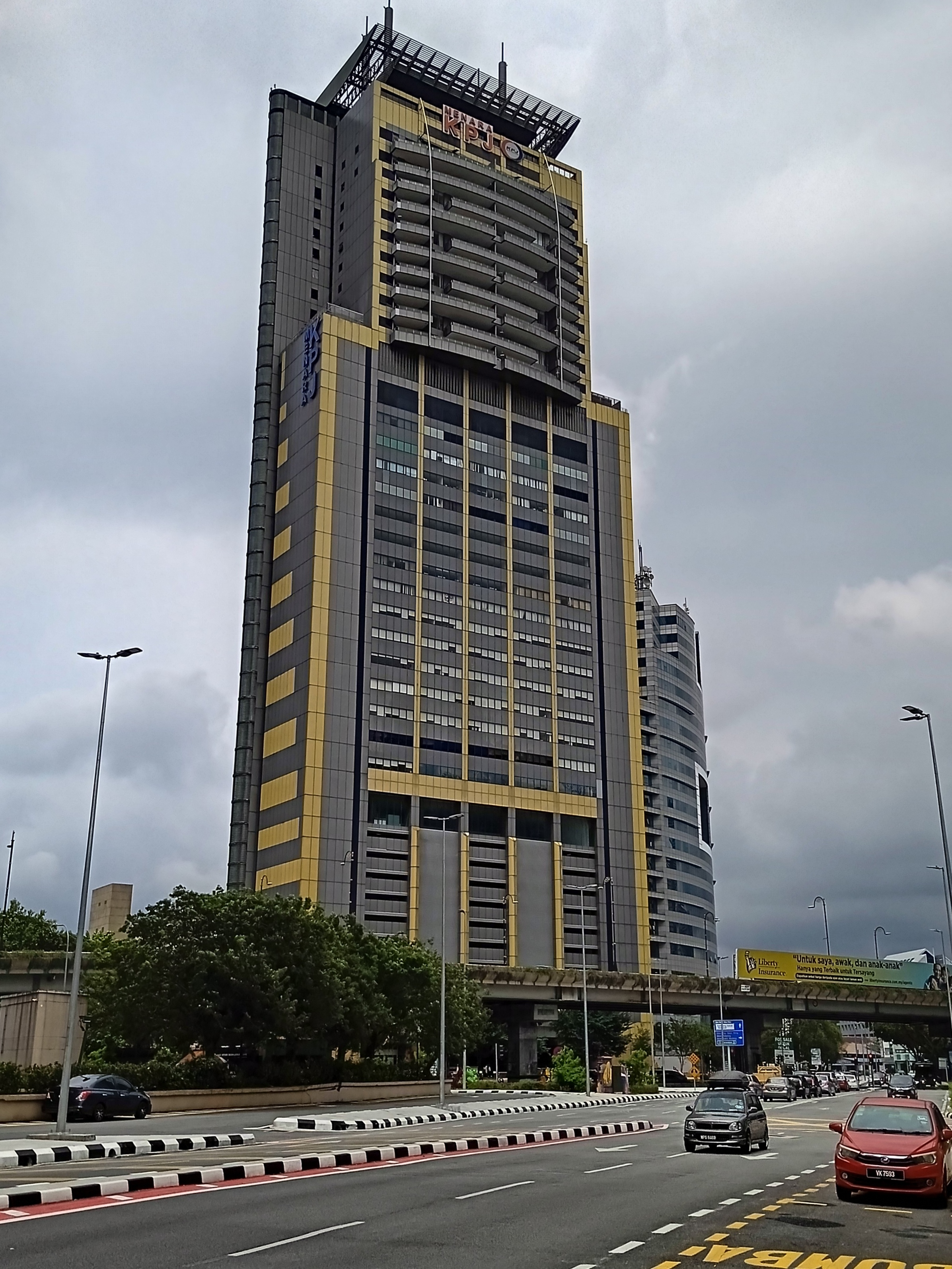
Menara KPJ

KPJ Healthcare Berhad (KPJ Healthcare), founded in 1982, operates a network comprising 29 specialist hospitals, 4 ambulatory care centres, and 2 senior and assisted living care centres in Malaysia. Additionally, KPJ Healthcare has extended its operations internationally with facilities in Thailand and Bangladesh. The company’s headquarters, Menara KPJ, is located in Kuala Lumpur.

KPJ Healthcare is listed on the Main Market of Bursa Malaysia, with a market capitalisation of RM7.9 billion as of 26 July 2024. The company’s primary focus is the management of a comprehensive network of specialist hospitals. Four of its hospitals are accredited by the Joint Commission International (JCI), and nineteen are accredited by the Malaysian Society for Quality in Health (MSQH).

In February 2024, KPJ Healthcare announced a strategic collaboration with Mayo Clinic involving KPJ Damansara Specialist Hospital (KPJ DSH) and Damansara Specialist Hospital 2 (DSH2). This partnership marks Malaysia’s first entry into the Mayo Clinic Care Network.

==== Klinik Waqaf An-Nur (KWAN) ====
Klinik Waqaf An-Nur (KWAN] was established in 1998 by Johor Corporation (JCorp) through Waqaf An-Nur Corporation Berhad in collaboration with KPJ Healthcare Berhad. The primary objective of KWAN is to offer accessible and affordable healthcare services, focusing on low-income and marginalised populations.

Since its inception, the KWAN network has expanded significantly. Currently, it includes 11 clinics, one of which is accredited by the Malaysian Society for Quality in Health (MSQH), 9 haemodialysis centers, and 10 mobile clinics throughout Malaysia. Additionally, KPJ operates 7 mobile clinics, with the first launched in Johor in 2012 and the second in Selangor in 2013. KWAN has provided healthcare services to approximately 1.8 million patients.

==== KPJ Healthcare University (KPJU) ====
KPJ Healthcare University College (KPJU), established in 1991 and situated in Negeri Sembilan, Malaysia, is an educational institution focused on health sciences. The college provides over 40 academic programmes designed to train healthcare professionals. KPJU supports the expansion of KPJ Healthcare’s hospital network by supplying skilled medical personnel.

KPJU integrates academic training with practical clinical experience through its association with KPJ hospitals across Malaysia. This approach allows students to gain hands-on experience and learn directly from industry professionals, aligning theoretical knowledge with practical application.

The partnership between KPJ and Mayo Clinic contributes to KPJU’s curriculum and training methods, incorporating international practices and advanced medical knowledge.

=== Food and restaurant ===
==== QSR Brands (M) Holdings Bhd ====
QSR Brands (M) Holdings Bhd (QSR) is a Malaysian food operator based in Malaysia. The company operates a network of over 850 KFC restaurants in Malaysia, Singapore, Brunei, and Cambodia, and manages more than 500 Pizza Hut outlets in Malaysia and Singapore. QSR also owns the Life brands, expanding its presence in the food industry.

QSR and its subsidiaries are accredited by the Department of Islamic Development Malaysia (JAKIM) for compliance with halal standards, ensuring their operations adhere to Islamic dietary laws.

==== Connected kitchen innovation ====
QSR implements connected kitchen solutions to enhance operational efficiency and food safety across its outlets. This includes the use of real-time data analytics and automation to manage inventory, reduce waste, and maintain food quality. These technological advancements aim to improve both operational processes and customer experience.

=== Real estate and infrastructure ===
==== Jland Group Sdn Bhd (JLG) ====
JLand Group Sdn Bhd (JLG) is a wholly owned subsidiary of JCorp, focused on developing digital and sustainable ecosystems in the real estate and infrastructure sectors. JLG’s activities include real estate development, asset lifecycle management (ALM), real estate investment trusts (REITs), and infrastructure and utilities. JLG’s portfolio features 34 industrial parks and six townships. The company manages 2.5 million square feet of office and retail space. As of the latest financial data, JLG has a market capitalisation of RM1.14 billion and manages assets valued at RM3 billion. The company is involved in sectors such as logistics, data centres, and renewable energy.

=== Patient Capital ===
==== Johor Capital Group (JCG) ====
Johor Capital Group (JCG) is Johor Corporation's strategic investment arm, representing the group's patient capital business segment. Its mandate is to provide long-term investment in infrastructure, technology and industrial development in Johor.

JCG's investment focus includes digital infrastructure, health and life sciences, electrical and electronics, advanced manufacturing, and emerging technologies. It works with investors, industry operators and technology partners to develop businesses and infrastructure in these sectors.

=== Partnerships and innovations ===
As Johor Corporation (JCorp) advances further upstream across strategic industry value chains, CEREBRUM by JCorp was established as a next-generation growth, innovation, and ecosystem platform designed to engage in upstream strategic discussions, catalyse future growth ecosystems for both JCorp and Johor, and facilitate coordinated “One JCorp” action across the organisation.

JLG also has partnered with Sojitz Corporation on a three-year feasibility study for decarbonisation through hydrogen fuel in Johor. This study aims to develop a sustainable hydrogen fuel supply chain from ammonia importation.

=== Forward-thinking developments ===
JLG is undertaking projects such as Ibrahim Technopolis (IBTEC) and the rejuvenation of Johor Bahru City Centre (IIBD). IBTEC is planned as a technological hub to support innovation and attract high-tech industries, while the IIBD project seeks to revitalize Johor Bahru’s urban core to enhance its role as a commercial and residential centre.

=== Sustainability ===
JCorp has developed a Sustainability Framework and established a Board of Sustainability Committee with the goal of achieving net-zero status by 2050 and to expedite its environmental, social, and governance (ESG) efforts.

==== Yayasan Johor Corporation ====
Yayasan JCorp is dedicated to executing the corporate social responsibility (CSR) initiatives of JCorp and its affiliated companies. Yayasan JCorp prioritises four key areas to enhance community quality of life: education; arts, culture, and heritage; environmental programmes; and community well-being.
