= Kossan Rubber Industries =

Malaysian rubber company

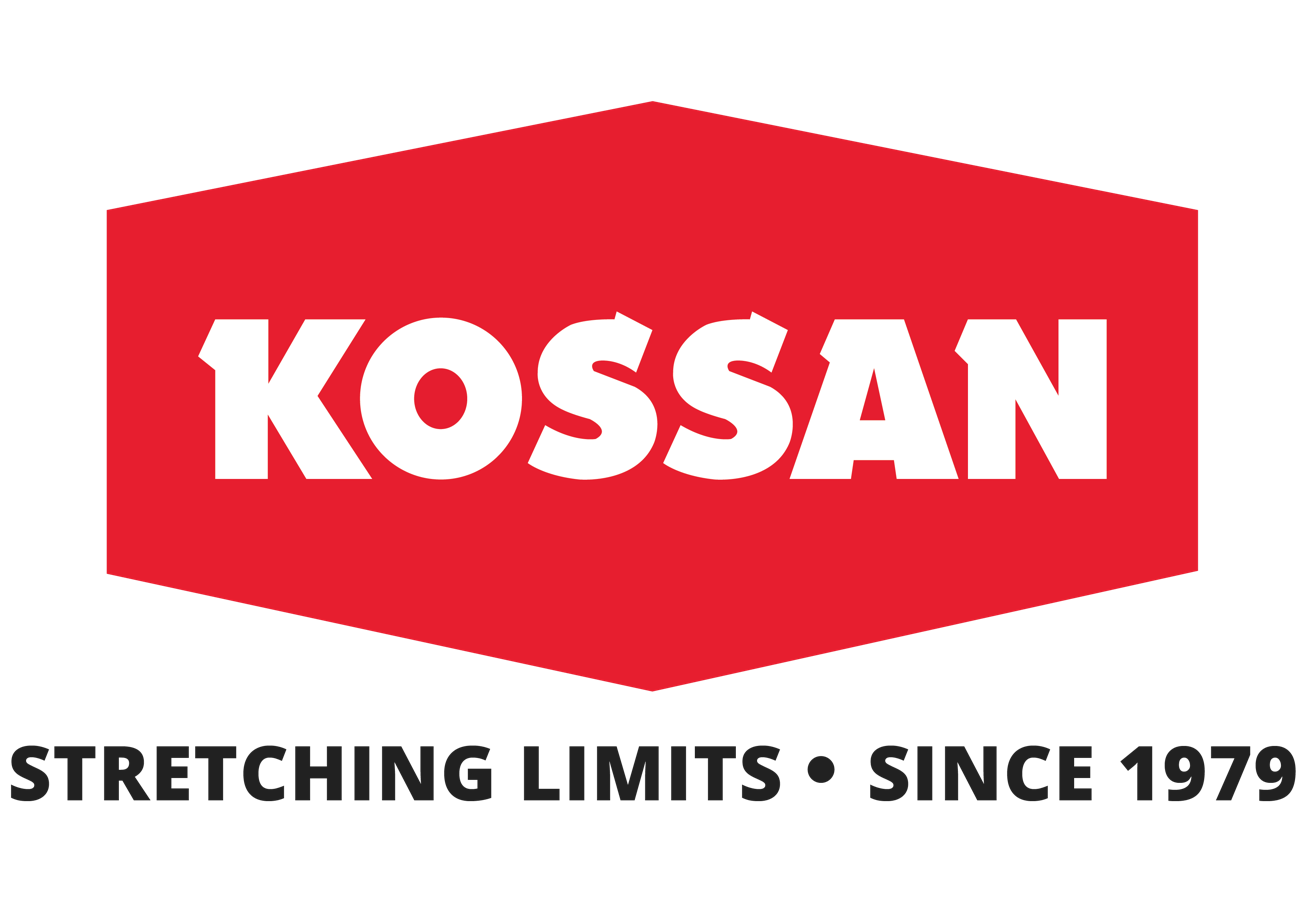

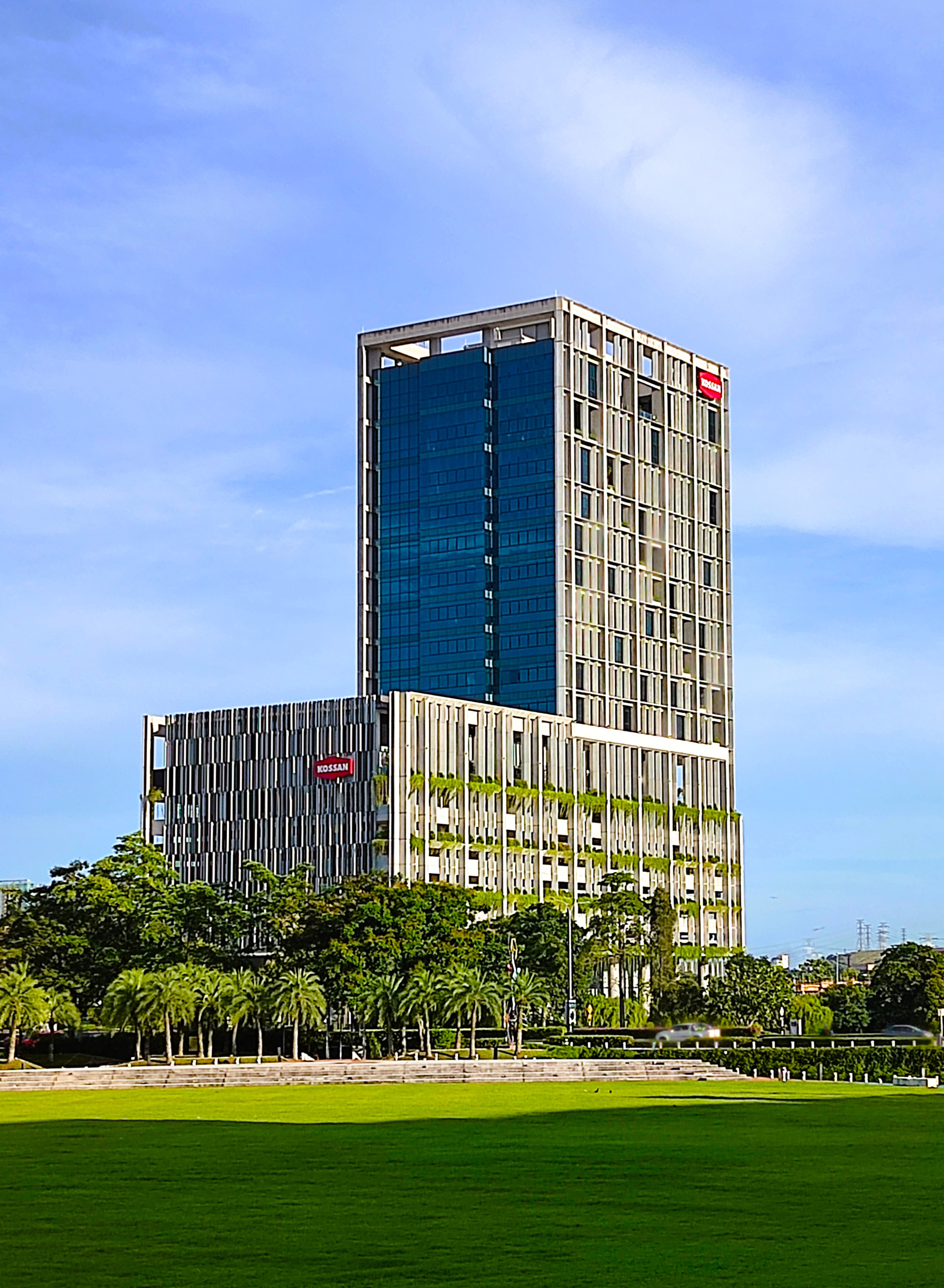
- Type: Public limited company
- Industry: Industrial and Medical equipments
- Founded: 1979
- Founder: Tan Sri Dato' Lim Kuang Sia
- Headquarters: Selangor, Malaysia
- Owner: Kossan Holdings (M) Sdn Bhd
- Number of employees: 5930 (2024)
- Website: kossan.com.my

Kossan Rubber Industries is a Kuala Lumpur based public limited company engaged in manufacture, sale, and export of rubber products. It was founded by Tan Sri Dato’ Lim Kuang Sia in 1979. KOSSAN has to-date an annual gloves production capacity of 32 billion pieces and a compounding capacity of technical rubber products exceeding 10,000 metric tonne per annum.

== Company Overview ==
The company was founded in 1979 by Tan Sri Dato’ Lim Kuang Sia. They initially produced cutlass bearing, and started manufacturing gloves in 1989. Today it has a production capacity of 25 billion pieces annually. Its product segments include; technical rubber products, medical gloves, cleanroom products and others. Its subsidiaries are;

- Doshin Rubber Products (M) Sdn. Bhd. (1984)
- Quality Profile Sdn. Bhd.
- Premium Medical Products Sdn. Bhd.
- Kossan Latex Industries (M) Sdn. Bhd. (1988)
- Ideal Quality Sdn. Bhd.
- Cleanera (M) Sdn. Bhd
- Kossan International Sdn. Bhd.
- Kossan Gloves Sdn Bhd.
- Hibon Corporation Sdn. Bhd.(1977)
- Cleanera HK Limited
- KISB Asia Pacific Sdn. Bhd.(2010)
- Kossan Industries Sdn. Bhd.

Kossan is one of the largest producer of disposable latex and nitrile gloves in Malaysia, the second largest in the world. They export to over 190 countries. They are ISO 13485:2003, EN ISO 13485:2012, ISO 13485:2003-CMDCAS and ISO 9001:2008 certified[1] and is listed in Kuala Lumpur Stock Exchange.

Their revenue in 2017 was RM 1.96 billion and net profit was RM182.06 million.

In 2020, the COVID-19 global pandemic drove demands for rubber gloves. During this time, Kossan saw its stock value doubled. Kossan's founder, Dato' Lim Kuang Sia, became a new billionaire in Malaysia with a reported net worth of $1.1 billion. The company is also expanding its production line in Bidor, Perak since there is a surge on gloves demand.

In November 2020, the company donated a total of RM50 million to the Government's COVID-19 fund set up to battle the pandemic.

KOSSAN has to-date an annual gloves production capacity of 32 billion pieces and a compounding capacity of technical rubber products exceeding 10,000 metric tonne per annum.

== Partnerships ==
In 2017, the subsidiary of KRI, Doshin Rubber Products entered into a partnership with Universiti Teknologi MARA for mutual sharing of resources and expertise.
