= HELP International Corporation =

HELP International Corporation Berhad
- Company type: Private Limited Company
- Industry: Diversified consumer services
- Founded: 20 June 2005
- Headquarters: Level 11, Wisma HELP, Lorong Dungun Kiri, Damansara Heights, 50490 Kuala Lumpur, Malaysia

HELP International Corporation Berhad (also known as HIC) is an investment holding company based in Kuala Lumpur, Malaysia. It was a public listed company on Bursa Malaysia. It was listed on 22 May 2007. It was delisted in January 2014.
