= Adventa =

Malaysian holding company

Adventa Berhad
- Company type: Public limited company
- Traded as: MYX: 7191
- ISIN: MYL7191OO009
- Industry: Health care
- Founded: 2004
- Headquarters: No 21, Jalan Tandang 51/205A, Seksyen 51, 46050 Petaling Jaya, Selangor, Malaysia
- Area served: Worldwide
- Key people: Edmond Cheah Swee Leng, Chairman
- Products: Health care products, medical products
- Revenue: ▲RM 34.797 million (2014)
- Net income: ▼RM 4.330 million (2014)
- Subsidiaries: List of subsidiaries
- Website: www.adventa.com.my

Adventa Berhad (MYX: 7191) is a Malaysian holding company. It is headquartered in Petaling Jaya, Selangor, and is part of the Management of Companies and Enterprises Industry. It was founded in 2004. Adventa initially invested in the glove-making business. In 2012, the group divested the glove business to Aspion. The group then acquired Electron Beam and Lucenxia, which led them into the health care businesses. Their business also includes distribution and third-party logistics (3PL) for other health care companies.

In 2013, the group signed a partnership with Crawford Healthcare Limited, a United Kingdom healthcare company, to distribute the wound care products, Kerra™. The firm set up a new online portal, MyCare, selling healthcare and beauty products.

In 2014, the company will start its home renal dialysis service, which is known as the company's flagship business.

Adventa secured a 3-year contract with Parkway Malaysia, Singapore and Turkey. Contributions may be seen from Q2 year 2015 onwards.

== Subsidiaries ==
The group has multiple subsidiaries. Sun Healthcare Sdn. Bhd. delivers medical and healthcare supplies. Sun Healthcare Sdn. Bhd has been renamed as Advanta Healthcare Bhd since 1 January 2022. Electron Beam Sdn. Bhd. provides commercial and industrial sterilization of medical devices and other sterilizable products. Lucenxia (M) Sdn. Bhd. offers home renal dialysis services.
