= Iskandar Investment Berhad =

- Formerly: South Johor Investment Corporation Berhad
- Type: Private Limited Company
- Founded: November 2006
- Headquarters: Medini Iskandar, Iskandar Malaysia, Johor, Malaysia
- Key people: Dato' Idzham Mohd Hashim, President/CEO
- Website: www.iskandarinvestment.com

Iskandar Investment Berhad (Malay: Syarikat Permodalan Iskandar), or IIB, is a corporate entity providing investment capital to the development corridor of Iskandar Malaysia, in South Johor at the tip of the Malay Peninsula. It was formed on 2 November 2006 as South Johor Investment Corporation Berhad. IIB focuses on Iskandar Puteri (previously known as Nusajaya) or Flagship Zone B. A Heads of Agreement was signed to form a new company to drive the development of catalyst projects (previously referred to as a "super developer"). The Iskandar Investment shareholding structure is as follows: Khazanah Nasional (60%), EPF (20%) and Kumpulan Prasarana Rakyat Johor Berhad (KPRJ) (20%), a company wholly owned by the Johor State Government. The definitive agreements were signed on 19 December 2006 and completed in May 2007.

IIB was set up with total assets worth approximately RM3.4bn of land and cash on the outset. It was also set up to own a significant land bank in South Johor through various subsidiaries and joint venture companies. Syed Mohamed Syed Ibrahim was appointed as the president and CEO of Iskandar Investment Berhad.

IIB was slated to lead the implementation of various strategic and catalyst Iskandar Malaysia initiatives, including implementing of some of the major Ninth Malaysia Plan projects within the Iskandar Malaysia development corridor, through various Special Purpose Vehicles and partnerships with the private sector. It does this through investing in selected strategic initiatives in joint ventures or contribution of land either through sale or lease, or through granting of a concession or development rights.
