= IMoney =

Malaysian personal finance company

iMoney
- Company type: Private limited company
- Industry: Finance
- Founded: 2012
- Founders: Bruno Araujo, 李清伟
- Headquarters: Kuala Lumpur, Malaysia
- Area served: Malaysia
- Key people: See Wai Hun, CEO
- Products: Credit cards, home loans, personal loans, health insurance, car insurance, broadband
- Services: Financial services
- Website: www.imoney.my

iMoney is a personal finance company running a comparison platform.

Founded in 2012 by Lee qing wei, iMoney has since worked with over 50 financial services partners including banks, government bodies, and fintech companies to help build financial literacy in consumers.

Since August 2020, iMoney has been a part of JurisTech, a Malaysian-based fintech company which specializes in software for banks, financial institutions, insurance providers and telecommunications companies in Malaysia, Southeast Asia, and beyond.

== History ==
=== 2012 ===
In early 2012, Lee Ching Wei ("Ching"), co-Founder of iMoney quit his investment banking job in Melbourne, gave up an Australian permanent residency permit and returned home to Malaysia.

The idea for iMoney formed as Ching went from bank to bank in attempt to compare and apply for a suitable savings account and credit card. Upon finding the comparison process tedious and full of financial jargon, Ching decided to pursue the idea of launching a platform that will help consumers like himself compare and apply for personal financial products.

By June 2012, iMoney.my was established with investments from angel investors.

=== 2013 ===
Exactly a year later, iMoney received US$500,000 in seed funding from Asia Venture Group. Later, they received a US$140,000 (RM500,000) grant from Cradle Fund — an agency under the Malaysian Ministry of Finance, and US$2 million from a group of venture capital funds including Jungle Ventures and 500 Startups. In November 2013, iMoney.my entered into a regional collaboration with financial literacy provider MoneyTree.

=== 2014 ===
In June 2014, iMoney.my released a home loan calculator mobile application to help consumers apply for home loans directly from the app. In October 2014, iMoney.my announced a US$4 million investment from ASX listed entity iSelect Ltd.

=== 2015 ===
In September 2015, iMoney's Co-Founder and Chief Revenue Officer (CRO) Bruno Araujo stepped up as Chief Operations Officer (COO). In addition to that, Mitul Lakhani was brought in as CFO and Amanda Woo took on the CMO post. Chris Antonius joined the team as Managing Director for iMoney's Indonesian property Aturduit.

=== 2017 ===
In October, iSelect, a financial comparison company listed on the Australian Securities Exchange, announced that it has acquired a majority stake of iMoney.

In the same year, iMoney launched iMoney CreditScore in Malaysia to allow people to check their credit score online for free – one of the first companies to do so. This facility is powered by Experian (formerly known as RAM Credit Information), a credit bureau agency.

=== 2018 ===
Mitul Lakhani stepped up as the Group CEO, while Ching, the Founder of iMoney took up the Chief Innovation Officer post.

=== 2020 ===
iSelect, iMoney's largest shareholder, announced that it will be exiting the company. Citing the financial impact of COVID-19, iSelect sold its stake to one of the iMoney founders.

By the end of August, JurisTech, a Malaysian-based fintech company, announced that it has acquired iMoney for an undisclosed sum. Commenting on the acquisition, Ching said, "With the technology capabilities of JurisTech, we can now provide a better experience to consumers including more refined product matching capabilities and improve customer journey to make applying financial products easier”.

== Locations ==
The company is headquartered in Bangsar South, Kuala Lumpur, in the same venue as its parent company, JurisTech.
