= ÆON Bukit Indah Shopping Centre =

Shopping mall in Johor Bahru, Johor, Malaysia

AEON Bukit Indah Shopping Centre
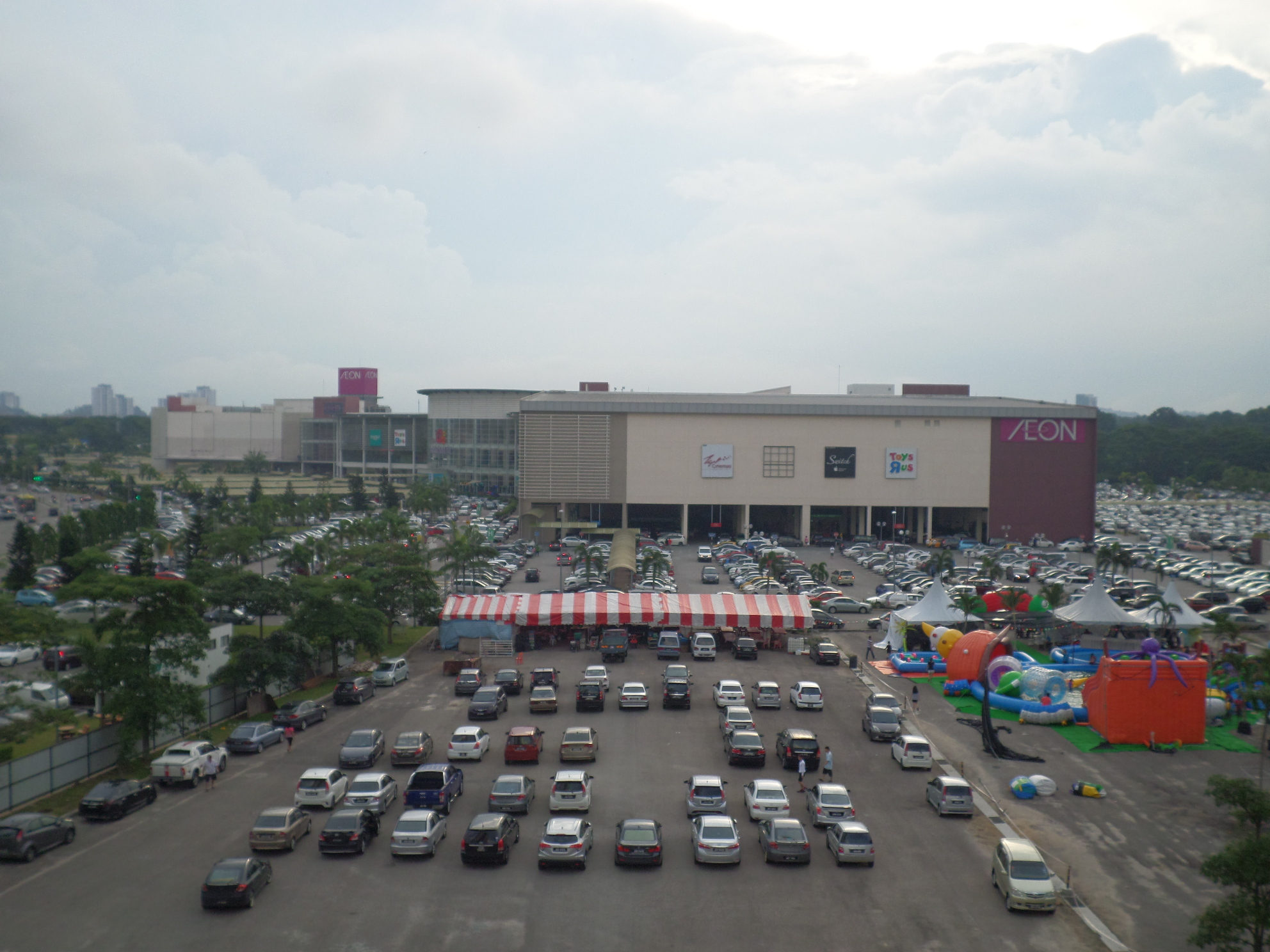
- Coordinates: 1°28′53.3″N 103°39′20.9″E
- Address: Bukit Indah, Iskandar Puteri, Johor, Malaysia
- Opened: 19 December 2008
- Owner: AEON Group
- Floors: 3

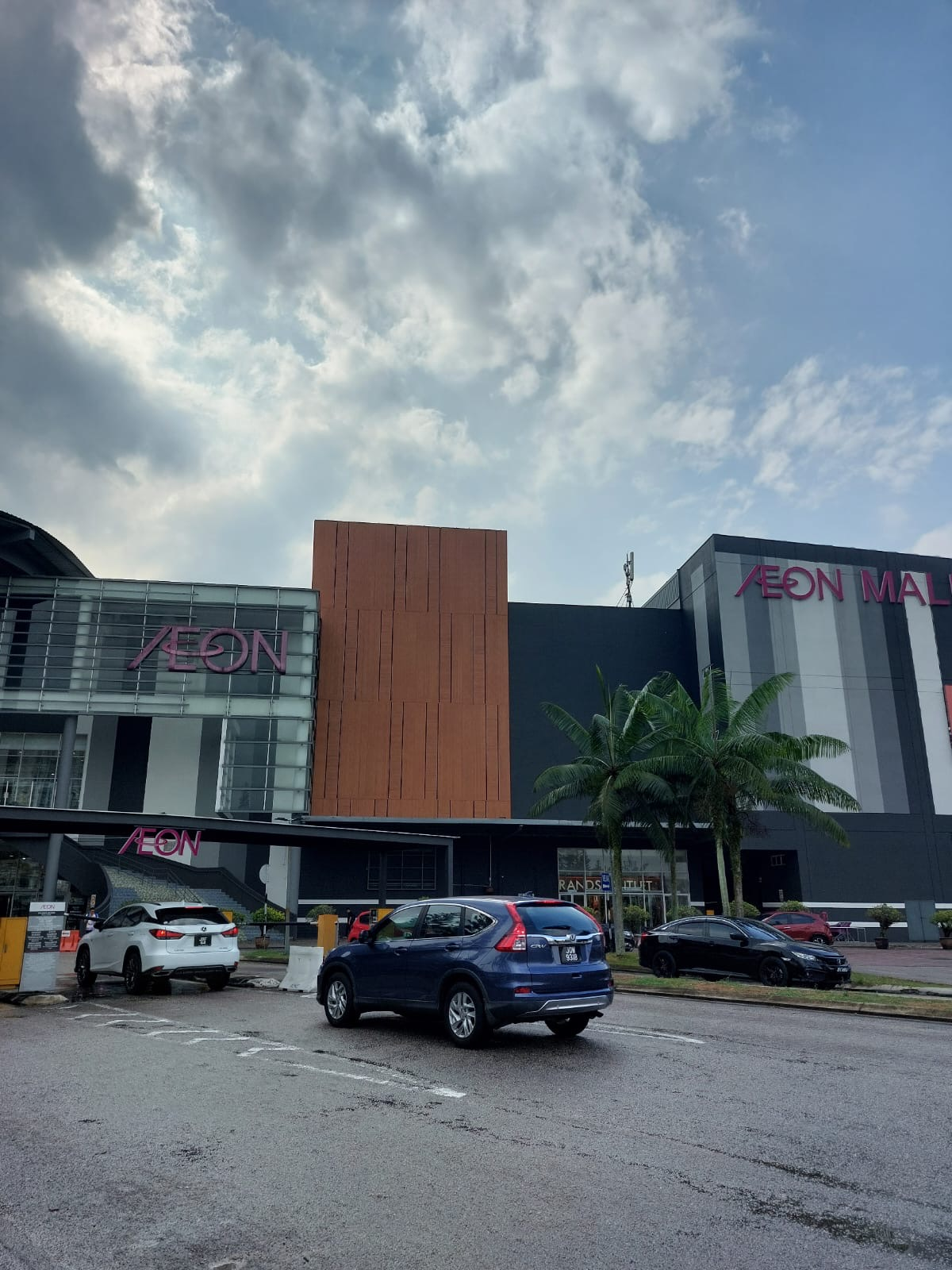
AEON Bukit Indah close shot

AEON Bukit Indah Shopping Centre is a shopping mall in Bukit Indah, Iskandar Puteri, Johor Bahru District, Johor, Malaysia.

== History ==
The construction of the mall started in July 2006 and it opened in December 2008. In December 2017, the shopping mall experienced a blackout for several days.

== Transportation ==
The shopping mall is accessible by bus from Johor Bahru Sentral railway station (111, 221) in Johor Bahru.

== See also ==
- List of shopping malls in Malaysia
