= Penang Indian Heritage Museum =

- Muzium Warisan Kaum India Pulau Pinang இந்திய பாரம்பரிய அருங்காட்சியகம் பினாங்கு
- Established: 1st May 2018
- Location: George Town, Penang
- Coordinates: 5°25′16″N 100°18′15″E
- Type: museum
- Owner: Penang Hindu Endowments Board
- Public transit access: Rapid Penang (102 from Penang International Airport, 103 & 104 from Komtar)

The Penang Indian Heritage Museum (Malay: Muzium Warisan Kaum India Penang) is a museum in George Town, Penang, Malaysia. The museum is about the history of Indian community in Penang. The museum features more than 2,000 artefacts related to Malaysian Indian that have been preserved since the 1930s.

== Opening time ==
The museum opens every Wednesday to Sunday from 10am to 4pm. Monday, Tuesday and Public Holiday Closed.

== Location ==
The museum housed at the Penang Hindu Endowments Board office Complex at Jalan Macalister in Penang.

== See also ==
- List of museums in Malaysia
