= Penang Hindu Endowments Board =

- Lembaga Wakaf Hindu Pulau Pinang பினாங்கு இந்து அறநிலைய வாரியம்
- Government of Penang

State government overview
- Formed: 1 January 1906; 119 years ago
- Headquarters: Level 30, KOMTAR, 10000 Pulau Pinang.
- State government executive: YB Tuan RSN Rayer, Director
- Parent State government: Kerajaan Negeri Pulau Pinang
- Website: hebpenang.gov.my

The Penang Hindu Endowments Board (Tamil script: பினாங்கு இந்து அறநிலைய வாரியம்; abbreviation: PHEB) is an agency of the Penang State government in Malaysia that administers Hindu religious affairs in the state.

== Background ==
The PHEB's administration is under the Penang State Government but its annual report and financial statements will be presented to the Cabinet and Parliament by the Minister of National Unity (Malaysia). Now, the PHEB is led by its director, RSN Rayer. The PHEB is a statutory body as stated in the Hindu Endowments Act in 1906.
