= Komtar =

Skyscraper in George Town, Penang, Malaysia

Tun Abdul Razak Complex
- Kompleks Tun Abdul Razak
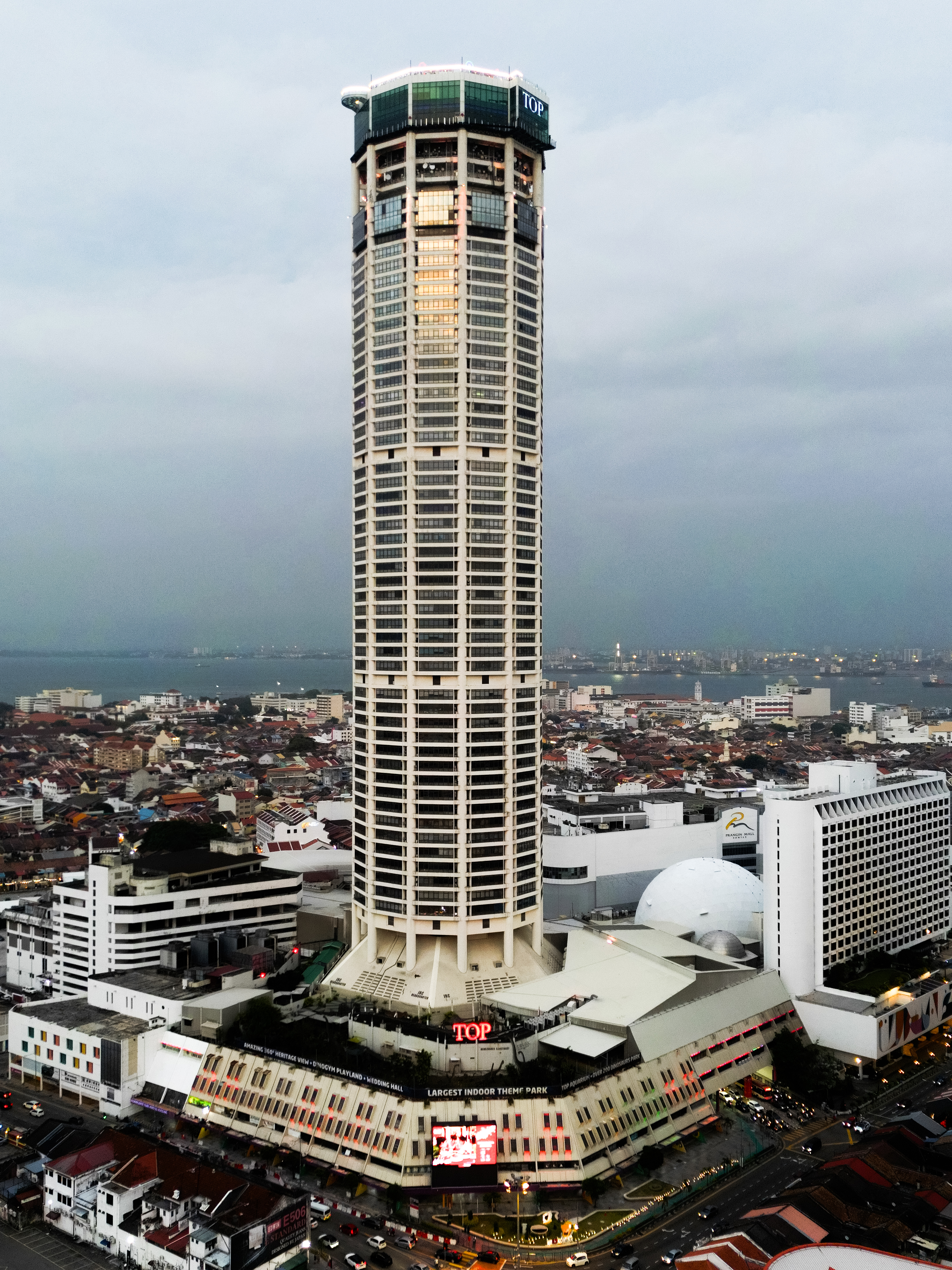
- KOMTAR Tower in 2024

Record height
- Tallest in Southeast Asia from 1 January 1985 to 10 November 1986^{[I]}
- Preceded by: 6 Shenton Way
- Surpassed by: One Raffles Place

General information
- Architectural style: Modernism
- Location: Penang Road, George Town, Penang, Malaysia.
- Coordinates: 5.4145°N 100.3292°E
- Groundbreaking: 1 January 1974
- Construction started: Phase 1: 1 January 1974; Phase 2: January 1983; Phase 3: October 2007; Phase 4: 1996; Phase 5: 2017
- Topped-out: Tower: 1 January 1985
- Completed: Phase 1: October 1976; Phase 2: November 1985; Phase 3: June 2010; Phase 4: 2000; Phase 5: 2019
- Opening: Phase 1: 2 December 1976; Phase 2: 2 April 1986; Phase 3: 25 November 2010; Phase 4: 2001; Phase 5: 9 November 2019
- Inaugurated: 1 January 1977; 49 years ago
- Cost: RM808.6 million (Note: The cost of each phase is listed as such: Phase 1 and 2: RM279.5 million (1990); Phase 3: RM300 million (2007); Phase 4: RM200 million (1996); Phase 5: RM29.1 million (2023))
- Owner: Penang state government
Other information
Height
Architectural	248.7 metres (816 ft) (Note: Previously 231.7 metres (760 ft) from 1985 to 2016.)
Technical details
Floor count	Tower: 68 floors (Note: Previously 65 storeys from 1985 to 2016.); Phase 2: 17 floors; Phase 3: 6 floors; Phase 4: 10 floors
Floor area	Tower: 640,000 sq ft (59,000 m^{2}); Phase 1: 460,000 sq ft (43,000 m^{2}); Phase 2: 2,000,000 sq ft (190,000 m^{2}); Phase 3: 1,500,000 sq ft (140,000 m^{2}); Phase 4: 430,000 sq ft (40,000 m^{2})
Lifts/elevators	Tower: 26

Design and construction
- Architects: Lim Chong Keat; Architects Team 3
- Developer: Penang Development Corporation
- Structural engineer: Ove Arup & Partners

References
- I.

The Tun Abdul Razak Complex (abbrev. Komtar) is a civic complex of five buildings within the central business district of George Town, Penang. It first opened on 2 December 1976. At the time of its completion in 1985, the central skyscraper of the complex, Komtar Tower, at 231.7 metres (760 ft), was the tallest skyscraper in Southeast Asia. The complex contains 1,420,000 square feet (132,000 m^{2}) of office and retail space on a 27-acre (11 ha) superblock. It is a major bus terminal for Rapid Penang, and the seat of the Penang state government and the chief minister of Penang.

The modernist complex was built between 1974 and 1986 at an initial cost of RM279.5 million (equivalent to RM642.5 million in 2023). The complex was proposed by chief minister Lim Chong Eu in 1969, while his brother Chong Keat designed the complex. It was planned to be built in five phases, although only two were completed in their original form. The remaining three phases were repurposed as Prangin Mall, 1st Avenue, and the Sia Boey Urban Archaeological Park and were built between 1996 and 2019. Renovations in 2015 extended the height of Komtar Tower to 248.7 metres (816 ft).

Described as a "city within a city", the design of the complex was radical and utopian for its time, and was the largest urban regeneration project in Malaysian history. However, it ultimately failed to achieve its objective of rejuvenating George Town's city centre. The construction of the complex was also criticised for demolishing a portion of the city's heritage quarters which displaced thousands of residents. Starting from the late-1990s, the complex was neglected due to insufficient maintenance. Despite these circumstances, Komtar is Penang's most famous landmark and is seen as a symbol of the state's post-industrialisation prosperity.

== Background ==
=== Site ===
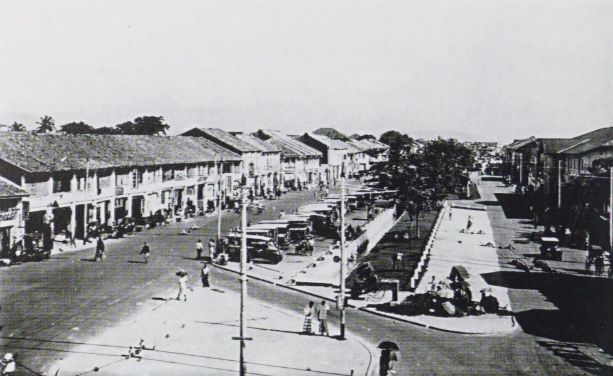
Maxwell and Penang Roads, c.1930s.

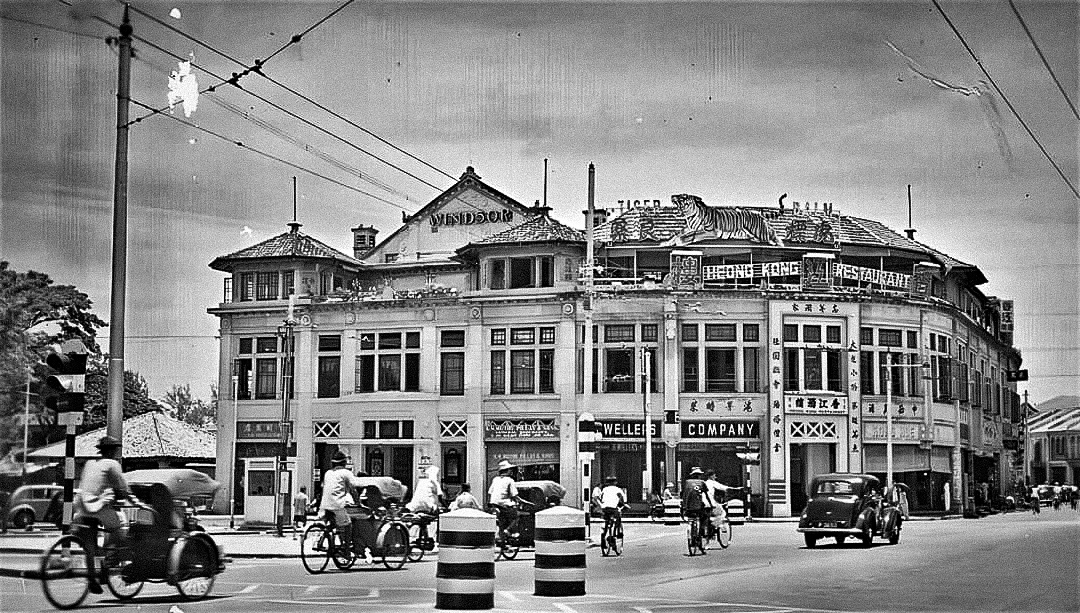
Windsor Building and Capitol Theatre, c.1937.

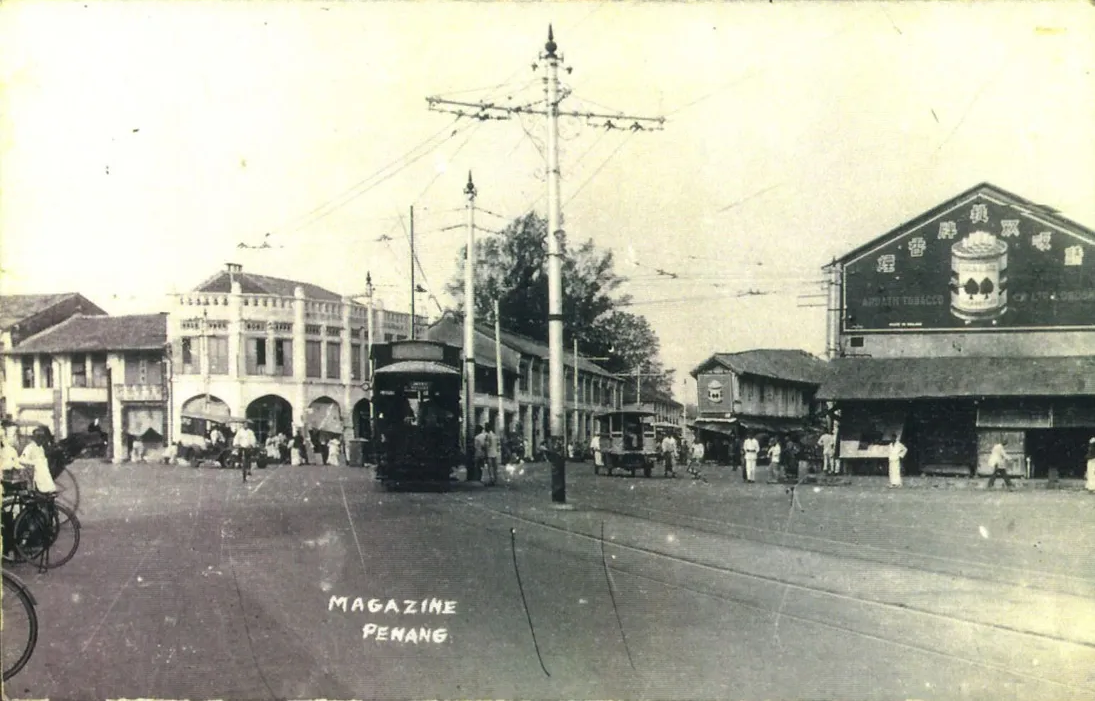
Magazine Circus, facing Gladstone Road, c.1930s.

The site Komtar now occupies was a stretch of the Prangin River, which ran through a swamp. In 1804, the construction of the Prangin Canal began under directions from the British East India Company. The canal was built for agricultural and commercial uses, and marked the furthest boundaries of George Town at the time. Due to its location, the Malays referred to it as Ujong Pasir, while the Chinese called it Sia Boey, both carrying the same meaning of the "end of the village". In 1806, a marketplace was set up at Sia Boey, which evolved into the Sia Boey Market. Since the 1880s, the market centered around an iron market hall, which operated until 2004.

Adjacent to Sia Boey was Magazine Circus, a roundabout converging on a junction of six major roads. The Malays named it Simpang Enam ("the six-way junction"), while the Chinese called it Go Pha Teng ("the five lamps"), referencing street lamps set up at the junction. In 1928, the first traffic lights in Penang were set up at the roundabout. Sia Boey was severely bombed during Japanese raids during the start of the Malayan campaign, killing hundreds.

Map of the Prangin Canal and its surrounding areas, c. 1960.

=== Creation of Komtar ===
George Town was established as a free port in 1786 and served as a major entrepôt in British Malaya, trading spices and tin. It was also the first port of call east of the Indian subcontinent. After Malayan independence, the federal government shifted commercial and trading activities to Kuala Lumpur, intending to focus on the development of Port Klang. In 1966, federal amendments to customs made the free port status redundant, and in 1969 the status was formally revoked. These policy changes led to massive unemployment and brain drain within the city, creating a period of recession and urban decay in Penang throughout the 1960s.

Amidst rising discontent, during the 1969 general elections, the ruling Alliance Party led by chief minister Wong Pow Nee was voted out in Penang and replaced by the opposition Malaysian People's Movement Party (Gerakan), with Lim Chong Eu sworn in as chief minister. To address these challenges, Lim established the Penang Development Corporation (PDC) in November 1969 as a development arm of the state government.

As early as 1962, the Penang state government proposed to develop a hawker centre in an area around Prangin Road. Malayan architecture firm Malayan Architects Co-Partnership was contracted for the project, but it stalled within months. PDC designated four sites within George Town in late-1969 as "comprehensive development areas" for urban redevelopment, which included the construction of low-cost flats on reclaimed land and urban renewal programmes. It then created a "central area planning unit" (CAPU) for monitoring residential and highway infrastructural projects in the city, which redesignated the 1962 hawker centre proposal into a civic centre known as the Central Area Redevelopment Plan, the precursor project of Komtar.

== History ==
=== Design ===
Lim Chong Eu, chief minister of Penang (1969–1990).

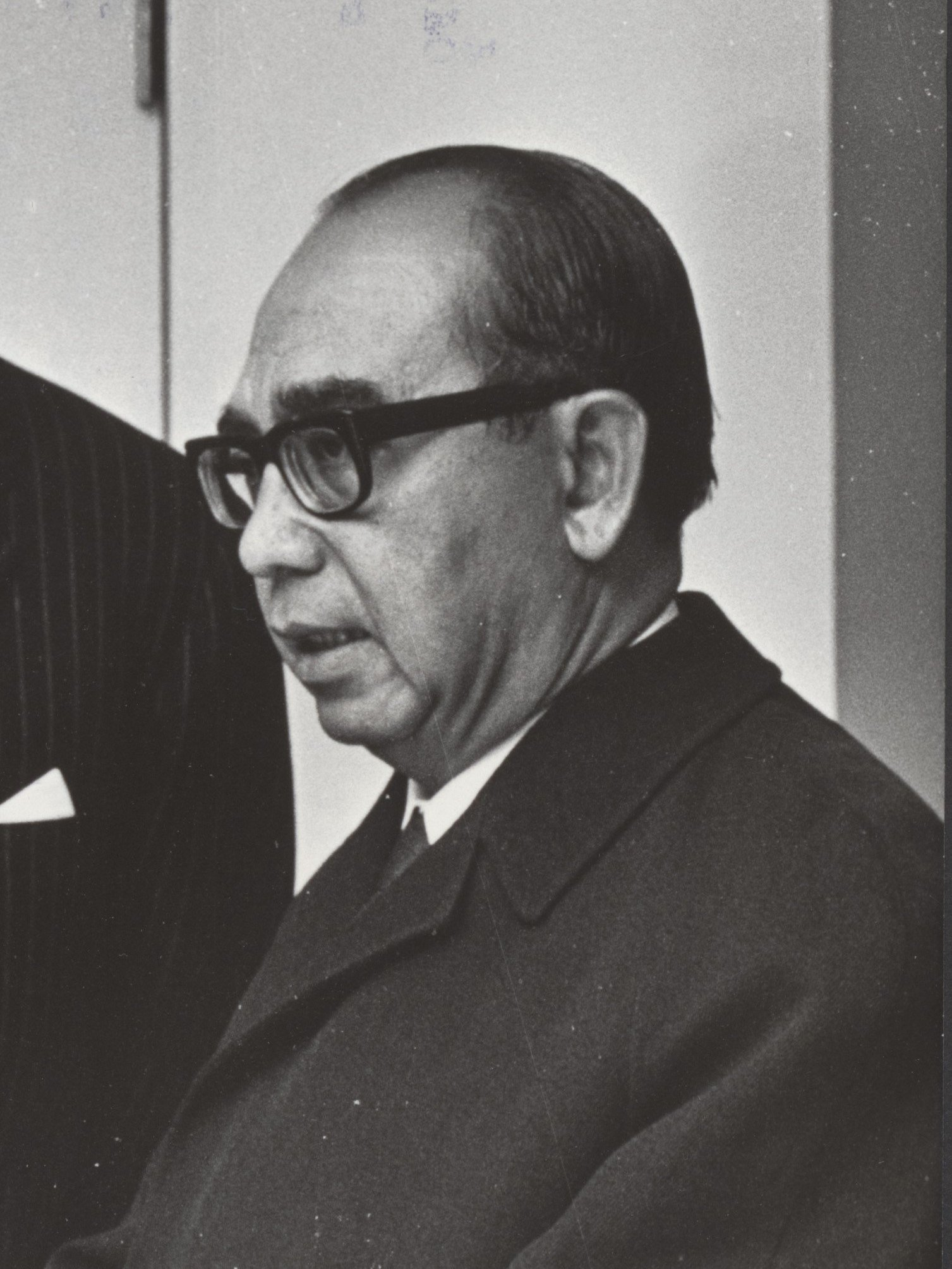
Abdul Razak Hussein, prime minister of Malaysia (1970–1976).

Komtar was conceived to be a step in 1970s "progressive" urban planning of the Penang state government. It was expected to ease congestion and remove urban slums from George Town's city centre which appeared after the 1960s recession.

According to Lim Chong Eu, the complex was a "sign of collaboration" between the federal government and Penang. It was given priority in the New Economic Policy championed under the administration of Abdul Razak Hussein, who said that this project "will change the outlook of George Town from a colonial heritage to a city reflecting a Malaysian society".

Plans for a civic centre in central George Town were announced publicly as early as 18 November 1970 as the Penang Urban Centre. The state government selected Singaporean architectural firm Architects Team Three (AT3) for the CAPU, with Lim Chong Eu's brother Chong Keat as its lead architect. Ove Arup was selected as the civil and structural engineer.

Although Lim Chong Keat established his reputation in Singapore through the Jurong Town Hall and the DBS Building, the selection was accused of being nepotistic. Consultation fees for all development firms in the CAPU including AT3 amounted to RM4.8 million in 1974, a figure disputed by opposition politicians who alleged that RM10 million was paid to AT3 alone. Throughout 1971, the CAPU conducted extensive planning studies for the project. A report dated August 1972 noted that the project should be located on a 22.4 acres (9.1 ha) site bounded by Penang Road, Prangin Road, Magazine Road and Beach Street, with parking for 3,000 vehicles. Academics from the University of Penang and a traffic consultant provided additional input for the project.

Lim Chong Keat designed the entire complex in five phases, where the main structure occupies the first two. Location-wise, it was designed to link with a then-proposed coastal highway system that leads southwards to a cross-strait linkage and the Penang International Airport. Construction of the first phase was projected to raise the total revenue in the region from RM114,000 in 1974 to RM3 million in 1984, which was planned as funds for maintenance and upkeep for the complex's amenities.

==== Phase one ====
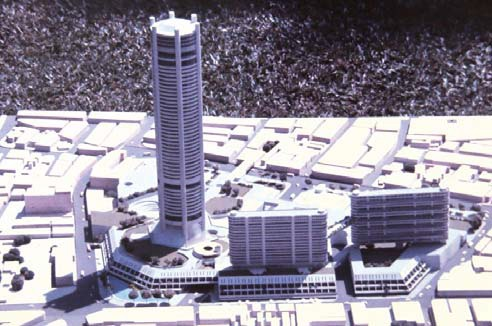
Komtar architectural model, 1969–1970.

An artist's depiction of Komtar's design in 1975 (left), and in 1986 (right).

Phase one involves the construction of a four-storey podium, a geodesic dome, and a 60-storey central skyscraper covering an area of 301,000 square feet (28,000 m^{2}).

The complex's podium was designed to rejuvenate George Town's declining inner-city economy with a Western-style shopping mall for middle-class residents from the city's outer suburbs. The shopping mall contained 460,000 square feet (43,000 m^{2}) of retail space. Elsewhere, the podium houses a bus terminal, a public theater, a national archives, a police and fire station, and a rooftop indoor orchid garden with a reflective pool. A hotel for travelers was planned at the third floor. Six pairs of escalators are installed in the podium.

The geodesic dome, influenced by the designs of Buckminster Fuller, a special consultant of the CAPU, is positioned above the podium directly adjacent to the reflective pool. The dome is 48 metres (157 ft) in diameter, and contains a multipurpose hall with 1,875 seats. It was designed as a column-free structure made from aluminum prefabricated from computer designs. The interior of the dome is covered with K-13 spray foam for better indoor acoustics.

Initial plans for the skyscraper involved a 12-sided cylinder column 45 or 47 stories tall in two stages. It contained 640,000 square feet (59,000 m^{2}) of office space. The foundations of the skyscraper are designed to support 60 storeys for potential extensions, which became the actual height reported in promotional materials as early as 1975. Thirty-two high speed lifts are fitted in the complex, including 24 in the skyscraper, each capable of travelling at 1,200 feet (370 m) per minute.

==== Phase two ====
Phase two involves the extension of phase one's retail podium with 2,000,000 square feet (190,000 m^{2}) of retail space and several civic amenities. To accommodate the displaced residents from the construction site, three 17-storey apartment blocks were allocated for the two phases. The first block, with 194 flats, is designed as a "controlled social programme" planned and sold for selected families of mixed races. In total, the three apartment blocks can house 800 households, with an emphasis on accommodating lower-income groups. These communities would link to a clubhouse, a library, communal swimming pools, and several cafes, where access corridors between them are thought of as "streets". All three residential blocks are connected with enclosed bridges on the ninth floor.

=== Preparations ===
In 1972, PDC began preparations for phase one. The City Council and state government owned 182,516 square feet (16,956.3 m^{2}) of land for its construction. Between 1972 and 1973, the state government acquired the necessary land available, predominantly from inherited landlords of the Straits Chinese elite. The total cost of land and property acquisitions was estimated at RM26.2 million in 1977 (RM100.6 million in 2023 value).

Demolition works at acquired sites involved 769 houses, 304 shops, 14 factories, four cinemas, three schools, a vehicles' office, a post station and a fire station. The process evicted 3,175 residents to the city's outer suburbs, including Jelutong, Bayan Baru and the PDC-funded Macallum Street Ghaut. The Magazine Circus and most of Gladstone Road was removed. By 1973, the state government projected the total cost of the entire complex at RM200 million (RM1.04 billion in 2023 value); phase one at RM77.6 million, with RM40.8 million allocated for the skyscraper. The call of tender for the project's construction concluded in December 1973.

=== Construction ===
Komtar is supported by a three-metre thick reinforced concrete raft foundation, with 860 composite piles up to 54 metres (177 ft) deep. These enabled the complex to be resistant to tremors up to four on the Modified Mercalli scale. Piling works of the complex concluded at the end of 1973. Construction of the complex began on 1 January 1974 in a ceremony officiated by Abdul Razak Hussein. It took place on a 0.4 hectares (1 acre) site, which involves 70 units of retail and office space, where 34 per cent of the total area was reserved to bumiputeras. A two-week exhibition regarding the urban scheme was held near the construction site from 10 to 24 January 1974. In May 1974, work progressed to the skyscraper.

Construction of phase one was carried out in four stages (phases 1A–D). Phase 1A, the four-storey retail podium, was planned to be completed by October 1976. It received a soft opening on 2 December 1976. Piling works for phase 1B, an extension of the podium and the central skyscraper began in November 1975. It was initially expected that the next three stages would be completed by September 1978, 1979, and 1980 respectively, with the skyscraper topping out in 1981. However, the complex suffered repeated delays, with phase 1B delayed to July 1979 and again to June 1980. Starting from late-1975, hampered by delays, building costs inflated dramatically, with costs rising almost 15 per cent annually as delays progressed. The initial budget for phase one had risen to RM136.2 million by May 1975, and to RM151.8 million by September 1979. Similarly, construction of the central skyscraper was delayed, as stage one (up to the 29th storey) was scheduled for completion by September 1981, and stage two (29th–47th storey) by February 1983.

Fire engulfed the upper half of the skyscraper in January 1983.

In January 1983, construction moved to phase two. It was carried out in five stages (phases 2A–E), including an electric substation (phase 2A), a department complex (phase 2B), an 11-storey car park with 750 parking spaces (phase 2C), a geodesic dome (phase 2D) and an 11-acre (480,000 sq ft) rooftop garden above the podium (phase 2E). (Note: Not to be confused with a nearby plot of land at the junction between Prangin Road and Penang Road which is also designated as phase 2E.) The total cost of the second phase was estimated at RM110 million in 1983. A further RM7 million was allocated for the geodesic dome. However, work was abruptly halted when a major fire broke out on the tower between 23 and 24 January, which gutted the 41st to 47th floors. The fire was reportedly visible across the Penang Strait at Perai, and required the mobilisation of fire fighting units as far as Nibong Tebal. Later investigations determined that the fire was likely started by welding sparks.

Construction resumed by mid-1983, reaching the 60th floor by 1984. The skyscraper structurally topped out at the 65th floor on 1 January 1985. In May 1985, plans for the apartment blocks were scrapped and replaced with a single hotel building. The hotel opened as the Shangri-La Inn in 1986. The main framework for the geodesic dome was completed and inaugurated in July by Tunku Abdul Rahman. In mid-1990, a pedestrian mall was constructed as the final adjoining part of phase two, occupying half of Maxwell Road and the Prangin Canal, forcing the remnants of the adjacent Prangin Road to merge into a one road. By 1990, the total cost reached RM279.5 million (RM642.5 million in 2023 value).

Floor layout of the skyscraper.

=== Expansion ===
Plans for phases 2E, three, four, and five were first proposed in 1990–1991. These projects would remain in development until the 2010s as 1st Avenue Mall, Prangin Mall, and the Sia Boey Urban Archaeological Park.

==== Phase 2E ====
An artist's depiction of Metro Plaza (left) and the Capitol Theatre before its demolition, c. 1992 (right).

In 1989, a parcel of land situated at the junction of Prangin Road and Penang Road, designated phase 2E, was put up for sale. In 1991, Malaysian retail chain Metrojaya submitted plans for Metro Plaza, a six-storey department complex for phase 2E. The complex was to cost RM47 million with 340,000 square feet (32,000 m^{2}) of retail space. Metrojaya would acquire necessary parcels of land throughout 1991.

In early-1992, the project was scaled down to a five-storey department complex with 312,000 square feet (29,000 m^{2}) of built-up area, 240 parking spaces and 650 staff. Preparation of Metro Plaza began in 1992 with the demolition of the Capitol Theatre and ten other businesses which sat at the site, while construction was projected to complete within three years. The site remained dormant by 1995 and it was only in 1996 that talks of construction resumed. However, it was cancelled after the Asian financial crisis in late-1997.

==== Phase three ====
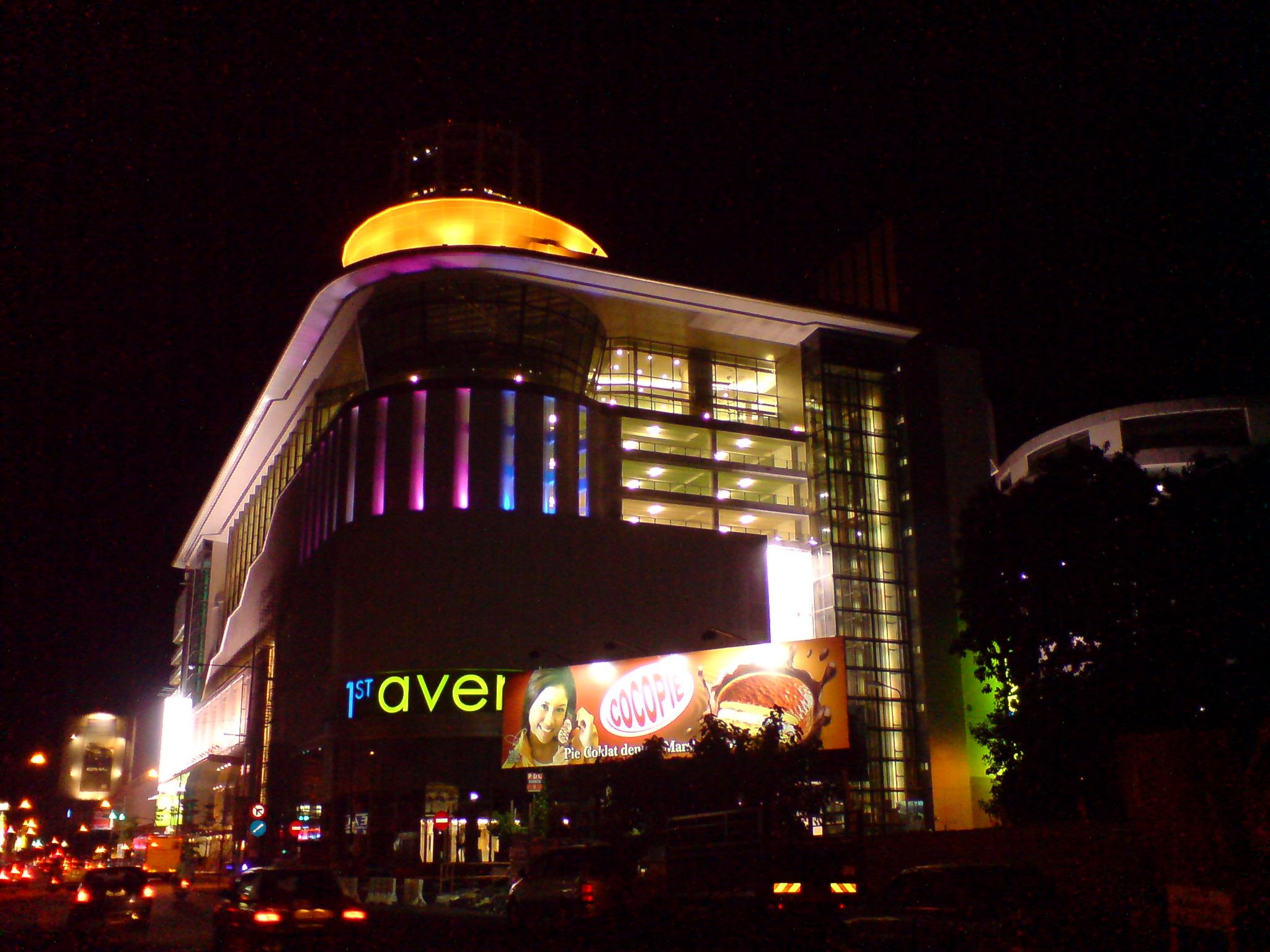
1st Avenue Mall at night, 2010.

Phase three was a nine-storey RM129 million department complex proposed by Japanese retail group Yaohan, which was to be completed by 1993. The project sat on an 84,000 square feet (7,800 m^{2}) plot of land running largely parallel to the Prangin Canal and was to be built by Kumagai Gumi. In 1992, citing its inability to allow majority local participation of the project as required, Yaohan rescinded the 1990 agreement, which led to a private takeover by Lion Group. Demolition works for the site began in 1992 with twelve shophouses, with the empty land becoming parking space until December 1996.

In November 1996, the state government issued a construction ban of all structures beyond five storeys within the city-centre, threatening phase three's cancellation. An updated proposal submitted in 1997 featured a RM170 million 10-storey shopping complex named Mutiara Parade. Construction was scheduled for late-1996 and expected to finish in 1999. However, all construction was suspended in February 1997 due to concerns of unstable soil influenced by flaws in foundational works for Prangin Mall nearby. Construction never resumed and was cancelled amidst the Asian financial crisis in late-1997.

The cancellation of Mutiara Parade suspended any construction at the site until October 2007, when construction began on 1st Avenue, an 11-storey 430,000 square feet (40,000 m^{2}) shopping mall. The development, costing RM300 million, was modeled after Raffles City Singapore. Construction was completed in June 2010 and inaugurated on 25 November 2010.

==== Phase four ====
Phase four was originally designed as an extension of Komtar's pedestrian mall, stretching 100 metres (330 ft) along Prangin Road, beyond Carnavon Street, while covering remnants of Maxwell Road. In 1990, 155 traders along Prangin Road were relocated to within Komtar and Chowrasta Market in preparation for phase four. However, the extension was replaced with Prangin Mall, a 1,500,000 square feet (140,000 m^{2}) shopping complex at a cost of RM200 million. The complex contained 73 escalators, two "bubble" lifts, an international food centre, six Parisian cafés, a garden mall, and four cinemas with a total of 1,800 seats. Excavation works for Prangin Mall began in 1996. During piling works, ground subsidence was sighted at the site, leading to cracks appearing on over a hundred houses nearby. Komtar reported similar occurrences, even though officials denied the complex was in danger. In January 1997, nearby residents filed a police report on this issue, leading to investigations by the Malaysian Public Works Institute (Ikram). They concluded that the structure's foundations were flawed, causing underground water to migrate away from the construction site, leading to subsidence.

As a response, the Penang state government requested a geotechnical report from Prangin Mall's developers, although it did not reach state officials until February 1997. On 30 January, citing the developers' failure of compliance, Ikram issued a stop work order on Prangin Mall. The order was expanded to phase three, noting similar circumstances. At its worst, three hundred houses were affected, while the incident has since been described as a "crisis" or a "disaster".

In March 1997, the developers submitted three mitigation measures to the state government. Mitigation works began in April and lasted for 53 days, costing the developers RM6 million. After mitigation works were complete, the state government lifted the stop work order for Prangin Mall in June under a 20-point agreement. Construction was finally complete in mid-2000 and opened in 2001.

==== Phase five ====
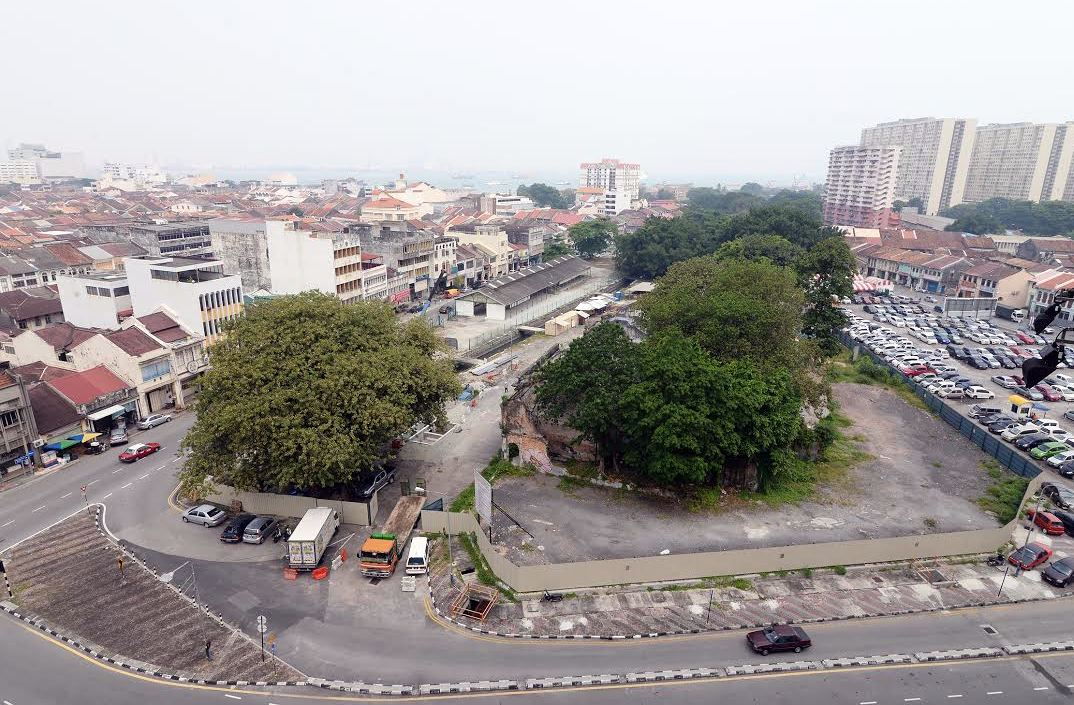
Sia Boey c. 2017. The land remained vacant until it was redeveloped into an urban park in 2019.

Phase five, which occupied Sia Boey Market, was planned in 1991 as a mixed retail, office, and residential development. The land was sold in July 1991 for RM31 million to a private developer for potential development scheduled for 1995 or 1996, but stalled.

In 2002, phase five was planned as an interchange terminal of the Bayan Lepas line, a proposed light rail transit line running along Penang Island. In anticipation of future construction, Sia Boey Market closed in 2004, even though the site remained abandoned for years, due to uncertainties in the light rail transit project.

In 2012, a proposal intended to rebrand phase five into an arts district known as the "Penang Heritage Square". It featured the construction of a five-storey cultural centre with complete restoration of heritage shophouses nearby. This project was however unsuccessful, being relocated to Macallum Street Ghaut in 2016 due to a revival of the Bayan Lepas line. Eventually, a 2.53 acres (1.02 ha) park known as the Sia Boey Urban Archaeological Park began construction in 2015 and was completed in 2019, costing RM29.1 million. The park, which occupied a disused section of the Prangin Canal, opened for public use on 9 November 2019.

In May 2023, the federal government rebranded the Bayan Lepas line as the Mutiara line, which includes a terminal at Komtar as the receiving end of an elevated rail bridge across the Penang Strait towards Seberang Perai. Construction of the station was originally planned for early-2024, but was delayed to September or October 2024, with an expected completion date of 2030.

=== Decline ===
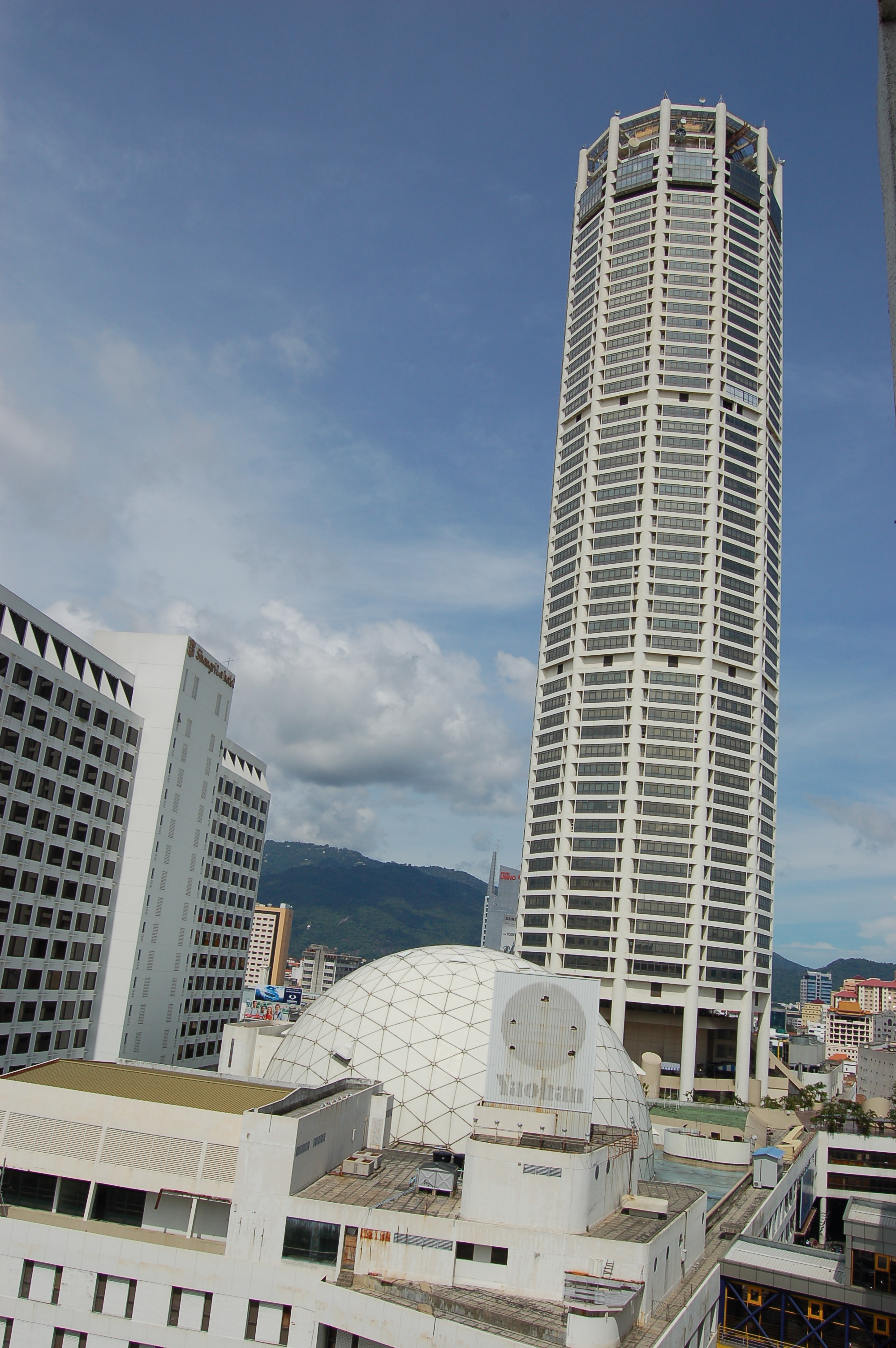
Komtar exterior, 2005.

In the late 1980s to early 1990s, Komtar was the premier retail hub in Penang. A combination of economic decline after the 1997 Asian financial crisis and rising competition from newer and upscale shopping complexes in the outer suburbs such as Gurney Plaza and Penang Times Square caused a significant decline in commercial traffic. The complex was also poorly maintained and disliked by tenants due to its cramped, outdated, and confusing interior layouts.

Attempts of renovation in Komtar were difficult as the state government only owned one-third of all retail units in the complex. The remaining tenants were purchased and owned by private businesses, leading to serious disagreements on rental rates and occupancies. In 2005, the two largest anchor tenants of the complex, Super Komtar and Parkson, ceased operations in rapid succession, decimating foot traffic in the complex. By 2008, 40 per cent of retailers in the complex had closed down.

With reduced local presence, Komtar received an influx of migrant workers, primarily from Nepal, Myanmar, the Philippines, and Indonesia. The atmosphere within the complex drew similarities with Lucky Plaza in Singapore and Victoria Park in Hong Kong. Different floors of the complex housed individually segmented groups of immigrants of different nationalities, functioning as an agora for the diaspora. The complex is also host to homeless vagabonds, drug users, and vandals. Other developments such as Komtar Walk, launched in 2009 as a pedestrian mall, was plagued by legal disputes and was demolished and rebuilt in 2019.

=== Revitalisation ===
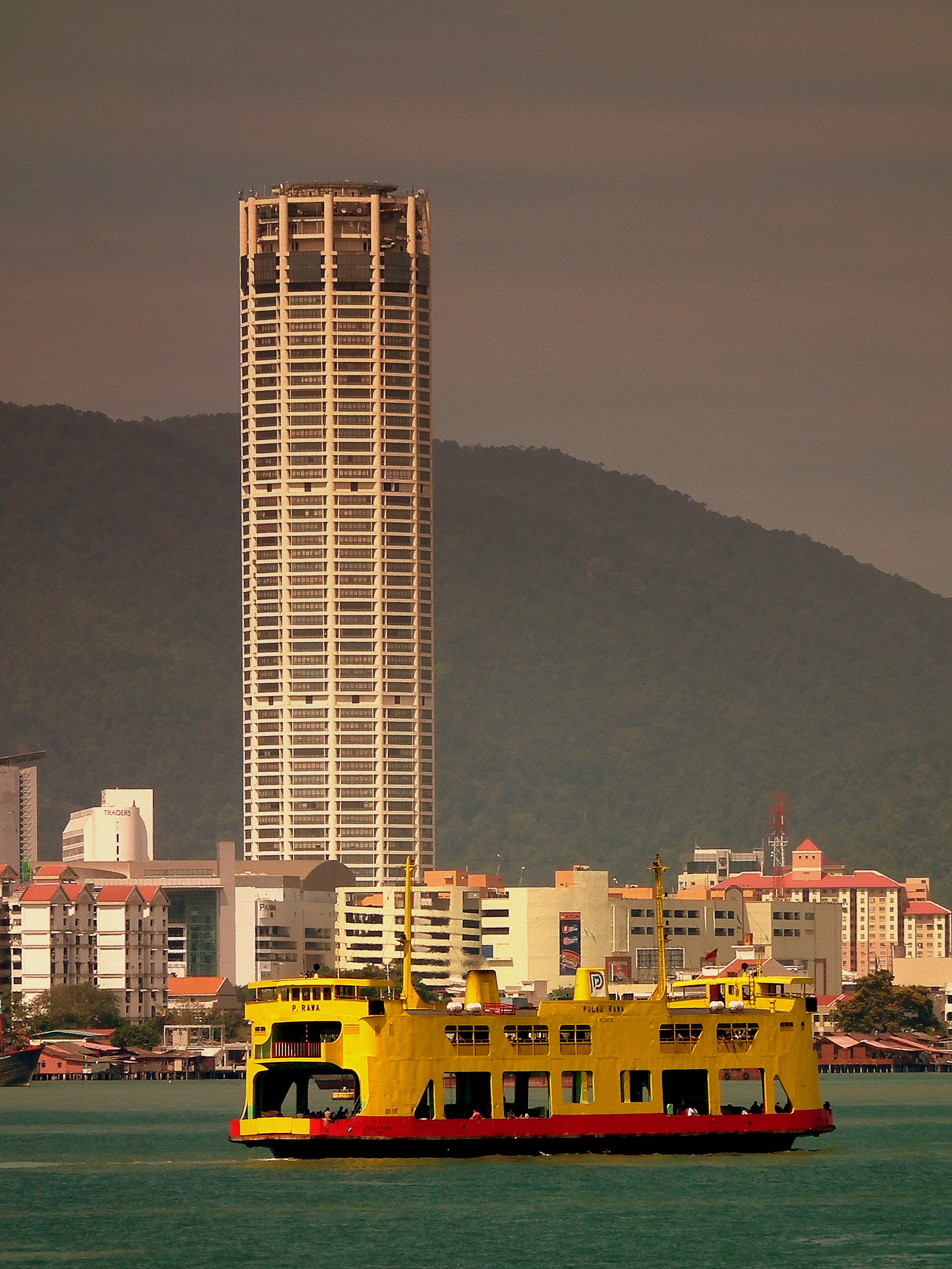
Komtar c. 2012, before redevelopment.

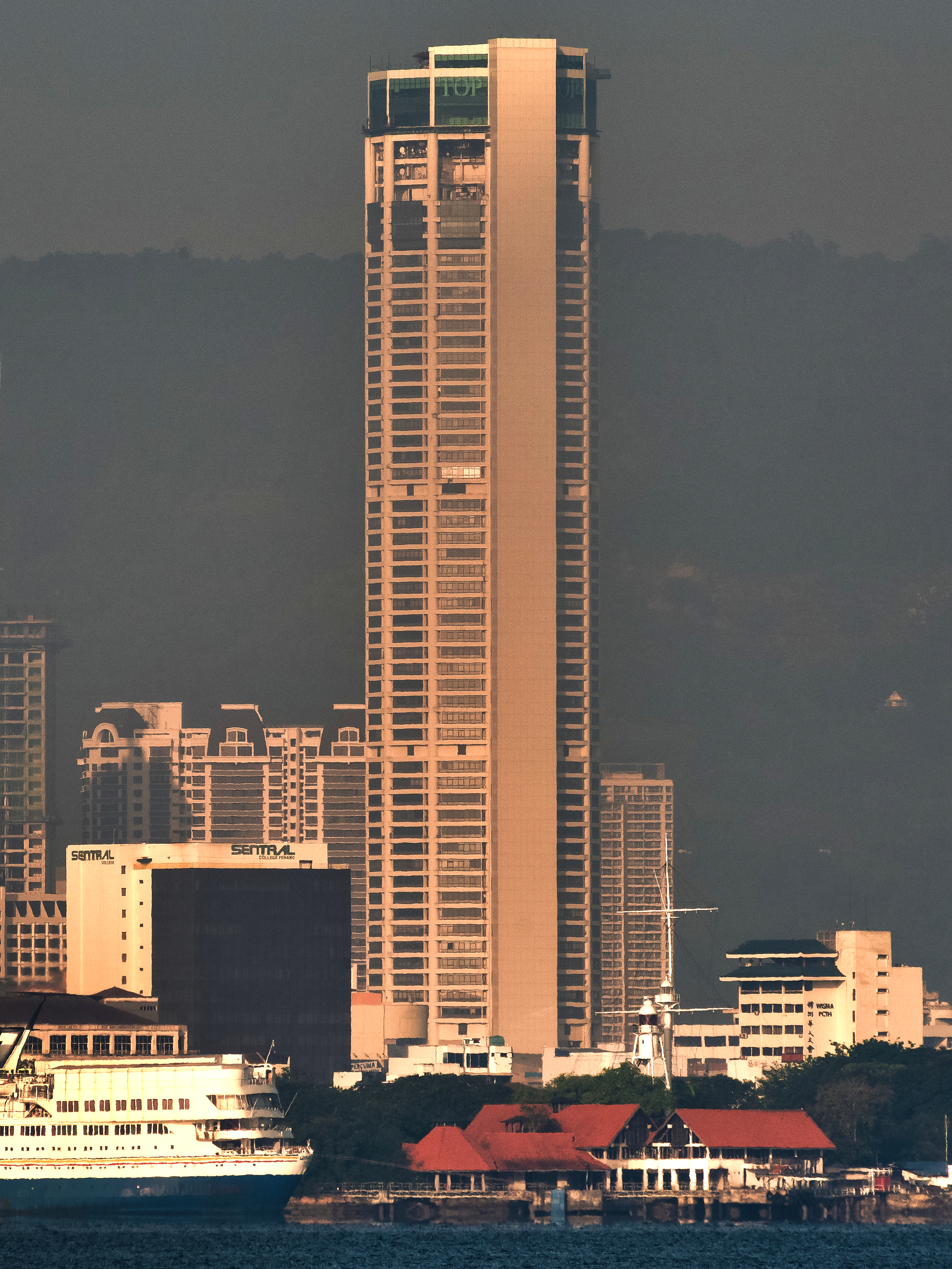
Komtar c. 2017, note the addition on top.

In 2001, the Penang state government initiated a programme to shift all government functions at Komtar to Mini Putrajaya, a new administrative capital at Seberang Perai. It was planned for the complex to convert into a hotel or commercial centre once the relocation was complete. However, the project stalled and was put on hold indefinitely in May 2003, before being canceled in 2008 by Lim Guan Eng due to cost issues. The stalemate over Komtar's redevelopment led to state assemblyman Lim Gim Soon to sarcastically propose in 2007 to convert the complex into a Chinese secondary school.

Several renovations were undertaken during the mid-2000s, including one in October 2007 which cost RM10 million, and an RM15 million renovation project in April 2008 which refurbished the podium. In 2010, the Penang state government launched plans to renovate the upper sections of the skyscraper. The revitalisation effort, known as The Top, was launched in December 2012, costing RM180 million. As part of the effort, three new floors were constructed, increasing the skyscraper's height to 248.9 m (817 ft). A 16-metre (52 ft) skywalk, three bubble lifts, and a 90-metre-long (300 ft) rope course were added in 2018.

== Complex ==
After its completion in late-1985, Komtar stood at 231.7 metres (760 ft) tall, and became the tallest building in Penang, succeeding the Sunrise Tower, and the second-tallest skyscraper in Asia, behind Sunshine 60. It was also the tallest skyscraper in Southeast Asia until 10 November 1986, and in Malaysia until 10 June 1988, when it was surpassed by One Raffles Place and Maybank Tower respectively. With 65 floors, it had the highest floor count of any building in Asia until the completion of the Bank of China Tower in January 1990. Upon its opening, it was advertised as the premier commercial district of George Town. It was among the most popular places of congregation for teenagers in the city in the 1980s. Typically, 5,000 people work in the complex daily, including 1,800 workers from state departments. It was projected that 600,000 to a million visitors visit the skyscraper's observation deck annually.

=== Offices ===
List of tenants in Komtar
Floors		Tenants
68	The Top	Komtar Skywalk
67	The Top	Tower Club Penang
66	The Top	Gym In The Sky
65	The Top	Window of the Top
61–64	High zone	State government of Penang
58–59	High zone	Tower Club Penang
55–57	High zone	State government of Penang
50–54	High zone	State government of Penang
44–49	High zone	State government of Penang
40–43	Mid zone	State government of Penang
35–39	Mid zone	State government of Penang
33–34	Mid zone	State government of Penang
29–32	Mid zone	State government of Penang
25–28	Low zone	State government of Penang
20–24	Low zone	State government of Penang
18–19	Low zone	State government of Penang
15–17	Low zone	Penang Island City Council
10–14	Low zone	Penang Island City Council
7–9	Complex	State government of Penang
6	Complex	Grand Imperial Restaurant
5	Complex	Tunku Hall, Komtar Auditorium
4	Complex	Penang Water Supply Corporation
3	Complex	ICT Digital Mall, State government of Penang
2	Complex	Urban Transformation Centre
1	Complex	Pacific Hypermarket, Maybank, Pos Malaysia

Komtar Tower, which topped out on 1 January 1985, is 248.9 metres (817 ft) tall with 68 storeys. Currently, the skyscraper houses the offices of the Penang state government (level 3, 7–58, and 61–64), the chief minister of Penang (level 28) and the mayor of George Town (level 17). Other office tenants include the Penang Island City Council, Public Services Commission, the Immigration Department of Malaysia, the Malaysian Inland Revenue Board, Tenaga Nasional, Maybank, Pos Malaysia, and the National Higher Education Fund Corporation.

In July 1980, Komtar's first major office sale occurred when the federal government bought 91,000 square feet (8,500 m^{2}) of office space. Between December 1982 and January 1984, the Penang state government spent RM45 million buying 210,600 square feet (19,570 m^{2}) of office space, occupying 17 storeys of the skyscraper.

In 1983, the Penang Municipal Council was forced to move to Komtar by the state government even though its offices at City Hall were sufficient, leading to opposition within the council. This decision, costing RM20 million, relocated the council's offices to 100,000 square feet (9,300 m^{2}) of office space between the 12th and 17th floors. In 1984, chief minister Lim Chong Eu moved his offices into the 28th floor. By February 1985, occupancy reached the 33rd floor. In 1986, the offices of the Penang state government, which had been located at the Tuanku Syed Putra Building since 1962, moved to Komtar permanently. By 1990, RM162.7 million worth of office space were sold.

In July 1992, an indoor golf club, reportedly the first in Malaysia, opened at the 56th floor. In 2008, Telekom Malaysia occupied the 58th floor as a call centre. Similarly, before 2015 the 64th floor had been rented by telecommunication companies to install their equipment. In 2020, nine federal agencies moved into Komtar under the Urban Transformation Centre at the second and third floors, occupying 42,000 square feet (3,900 m^{2}) of office space.

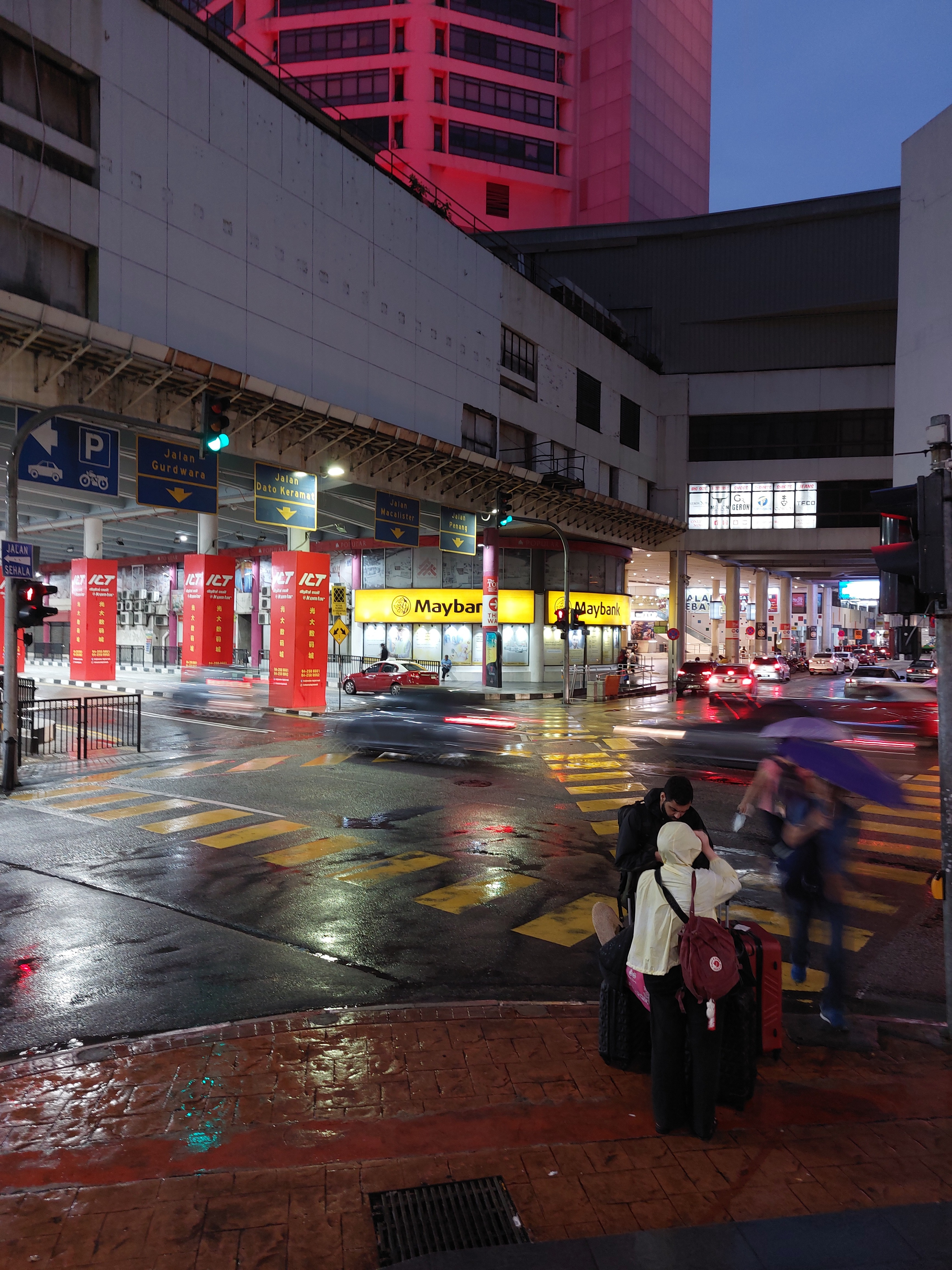
Junction between Komtar bus terminal and Prangin Mall.

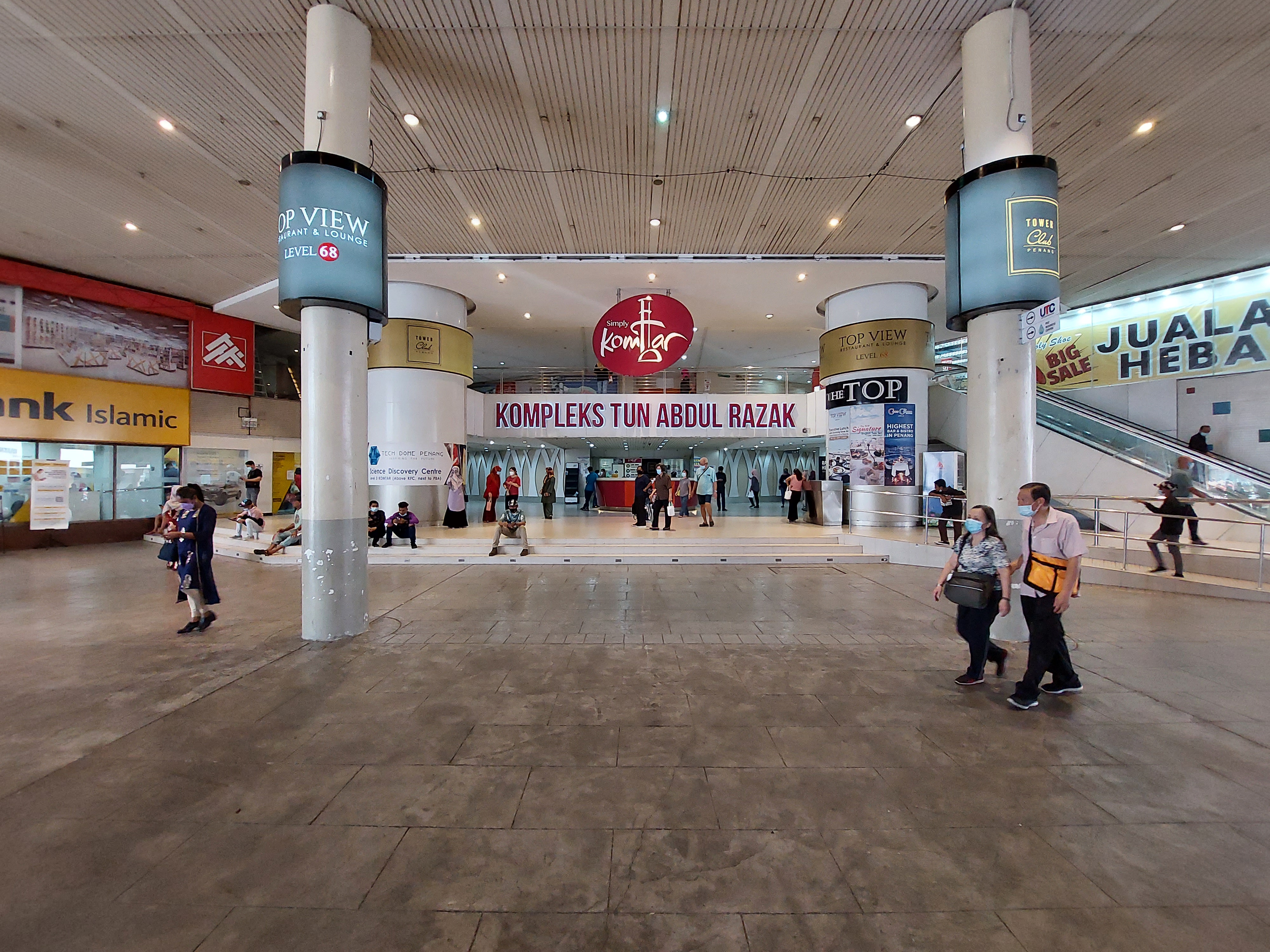
Main entrance of the complex.

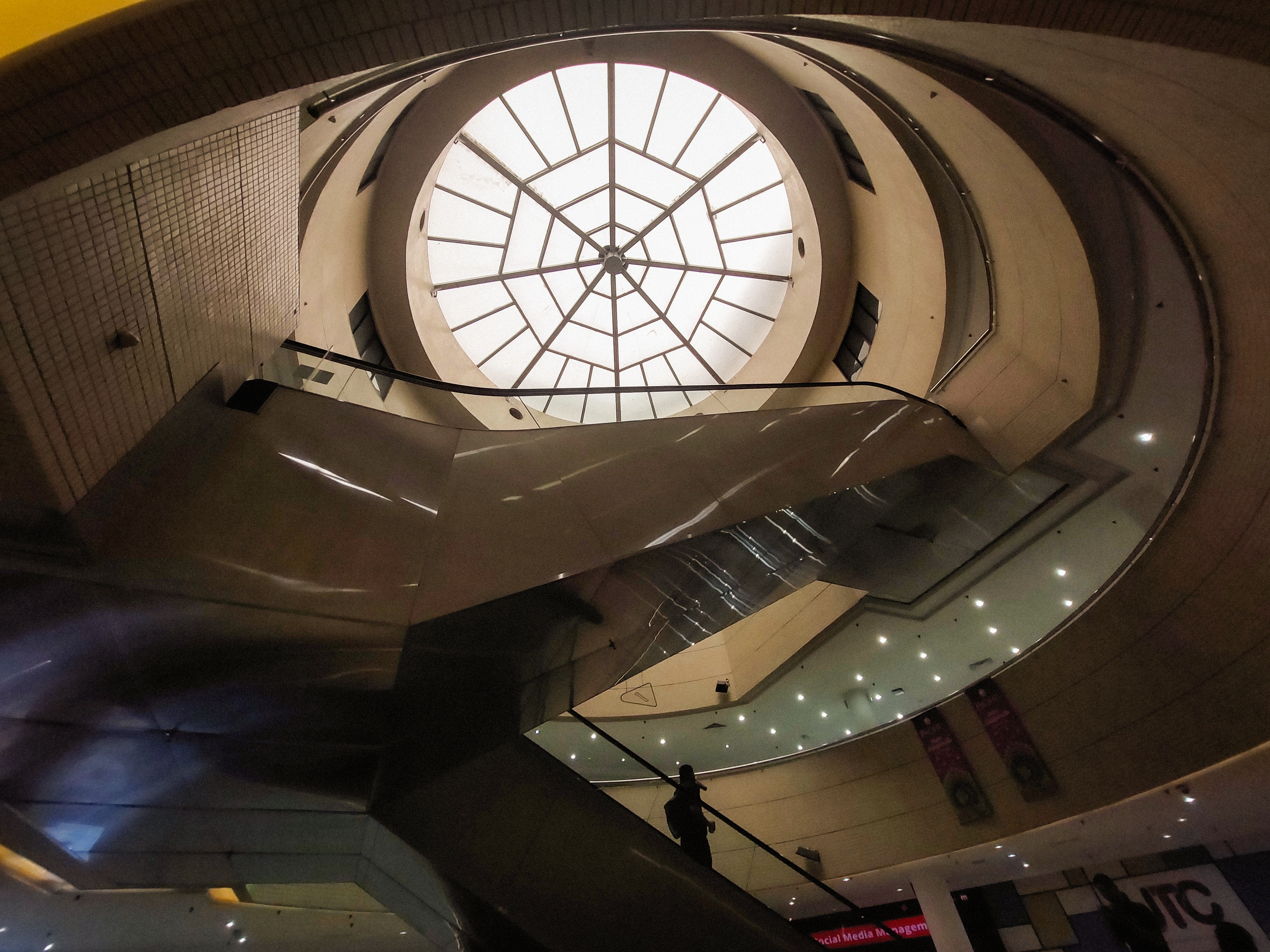
Central atrium of phase two.

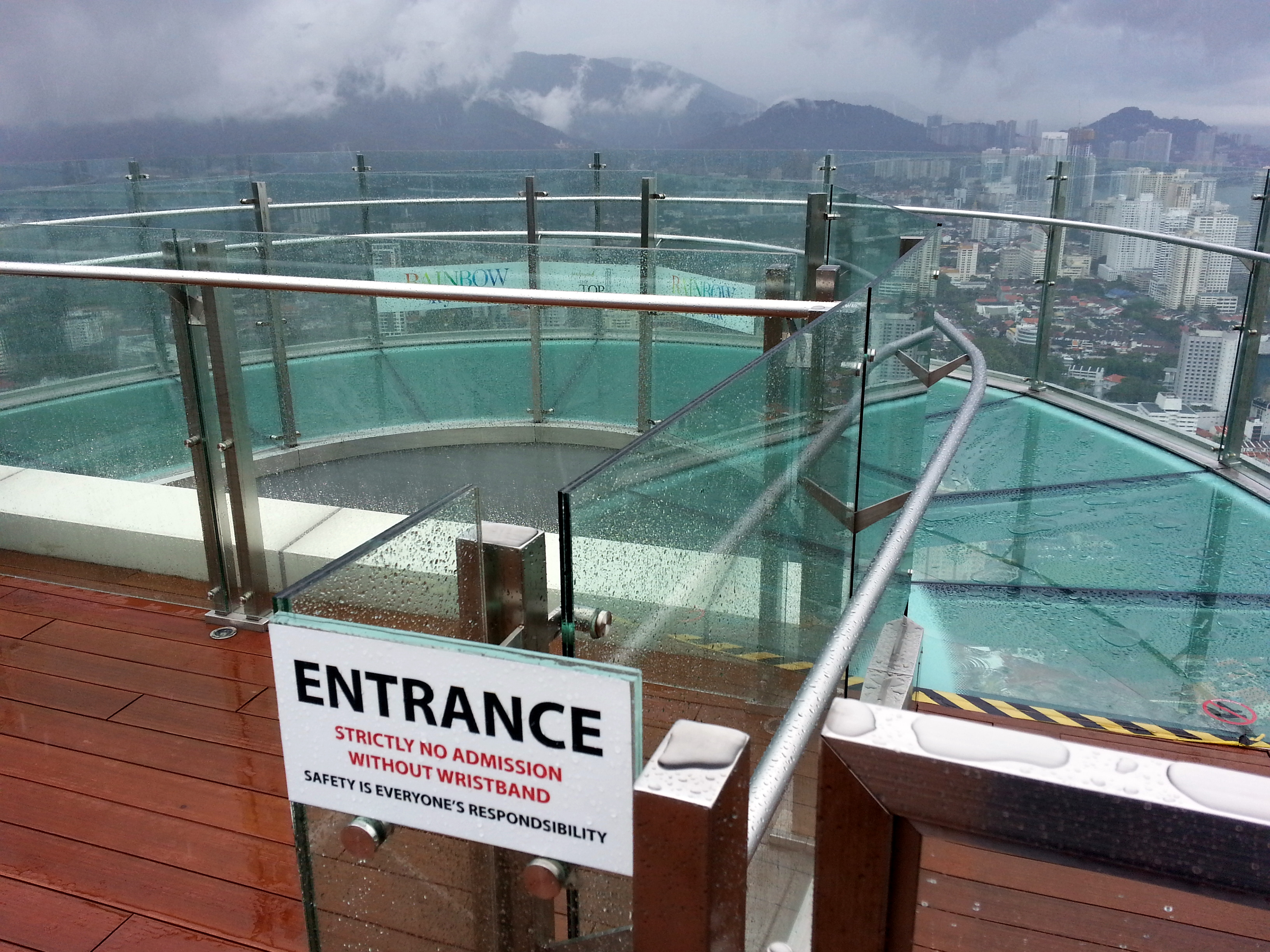
The Komtar Skywalk is billed as the tallest of its kind in Malaysia.

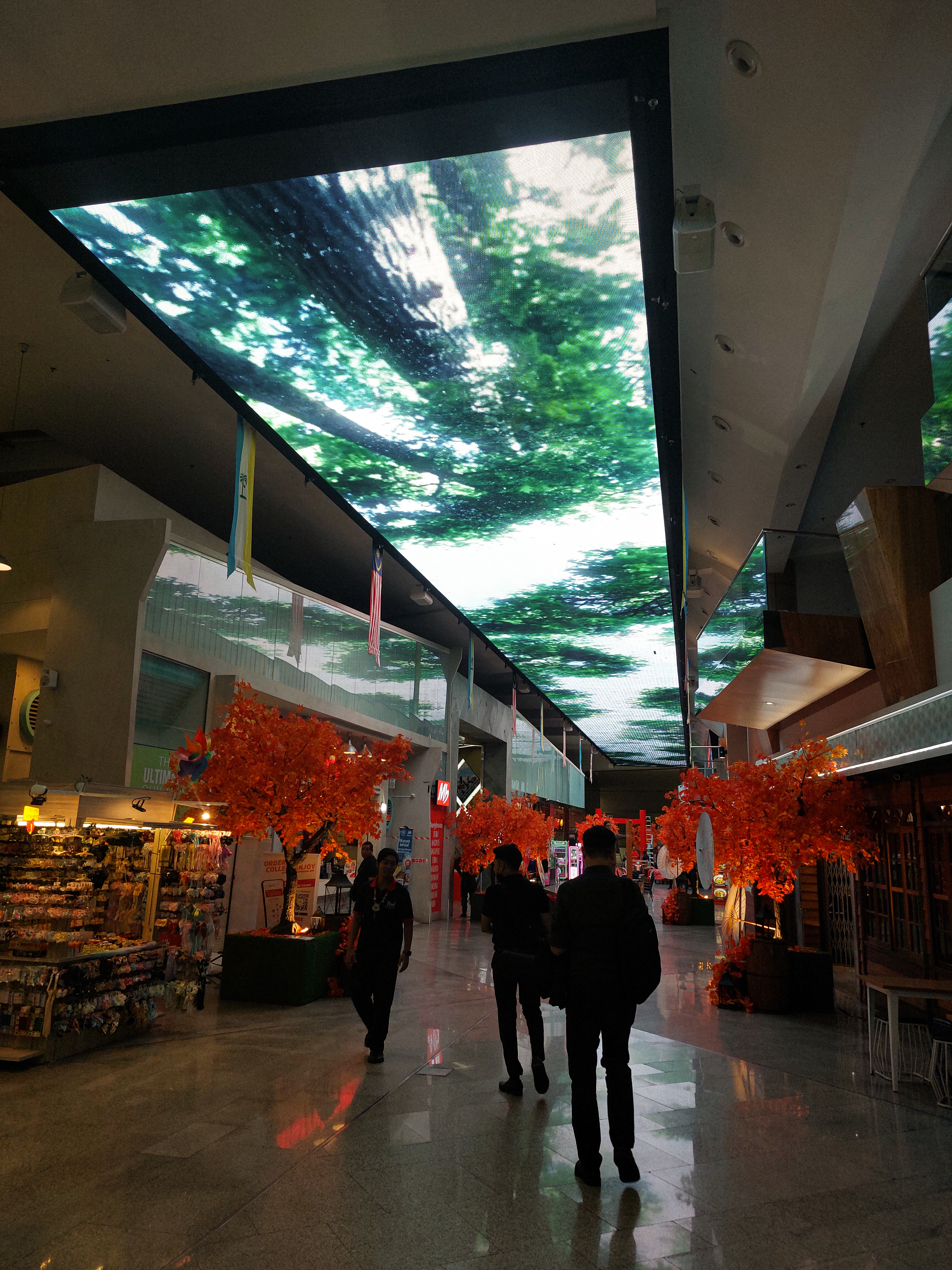
Alternate entrance of the skyscraper through The Top.

=== Observatory deck ===
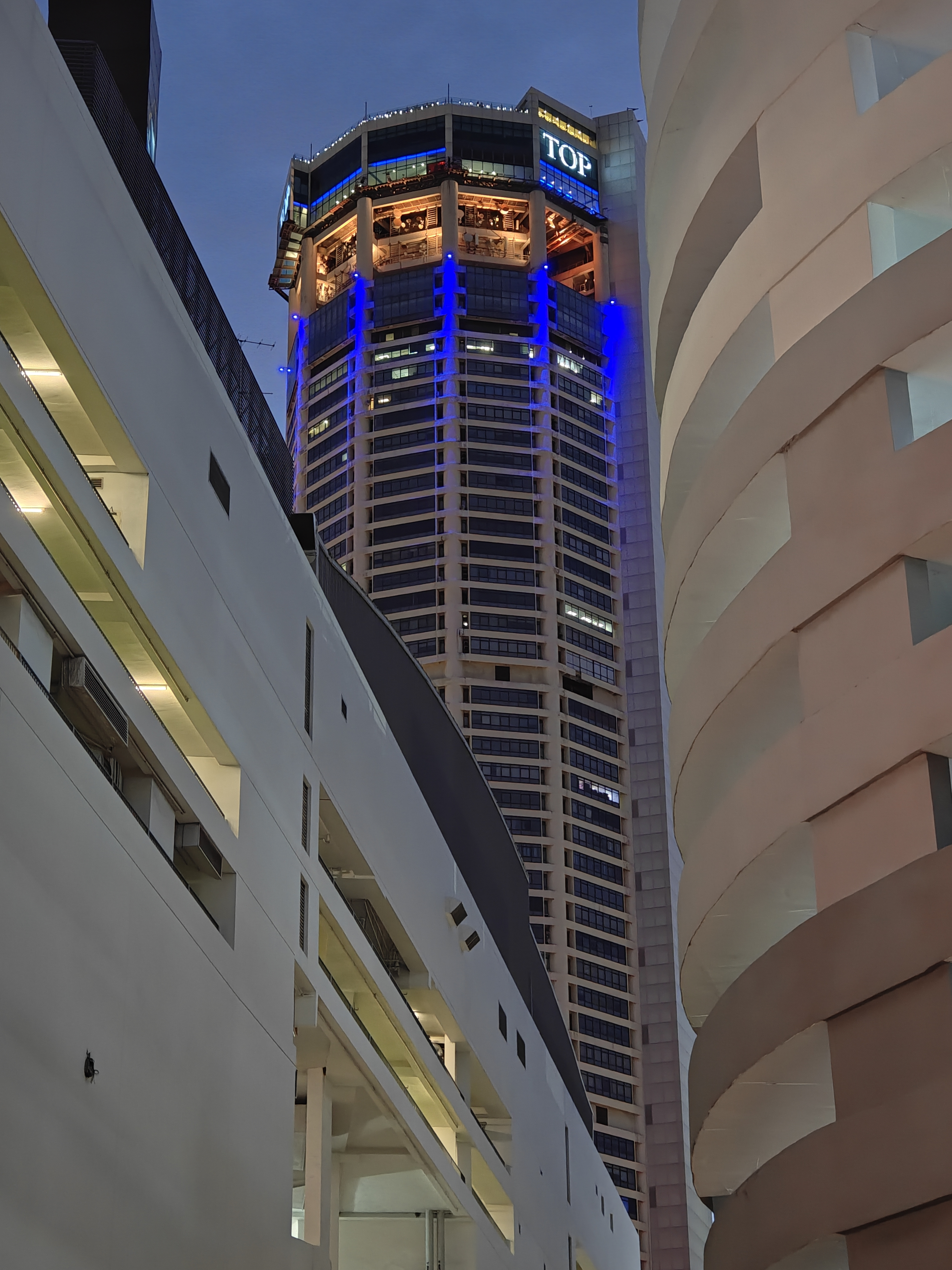
Komtar c. 2023, after redevelopment, with The Top at the upper floors.

The top floor of Komtar Tower, the 65th, was a helipad. Instead, the first publicly accessible observatory decks in the skyscraper were between the 57th to 60th floors. On 15 November 1989, the main observatory deck, the Tower Tourist Centre, was inaugurated at the 58th floor. A duty-free shop, the Metropolitan, opened at the 57th floor in mid-February 1990. The 59th and 60th floors housed a Chinese restaurant known as the Tower Palace. Other attractions include a video room and an amphitheatre for cultural shows.

Between 2014 and 2016, the top floors of Komtar Tower were rebuilt in an extension program known as The Top, which includes the addition of three upper stories and a complete overhaul of all publicly accessible portions of the complex. A new observatory deck, Window of the Top, was constructed at the 65th floor while an open-air deck was built at the 68th floor. Window of the Top, which stood at a height of 239 metres (784 ft), was only accessible through an express lift on the 5th floor. Visitors could view up to 150 kilometres (93 mi) away from the deck, which includes parts of Seberang Perai and Kedah across the Penang Strait.

Other attractions on Window of the Top include a souvenir store and an outdoor rope course. The 68th floor, standing at a height of 246.3 metres (808 ft), featured a restaurant called Top View and a semi-circle skywalk which extends beyond the main building.

=== Podium ===
The podium at Komtar, which encompasses the 1st to 4th floor, contains a shopping complex that opened in 1976. The complex enjoyed the status of northern Malaysia's only shopping complex, creating a retail monopoly with high rental returns, comparable to Sungei Wang Plaza in Kuala Lumpur during the time period. This situation, which persisted throughout the 1980s, was described as a "shopping centre vacuum".

The Dalit Cinema, operated by the Borneo Film Organisation, opened on 8 August 1981 as Komtar's first anchor tenant. Super Komtar opened on 6 December 1986 as the first department store in the complex. At the end of the 1980s, it became one of the most profitable and popular department stores in the country.

Japanese retail group Yaohan opened at Komtar in November 1988, becoming its first major foreign tenant. It had a staff of 350 and occupied an area of 130,000 square feet (12,000 m^{2}). The first Pizza Hut and White Castle outside of Kuala Lumpur opened at Komtar in January 1989 and on 14 June 1989 respectively. Singaporean bookstore chain Popular opened at the complex on 7 August 1991, which operated until 28 November 2021. In 1992, both Yaohan and Metrojaya mooted the idea of building separate department complexes under phase 2E and phase three of the complex, but were never built.

On 30 December 1997, Yaohan rebranded itself as Aktif Lifestyle after its Japanese parent company went bankrupt. Aktif Lifestyle faced financial difficulties and in 2004 the store was acquired by Parkson as Parkson Aktif. The department store closed in 2005. It was replaced by the ICT Digital Mall, which opened on 1 September 2010 as a "tech plaza". Super Komtar ceased operations on 9 March 2005 before re-opening as Pacific Hypermarket on 17 December 2008. In 2009, a large section of the podium was renovated into a pedestrian mall known as Komtar Walk, but failed to attract visitors and was abandoned in 2019 due to legal disputes between its operator and state authorities. The mall was demolished and rebuilt in January 2023.

=== Transportation ===
Komtar
- KOMTAR bus terminal

General information
- Location: Tek Soon Street; 10100 George Town, Penang; Malaysia
- System: Rapid Penang public bus terminal
- Owner: Penang state government, Penang Island City Council, Rapid Penang
- Bus routes: Rapid Penang: CAT, CT14, 11, 12, 101, 102, 103, 104, 201, 202, 203, 204, 206, 301, 302, 303, 304, 401, 401E, 502
- Bus stands: 5
Location

Komtar is served by the Komtar Bus Terminal, which functions as the main interchange station for Rapid Penang, the sole public transport operator in George Town. The terminal is jointly owned by the Penang state government, the Penang Island City Council and Rapid Penang.

Previously, the main interchange station at the city was the Prangin Road Bus Station. The station served as the terminal for private bus companies such as the Hin Company, the Lim Seng Seng Company and the Yellow Bus Company. However, it shut down in 1990 for future developments along the Prangin Canal.

Throughout the late-1980s and 1990s, the terminal was consistently criticised for poor cleanliness and maintenance, with a reputation of frequent mugging and robberies. These criticisms were part of a wider negative sentiment against the state of public transport in Penang at the time.

The introduction of state operator Rapid Penang in July 2007 superseded the private bus companies, eventually operating the entire terminal. For decades, the bus terminal had been a place of congregation for vagabonds and the homeless, but since September 2023 they have been relocated to nearby state-funded homeless shelters. Currently, the terminal serves the 11, 12, 101, 102, 103, 104, 201, 202, 203, 204, 206, 301, 302, 303, 304, 401, 401E, 502, CAT and CT14 bus routes of Rapid Penang.

Since the early 2000s, Komtar has been proposed to contain a terminal station of potential light rail transit and monorail lines, such as the Mutiara line, the Tanjong Tokong line, and the Ayer Itam line. It is proposed that construction of the station would start in September or October 2024, with an expected completion date of 2030. Komtar is also the terminal station for the proposed George Town tram line.

=== Other buildings ===
Besides the main complex, three other structures stood at the site. The oldest was a 470-suite, 17-storey hotel block that opened as the Shangri-La Hotel on 2 April 1986. It rebranded as Traders Hotel on 1 April 2006, and as Hotel Jen in late 2014. An auditorium in the shape of a geodesic dome, known as Tunku Hall, was built at the roof of the podium in July 1986. Inspired by The Tech in San Jose, the auditorium repurposed as a science museum in 2016. Two further shopping malls were constructed east of the complex; Prangin Mall opened in 2001, while 1st Avenue opened in 2010.

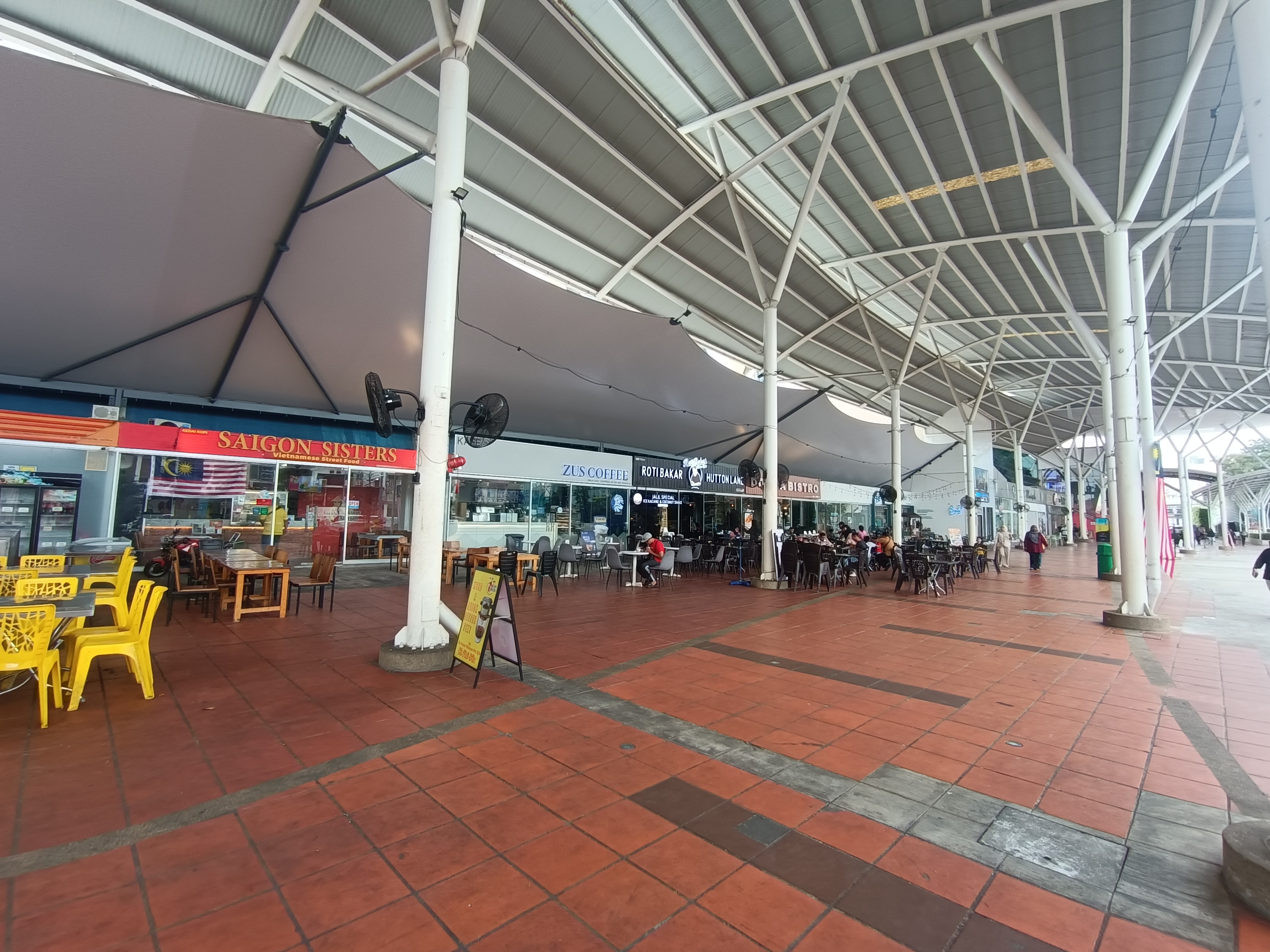
KOMTAR Walk, 2024.

Prangin Mall at Tek Soon St, 2022.

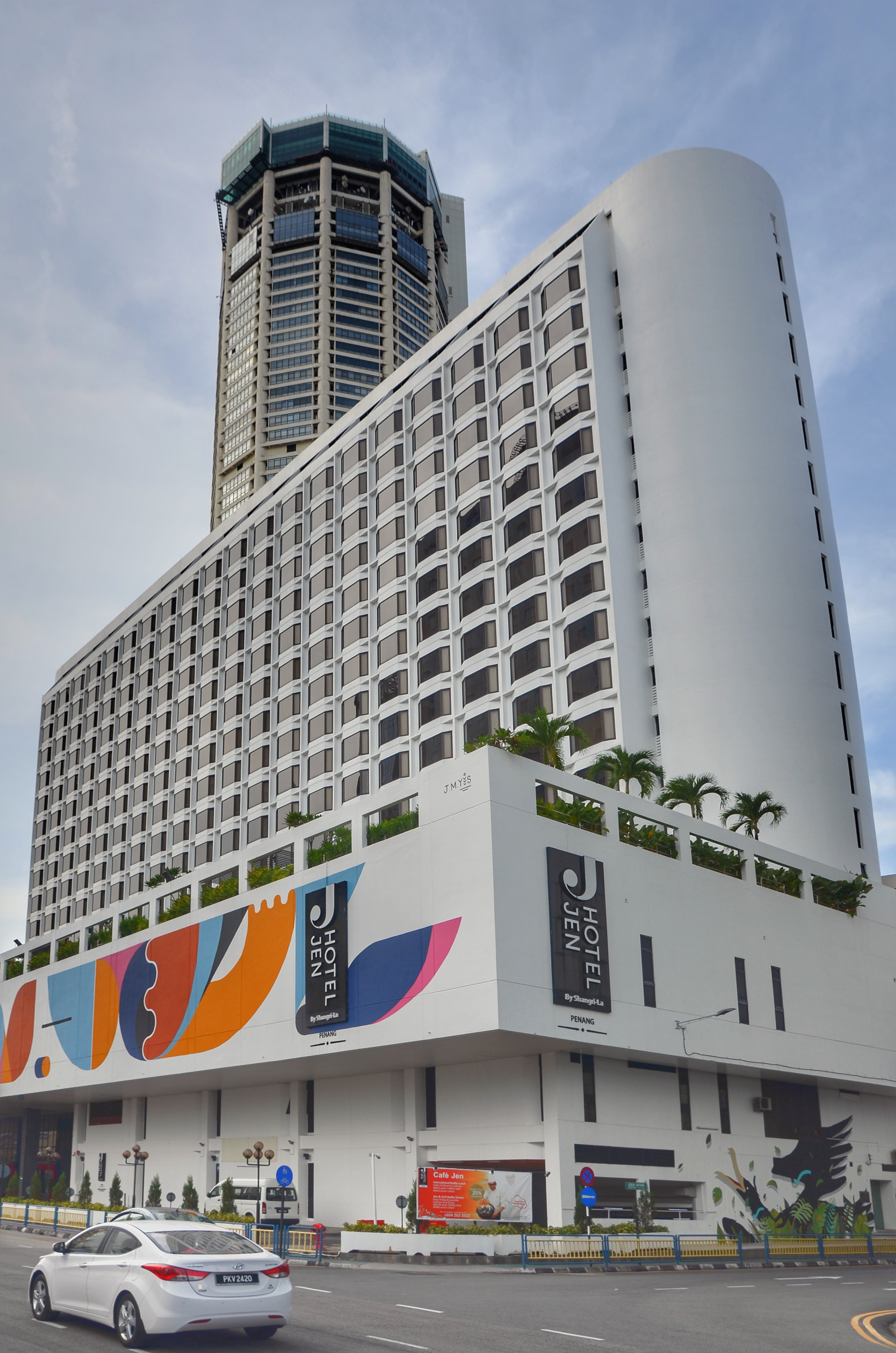
Jen Hotel, a four-star hotel with Komtar in the foreground, 2022.

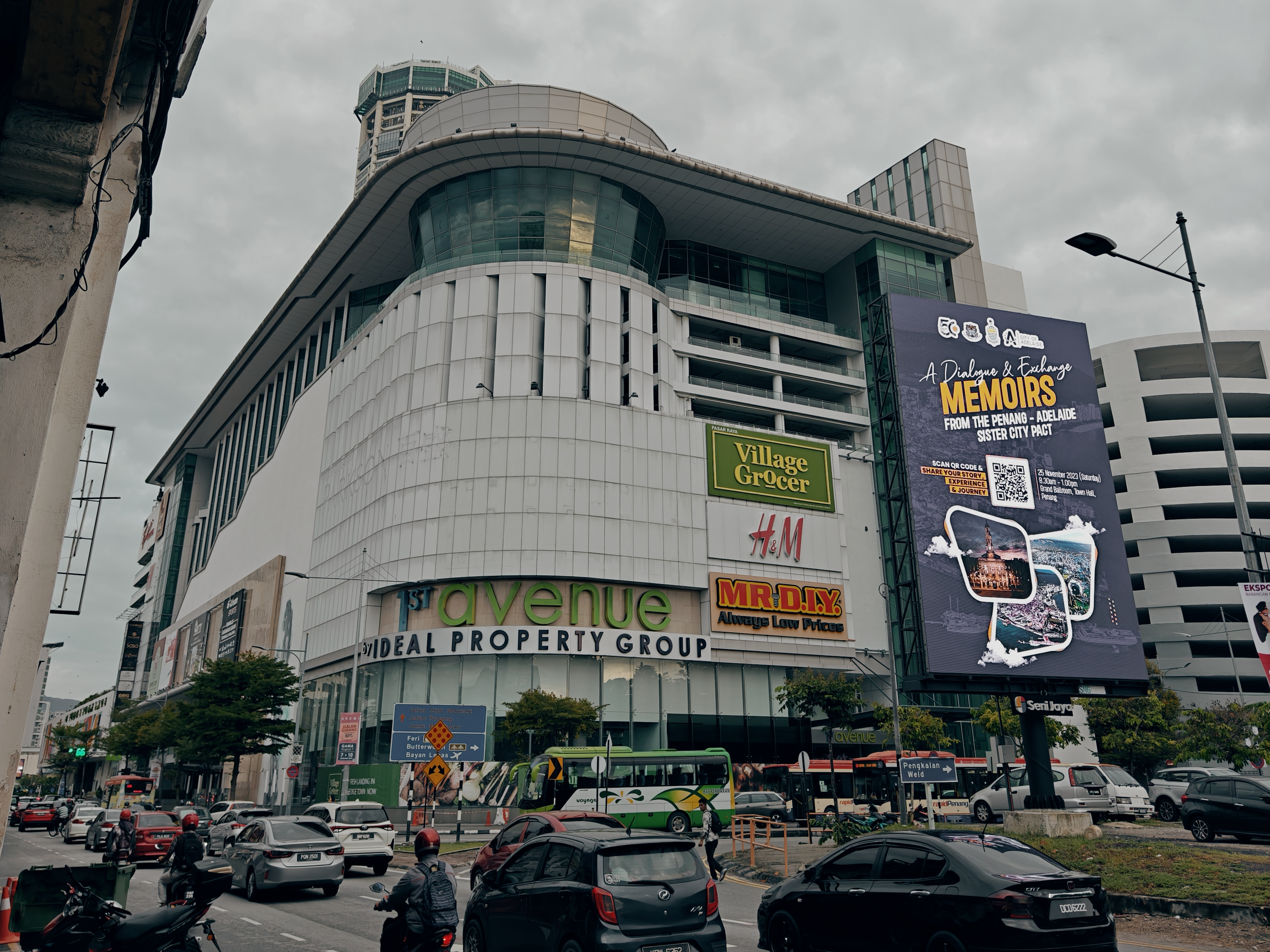
1st Avenue (phase three), along Magazine Rd., 2023.

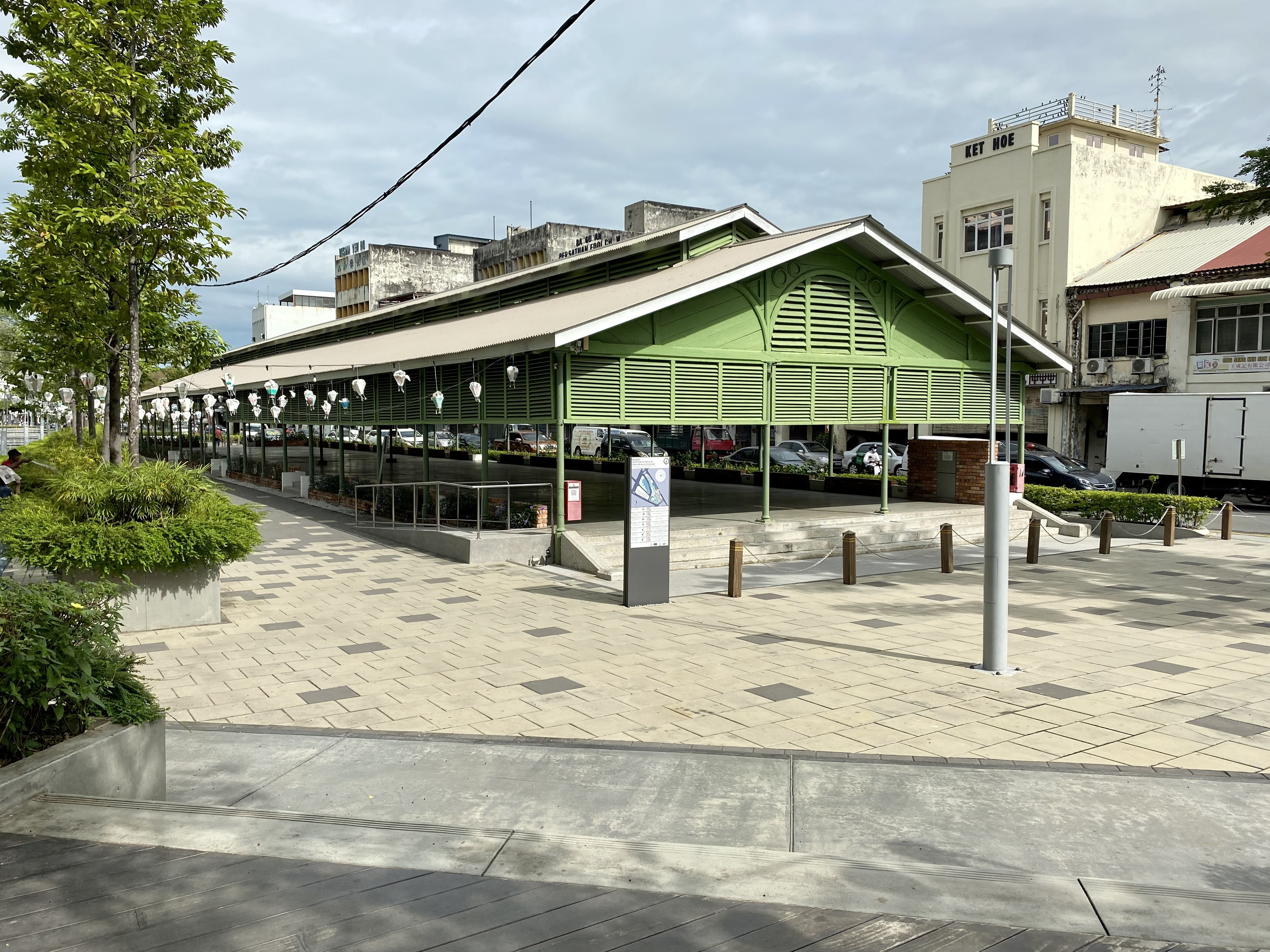
Sia Boey Park, 2021.

=== Logo and branding ===
Between 1969 and 1970, Komtar was known as the Central Area Redevelopment Plan. In 1970, the project launched as the Penang Urban Centre or as Kompleks Angkasa Perdana. Usage of the current name began to appear after 1980 or 1981, with former prime minister Abdul Razak as its namesake. In 2015, a logo was introduced featuring the words "Komtar" in red to symbolise ong, the Hokkien word for auspicious, with the letter "T" as a hand-drawn image of the tower.

== Legacy ==
=== Reception ===
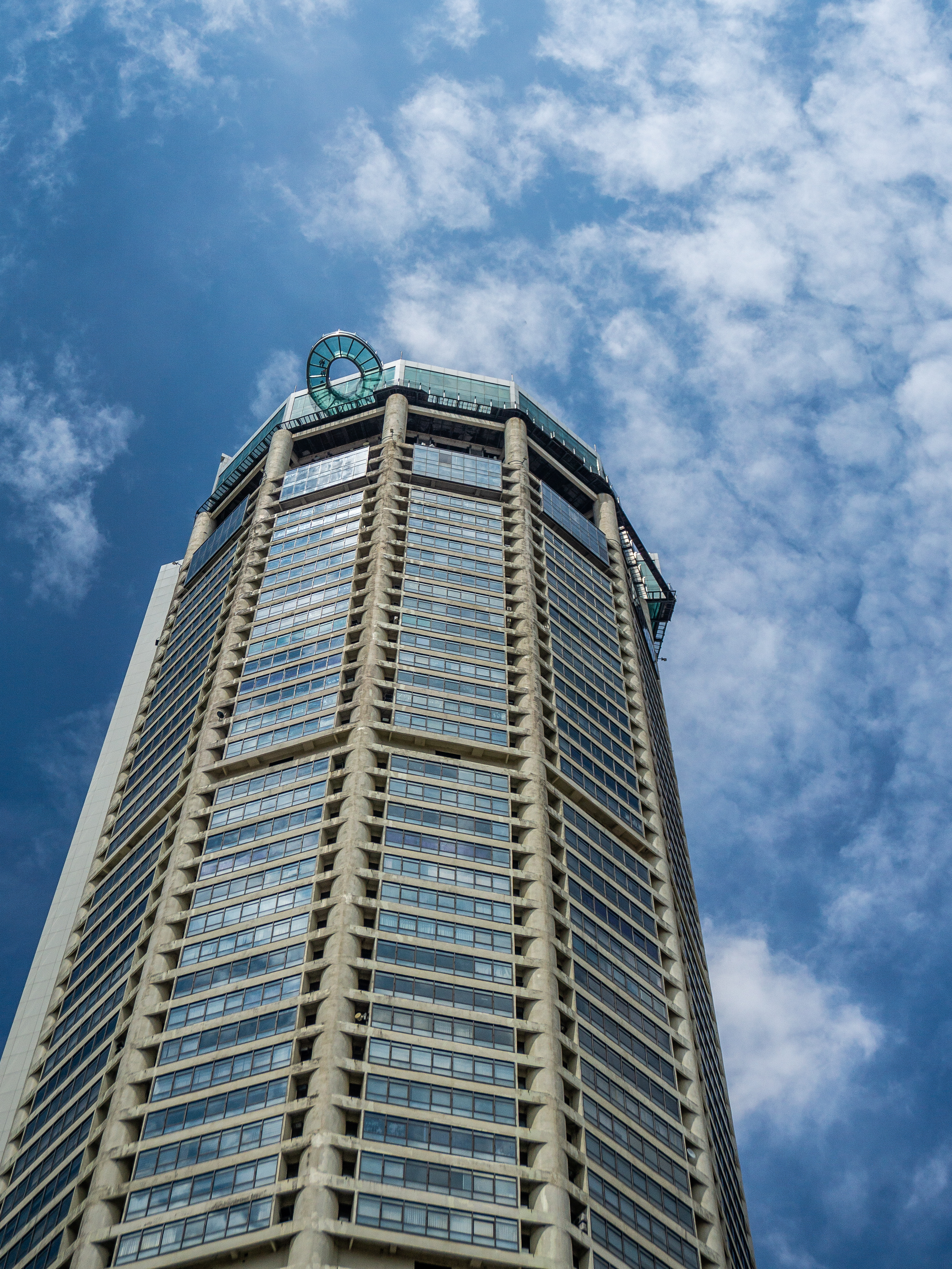
From Penang Road, 2024.

The intention to build Komtar was initially perceived to be controversial. Opposition parties such as the Democratic Action Party and Pekemas often criticised the project for being unnecessary and expensive. During the 1974 state elections, both parties included scrapping the entire project as part of their election manifesto.

Throughout its construction the project was marred by cost issues. During preparations in 1972, the compensation provided by the state government for displaced residents was described as insufficient. While the entire complex of five phases was to be given a budget of RM200 million, government sources in September 1975 suggested that phase one alone cost over RM300 million. A magazine in February 1976 alleged a total cost of RM500 million, putting doubts on the state's capabilities to finance the entire project. In 1990, the government reported a cost of RM279.5 million (RM642.5 million in 2023 value), with a revenue of only RM185 million (RM425 million in 2023 value).

After its completion, criticisms shifted to gentrification. In 1979, Kampong Kolam state representative Ooi Ean Kwong said that "most people at Komtar go there to pay their electricity bills, not shopping." American architect Victor Papanek predicted that Komtar would fail and "become an eyesore", creating congestion and pollution in the city centre. Other accusations include Komtar being a "monument" to Lim Chong Eu's tenure as chief minister, such as a remark from opposition politician Karpal Singh who described Komtar as "Dr. Lim's Taj Mahal".

The initial occupancy rates in the complex's office block have led Lim Kit Siang to describe Komtar and the contemporary Dayabumi Complex as "white elephants". This was reflected by poor sales of office space in the complex, which was impacted by severe office space gluts in Penang in 1984. While local, state, and federal offices occupied the lower portions of Komtar Tower, the sale of "high-zone" office space to private sectors was reportedly "not encouraging" by 1985.

Some critics in retrospect viewed Komtar as a failure, having achieved none of its desired objective of replacing dilapidating city slums in George Town with modernised city blocks. Furthermore, the subsidence controversy over Prangin Mall's construction in 1997 led to calls for the project's cancellation by residents over concerns on its damage towards historical structures nearby.

=== On urban development in Penang ===
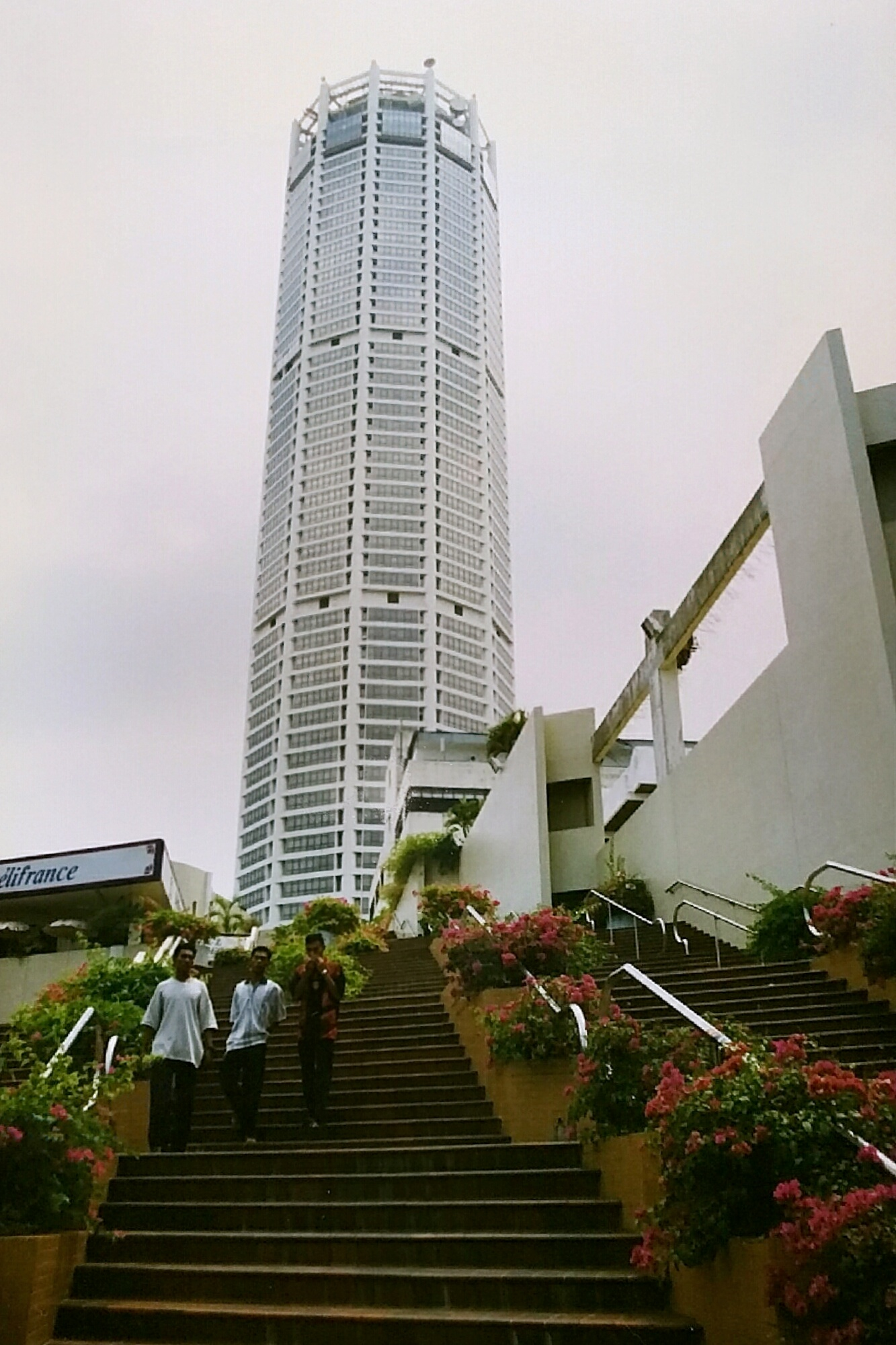
Main stairwell, 1997.

The construction of Komtar resulted in the destruction of a huge section of the historic quarters along Penang Road and the Prangin Canal, which had been an important enclave of the Chinese riverine settlement in George Town. Over three hundred historic landmarks were demolished in the process, including the former Jinricksha Office, the former campus of Li Tek Primary School, and the Capitol and Oriental Emporium. Gladstone Road, which ran from the Magazine Circus to the west and Carnavon Street to the east, was built over and disappeared under the complex, leaving a remnant at its eastern end that was removed in 2000.

Starting from the 1970s, the city centre suffered from mass depopulation from displacements of entire neighbourhoods and businesses directly caused by Komtar's construction. With the rise of the service industry in Penang after its industrialisation in the 1980s, Komtar's status as a large, centralised financial district decimated smaller, traditional businesses in the city centre. The irreversible changes towards the city centre following Komtar's completion was cited as one of the factors leading to a rise of heritage preservation movements in Penang. In 1986, the Penang Heritage Trust was founded, and in 1989 the first heritage conservation enactments were passed in the state legislature. These efforts culminated in the establishment of a conservation zone, involving a 269 acres (109 ha) "heritage core zone" and a 390 acres (160 ha) "buffer zone" inscribed by UNESCO in 2008, which banned any alterations to all historic structures in George Town's urban core.

Komtar was a centrepiece under the ideal Wawasan 2020, which encouraged urban construction and renewal throughout Malaysian cities, leading to a development boom. The historic quarters became very susceptible to demolition and removal like those of Komtar. Private development applications in Penang peaked in the mid-1990s, before the outbreak of the Asian financial crisis in 1997.

Despite the circumstances, the Penang state government has never undertaken any urban redevelopment programmes within the historic quarters since Komtar. Instead, they opted for land reclamation. This strategy, first employed in the expansion of the Bayan Lepas Free Industrial Zone in the late 1970s, allowed state authorities to skip negotiations and avoid overly complicated resettlement agreements, thereby reducing acquisition costs. From 1980 to 2000, almost all of George Town's east coast was reclaimed, and by 2015 total reclaimed land in the city was estimated to be 9.5 square kilometres (3.7 sq mi) in area.

=== Architectural and cultural importance ===
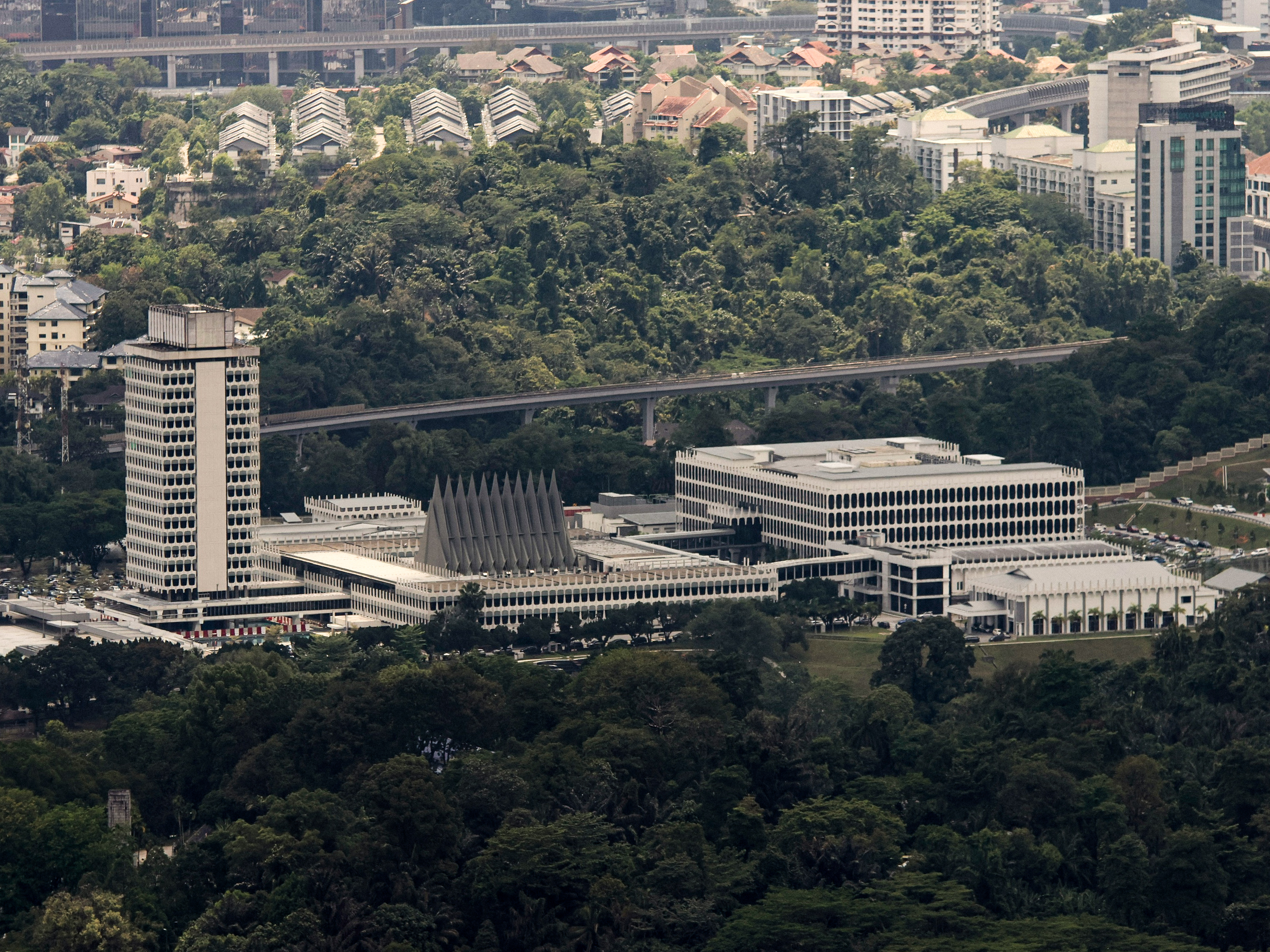
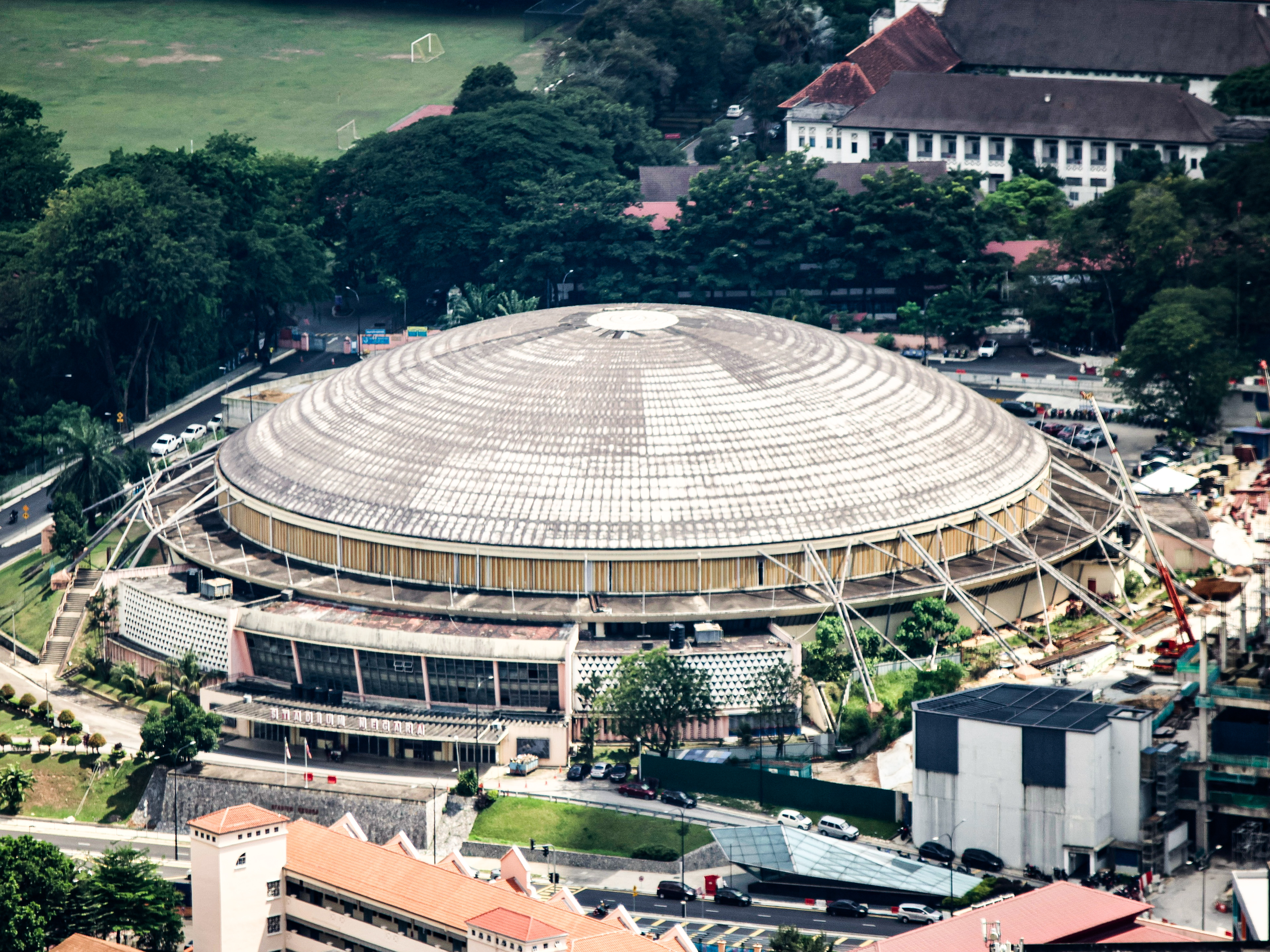
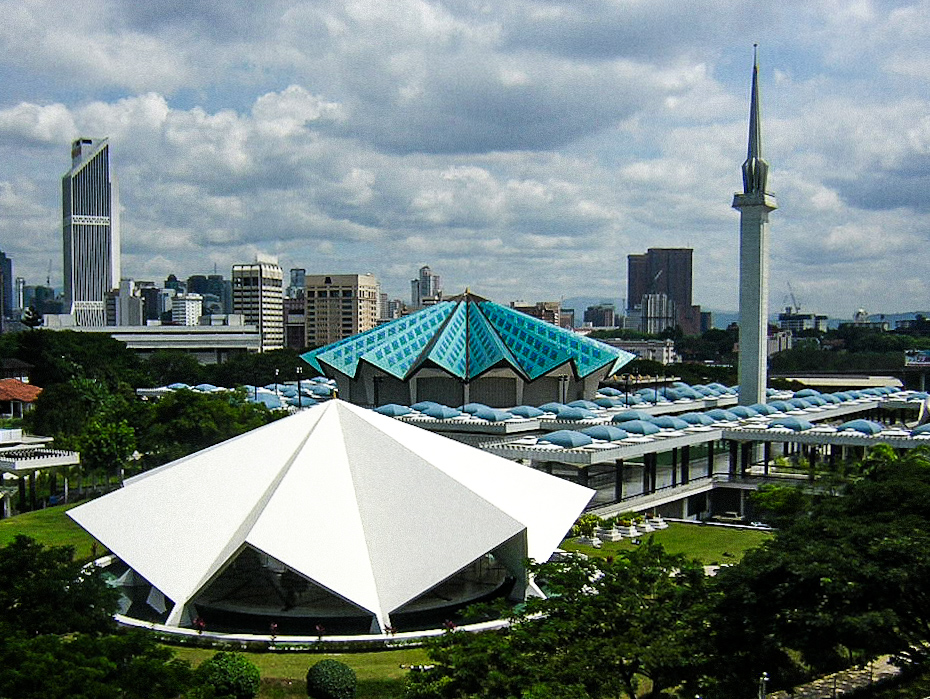
Clockwise from top: Houses of Parliament, National Mosque, National Stadium.

Komtar is regarded as an icon of Penang, and is seen as the state's most famous landmark. It is also an important hub for Penang's public bus system, and is the administrative centre of George Town and Penang. It was described as a "city within a city", and was hailed as one of the last "great national symbols of the 1970s".

Architecture-wise, Komtar was Penang's first major modernist structure and served as an important example of modernist architecture in Southeast Asia. The complex was reflective of Malaysia's post-independence period in the 1960s with the construction of modernist landmarks such as the Houses of Parliament (1959–1962), the National Mosque (1963–1965), and the National Stadium (1960–1962) which intended to replace traditional architectural styles with bold and modern designs. The geodesic dome was noted as Buckminster Fuller's last significant architectural contribution in Southeast Asia.

Komtar's layout and design were radical and utopian for its time. However, while modernist structures in Malaysia were built to expel and erase the country's colonial past, Komtar was built as a unique expression of critical regionalism, where its modernist elements were incorporated in a way to resonate with George Town's entrenched colonial history. Despite this, Komtar lacked enough local appreciation for its regionalist characteristics, and was rejected by the populace for being too radical and impractical. Komtar's failure to revitalise George Town has become a notable case study for failed architectural experiments.

== Gallery ==
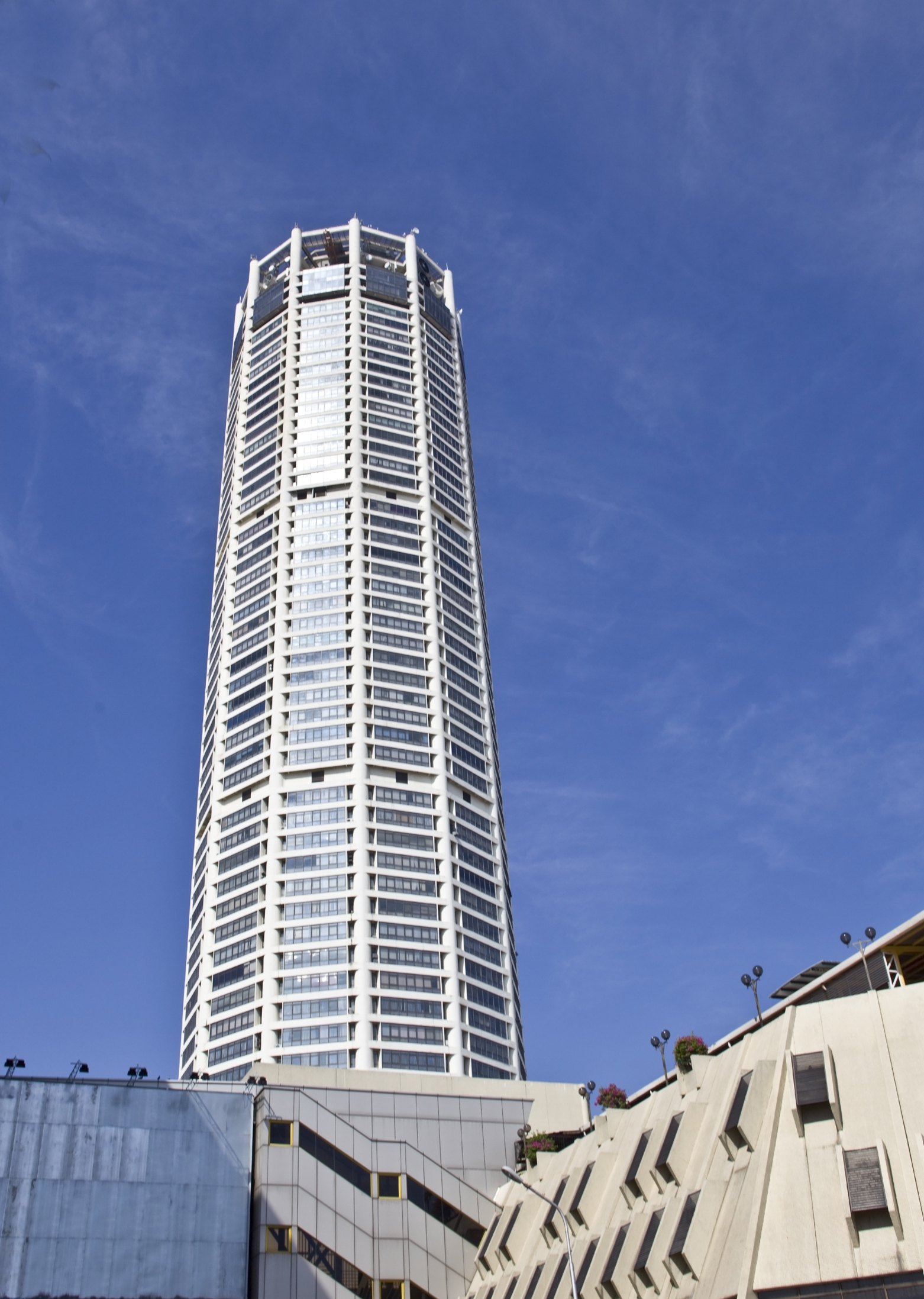
From Ria Road, 2010.

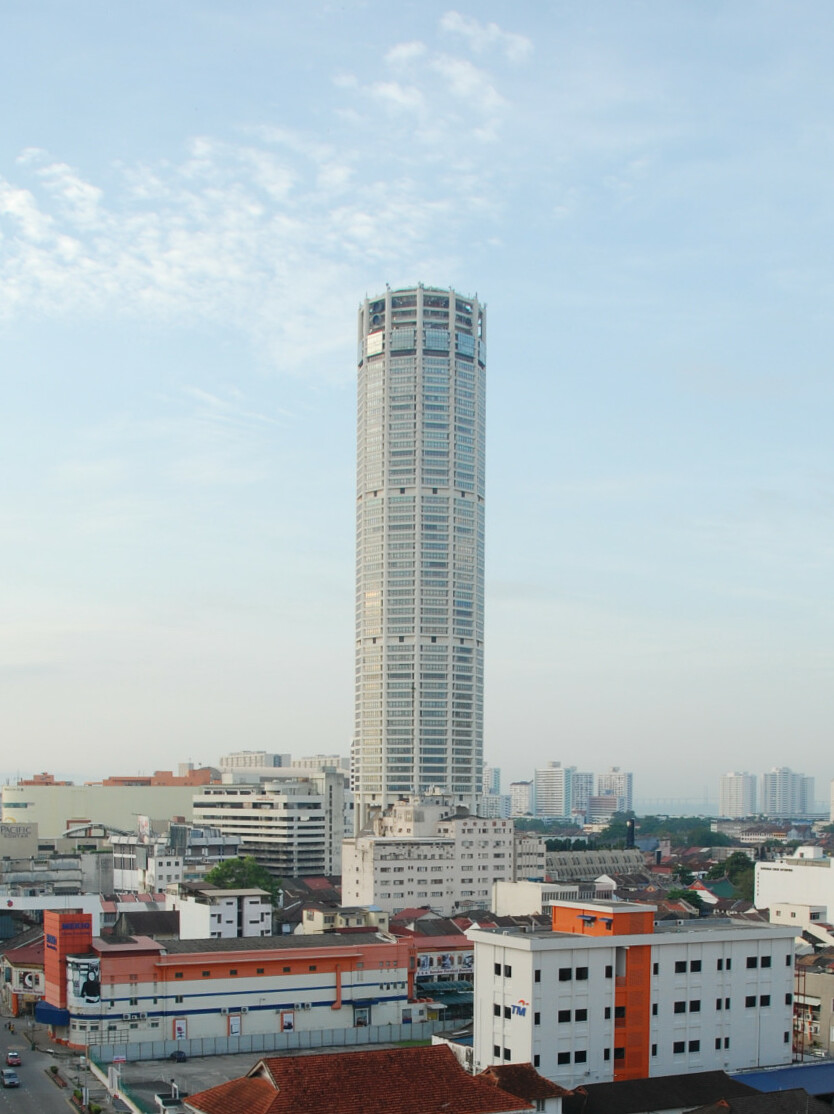
View from Burma Road, 2011.

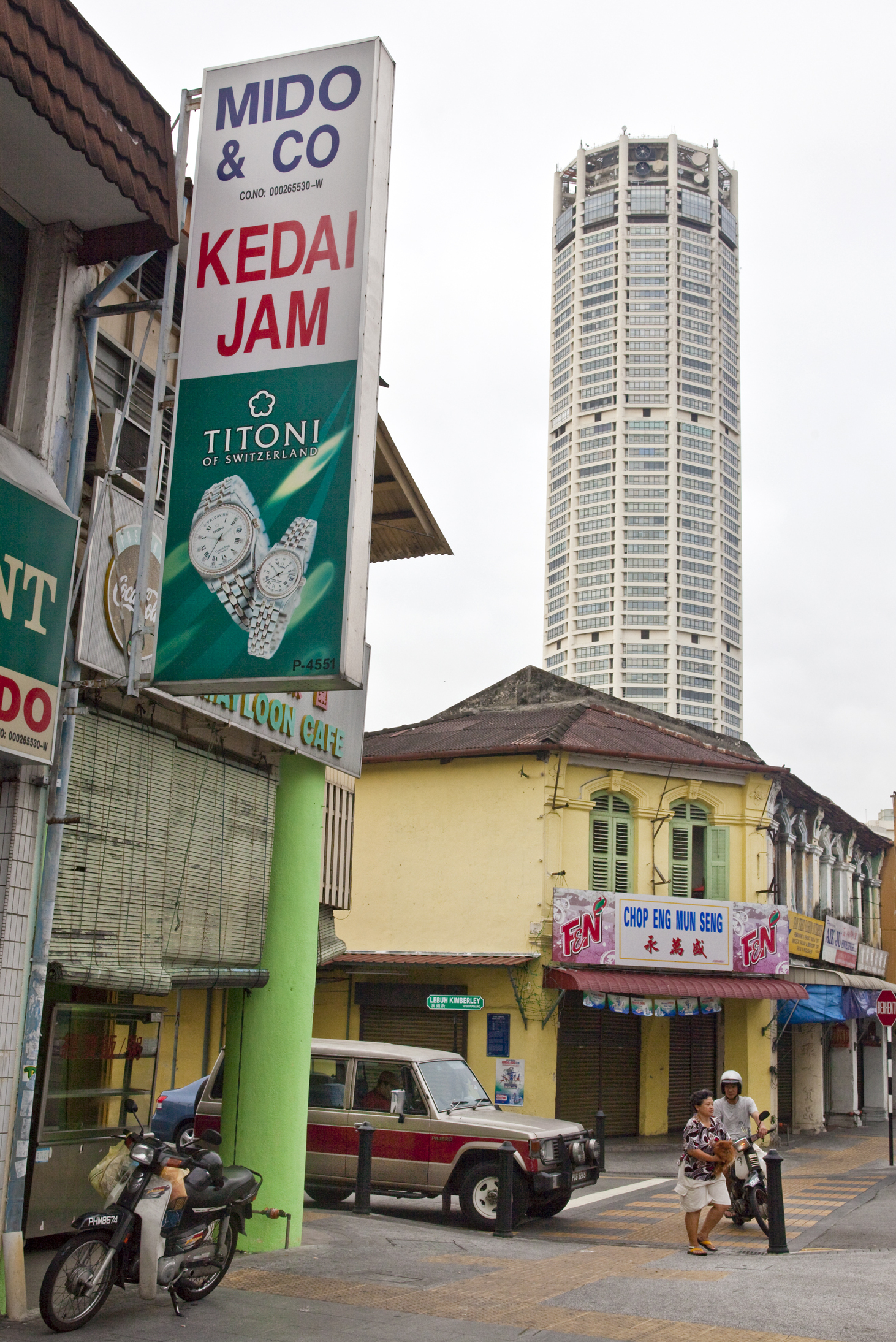
From Penang Road, 2010.

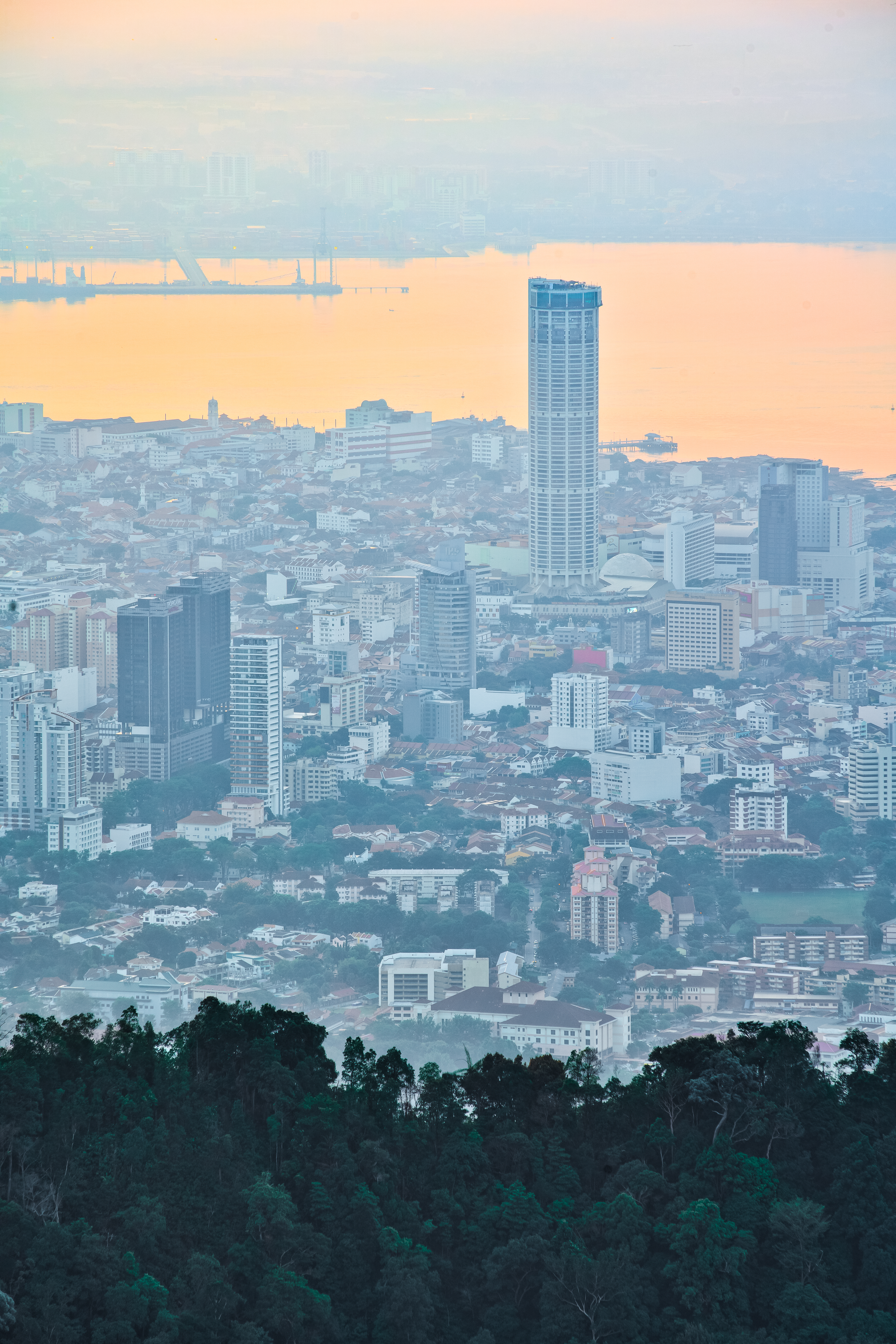
Komtar and its surrounding skyline from Penang Hill, 2019.
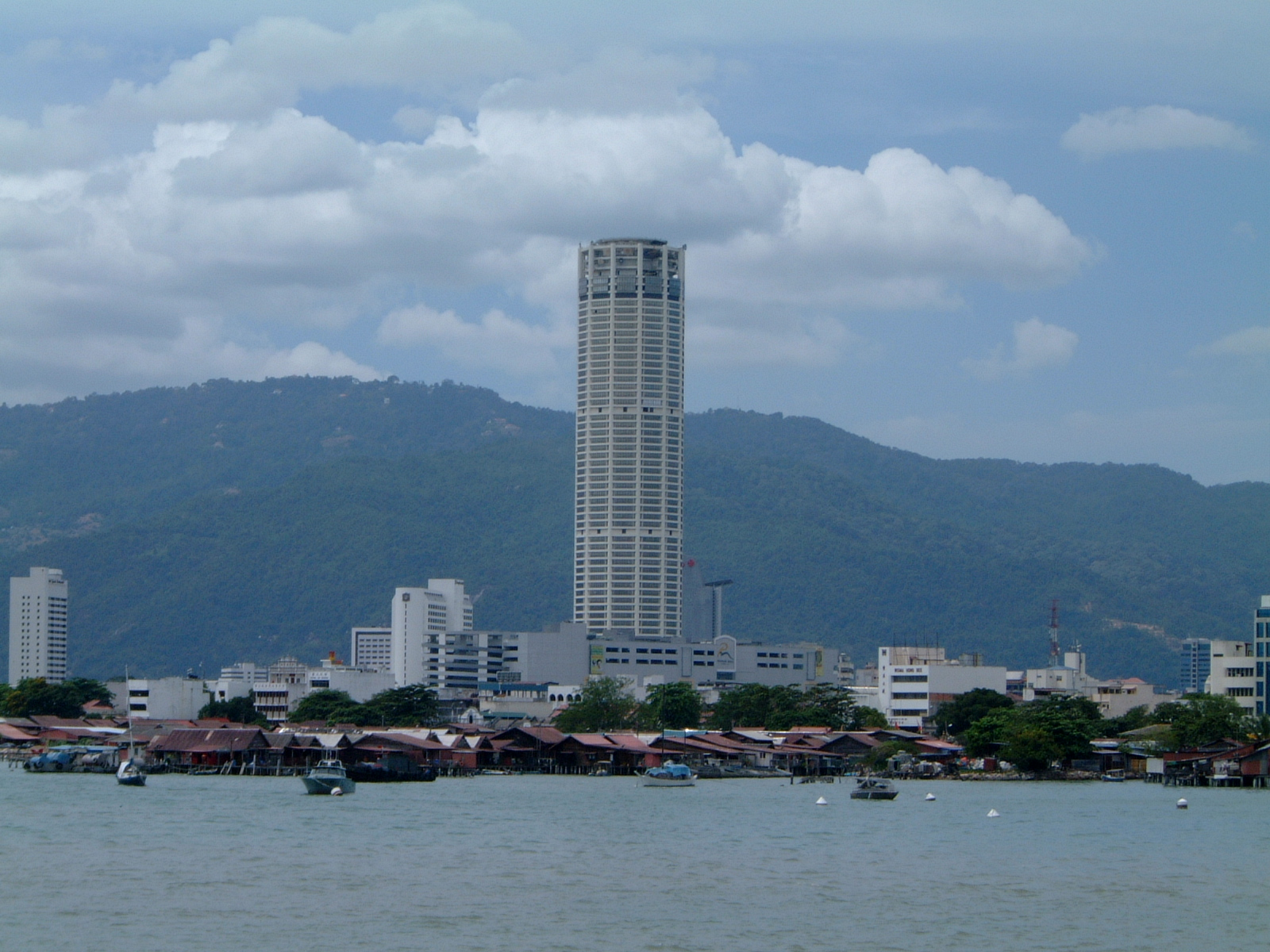
Exterior of Komtar with clan jetties in foreground, 2003.

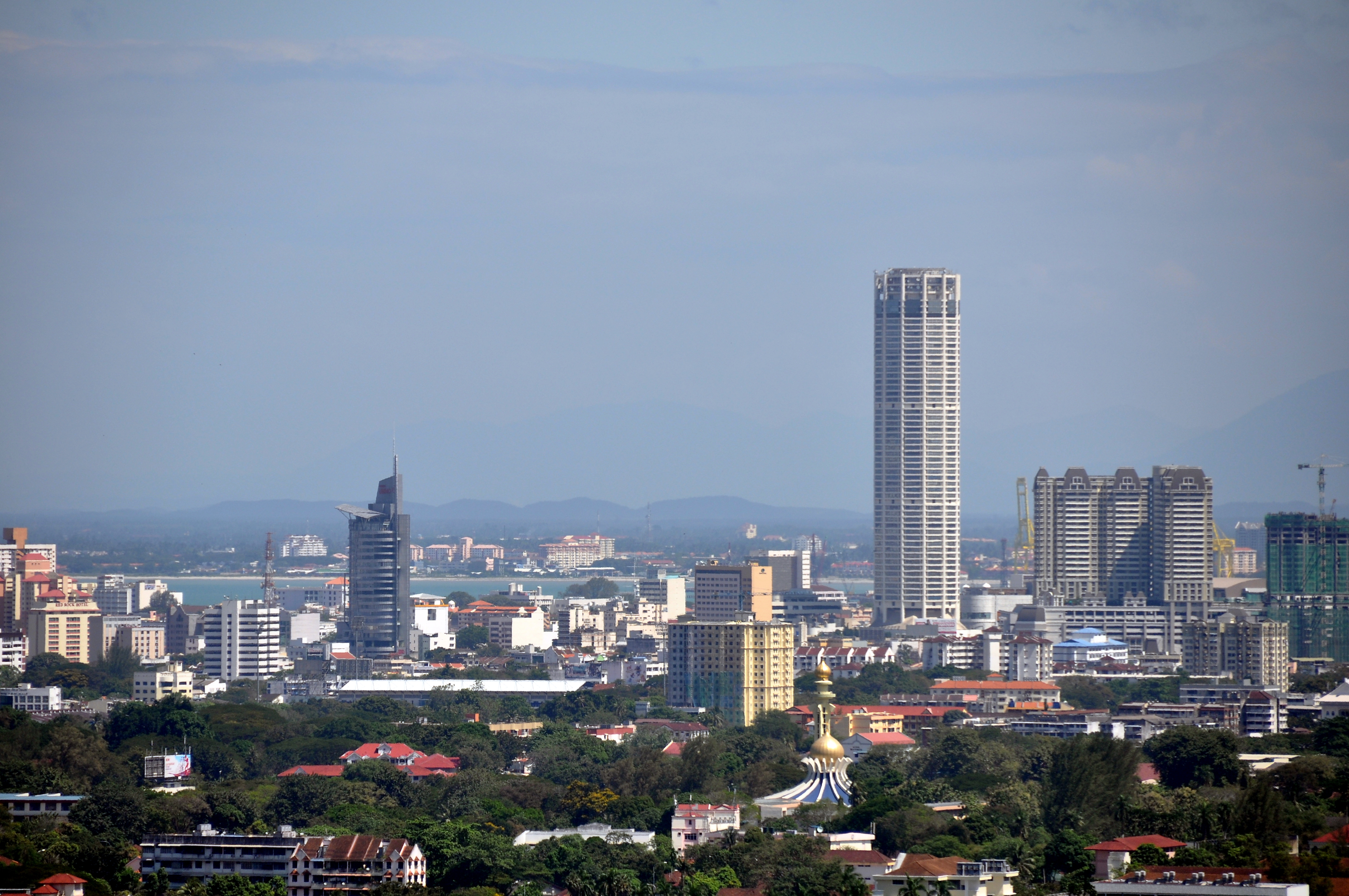
From Kek Lok Si Temple, 2009.

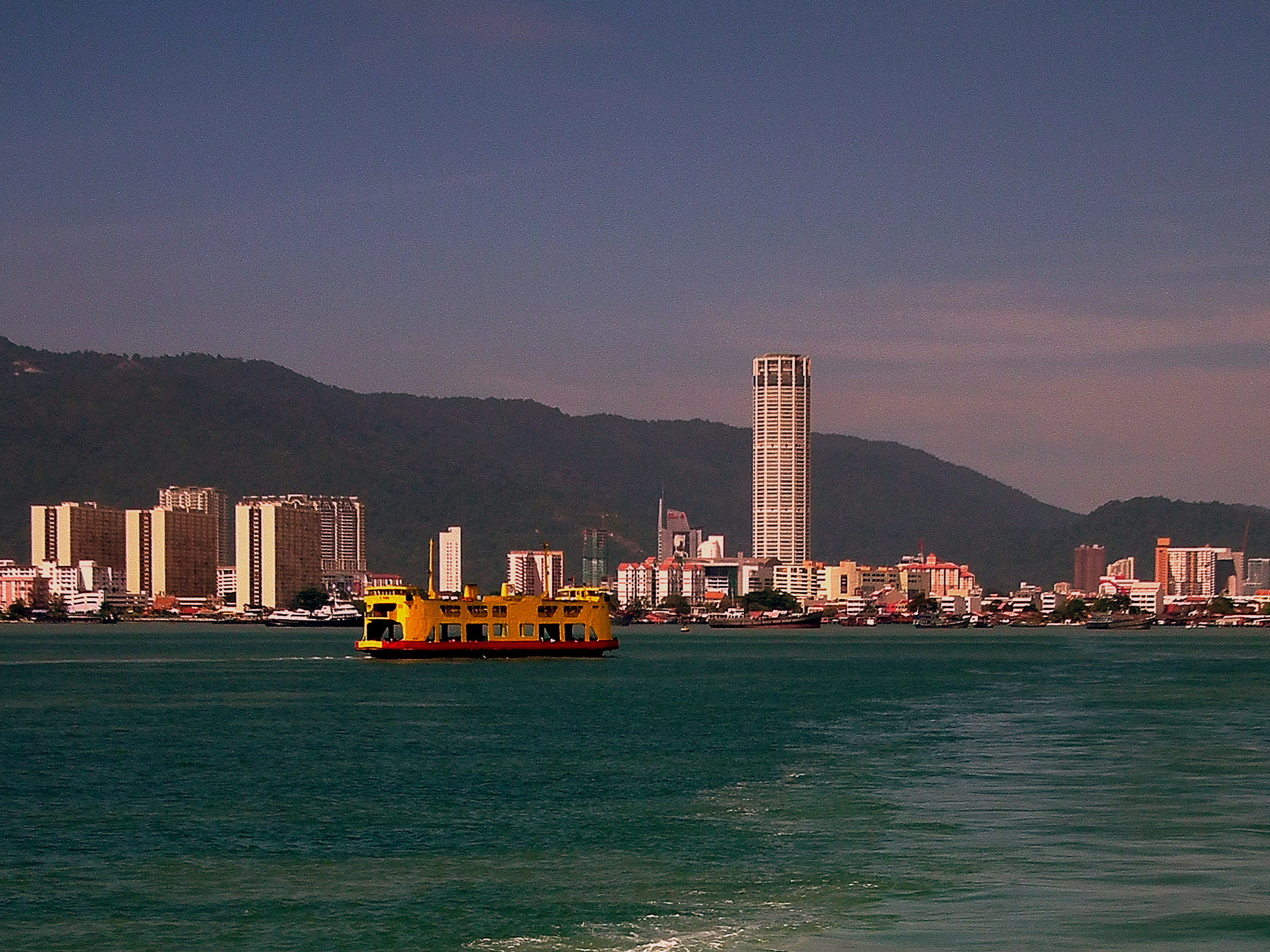
Across Penang Strait towards Seberang Perai, 2012

== See also ==
- Penang Bridge
- Kuala Lumpur City Centre
- World Trade Center (1973–2001)
- Architecture of Penang
