= Komtar (state constituency) =

State constituency in Penang, Malaysia

Komtar (N28)
Penang constituency
- Komtar (olive) on Penang

State constituency
- Legislature: Penang State Legislative Assembly
MLA
Teh Lai Heng
PH
- Constituency created: 2004
- First contested: 2004
- Last contested: 2023

Demographics
- Electors (2023): 15,532
- Area (km²): 2

Komtar is a state constituency in Penang, Malaysia, that has been represented in the Penang State Legislative Assembly since 2004. It covers George Town's city centre, including the eponymous Komtar, which houses Penang's administrative centre.

The state constituency was first contested in 2004 and is mandated to return a single Assemblyman to the Penang State Legislative Assembly under the first-past-the-post voting system. Since 2013, the State Assemblyman for Komtar is Teh Lai Heng from the Democratic Action Party (DAP), which is part of the state's ruling coalition, Pakatan Harapan (PH).

== Definition ==
=== Polling districts ===
According to the federal gazette issued on 18 July 2023, the Komtar constituency is divided into 14 polling districts.

State constituency	Polling districts	Code	Location
Komtar (N28)	Dickens Street	049/28/01	SJK (C) Hu Yew Seah
Komtar (N28)	Leboh Cintra	049/28/02	Taman Bimbingan Kanak-Kanak (Tabika) Nurul Islam
Komtar (N28)	Kampung Kolam	049/28/03	Pusat Belia Lebuh Acheh
Komtar (N28)	Leboh Acheh	049/28/04	Pusat Belia Lebuh Acheh
Komtar (N28)	Leboh Melayu	049/28/05	SK Tan Sri P. Ramlee
Komtar (N28)	Hong Kong Street	049/28/06	George Town World Heritage Inc
Komtar (N28)	Komtar	049/28/07	Tapak Landskap B, Prangin Mall
Komtar (N28)	Madras Lane	049/28/08	SJK (C) Hu Yew Seah
Komtar (N28)	Jalan Timah	049/28/09	SK Tan Sri P. Ramlee
Komtar (N28)	Jalan Lines	049/28/10	SK Tan Sri P. Ramlee
Komtar (N28)	Jalan Dato' Kramat	049/28/11	The Penang Buddhist Association Kindergarten
Komtar (N28)	Irving Road	049/28/12	Pusat Kegiatan Guru Kelawai
Komtar (N28)	Jalan Pahang	049/28/13	The Penang Buddhist Association Kindergarten
Komtar (N28)	Jalan Kim Bian Aik	049/28/14	Persatuan Leong See Kah Miew

This state seat encompasses the heart of George Town's city centre, including Komtar Tower, Penang's tallest skyscraper and the administrative centre for the entire State of Penang. The Office of the Chief Minister of Penang is housed within Komtar as well. In addition, the Komtar constituency covers a significant portion of George Town's UNESCO World Heritage Site, specifically the area between Transfer Road to the west and Beach Street to the east, and between Campbell Street to the north and Prangin Road to the south.

The major landmarks within the constituency include Chowrasta Market, Campbell Street Market and Acheen Street Mosque, all of which are within the city centre's UNESCO Site. The shopping district within the vicinity of Komtar, which includes 1st Avenue Mall, Prangin Mall and Penang Times Square, are also within the Komtar state seat.

The constituency is bounded to the north by Macalister Road, Jalan Zainal Abidin (formerly Yahudi Road), Burmah Road, Transfer Road, Campbell Street and a short section of Armenian Street, to the east by a section of Beach Street, Carnavon Street, Magazine Road and Brick Kiln Road, to the south by a short section of the Pinang River and Dato Keramat Road, and to the west by Jalan Perak.

== Demographics ==
Ethnic breakdown of Komtar's electorate as of 2023
1. Chinese (77.8%)
2. Malay (12.2%)
3. Indian (8.87%)
4. Other ethnicities (1.16%)

Total electors by polling district in 2016
Polling district	Electors
Dickens Street	1,642
Irving Road	1,227
Hong Kong Street	903
Jalan Dato' Keramat	1,044
Jalan Kim Bian Aik	1,248
Jalan Lines	1,349
Jalan Pahang	1,523
Jalan Timah	819
Kampong Kolam	906
Komtar	189
Leboh Acheh	1,156
Leboh Cintra	1,075
Leboh Melayu	1,022
Madras Lane	1,441
Total	15,544
Source: Malaysian Election Commission

== History ==
Penang State Legislative Assemblyman for Komtar
Assembly	No	Years	Member	Party
Constituency created from Kampong Kolam, Datok Keramat, Sungai Pinang and Pengkalan Kota
11th	N28	2004 – 2008	Lim Gim Soon (林锦顺)	BN (MCA)
12th	N28	2008 – 2013	Ng Wei Aik (黄伟益)	PR (DAP)
13th	N28	2013 – 2015	Teh Lai Heng (郑来兴)	PR (DAP)
13th	N28	2015 – 2018	Teh Lai Heng (郑来兴)	PH (DAP)
14th	N28	2018 – 2023	Teh Lai Heng (郑来兴)	PH (DAP)
15th	N28	2023 – present	Teh Lai Heng (郑来兴)	PH (DAP)

== Election results ==
The electoral results for the Komtar state constituency in 2008, 2013 and 2018 are as follows.

Penang state election, 2023
Party	Candidate	Votes	%	∆%
PH	Teh Lai Heng	9,279	86.61	▲2.01
PN	Cheah Kim Huat	1,435	13.39	▲13.39
Total valid votes		10,714	100.00	
Total rejected ballots		93		
Unreturned ballots		17		
Turnout		10,824	69.69	▼10.51
Registered electors		15,532		
Majority		7,844	73.22	▲3.22
PH hold		Swing		

Penang state election, 2018
Party	Candidate	Votes	%	∆%
PKR	Teh Lai Heng	10,113	84.60	▲84.60
BN	Tan Hing Teik	1,750	14.60	▼4.70
BERSAMA	Ong Chun Jiet	85	0.80	▲0.80
Total valid votes		11,948	100.00	
Total rejected ballots		98		
Unreturned ballots		13		
Turnout		12,059	80.20	▼2.60
Registered electors		15,041		
Majority		8,363	70.00	▲8.80
PKR hold		Swing		
Source(s) "His Majesty's Government Gazette - Notice of Contested Election, State Legislative Assembly for the State of Penang [P.U. (B) 252/2018]" (PDF). Attorney General's Chambers of Malaysia. 3 May 2018. "Federal Government Gazette - Results of Contested Election and Statements of the Poll after the Official Addition of Votes, State Constituencies for the State of Penang [P.U. (B) 326/2018]" (PDF). Attorney General's Chambers of Malaysia. 28 May 2018. Archived from the original (PDF) on 2019-08-29.

Penang state election, 2013
Party	Candidate	Votes	%	∆%
DAP	Teh Lai Heng	10,669	80.50	▲16.50
BN	Loh Chye Teik	2,555	19.30	▼16.70
Love Malaysia Party	Liew Yeow Hooi	25	0.20	▲0.20
Total valid votes		13,249	100.00	
Total rejected ballots		107		
Unreturned ballots		8		
Turnout		13,364	82.80	▲11.30
Registered electors		16,132		
Majority		8,114	61.20	▲33.20
DAP hold		Swing		
Source(s) "Federal Government Gazette - Notice of Contested Election, State Legislative Assembly for the State of Penang [P.U. (B) 189/2013]" (PDF). Attorney General's Chambers of Malaysia. 26 April 2013. "Federal Government Gazette - Results of Contested Election and Statements of the Poll after the Official Addition of Votes, State Constituencies for the State of Penang [P.U. (B) 230/2013]" (PDF). Attorney General's Chambers of Malaysia. 22 May 2013. Archived from the original (PDF) on 2019-03-22.

Penang state election, 2008
Party	Candidate	Votes	%	∆%
DAP	Ng Wei Aik	7,610	64.00	▲26.03
BN	Lim Gim Soon	4,282	36.00	▼26.03
Total valid votes		11,182	100.00	
Total rejected ballots		203		
Unreturned ballots		40		
Turnout		12,135	71.50	
Registered electors		16,976		
Majority		3,328	28.00	▲3.94
DAP gain from BN		Swing		?

Penang state election, 2004
Party	Candidate	Votes	%
BN	Lim Gim Soon	7,732	62.03
DAP	Teh Lai Heng	4,732	37.97
Total valid votes		12,464	100.00
Total rejected ballots		222	
Unreturned ballots		0	
Turnout		12,686	67.45
Registered electors		18,809	
Majority		3,000	24.06
This is a new created constituency

== See also ==
- Constituencies of Penang
