= Sia Boey Urban Archaeological Park =

Urban park in George Town, Penang, Malaysia

- Taman Bandar Arkeologi Sia Boey
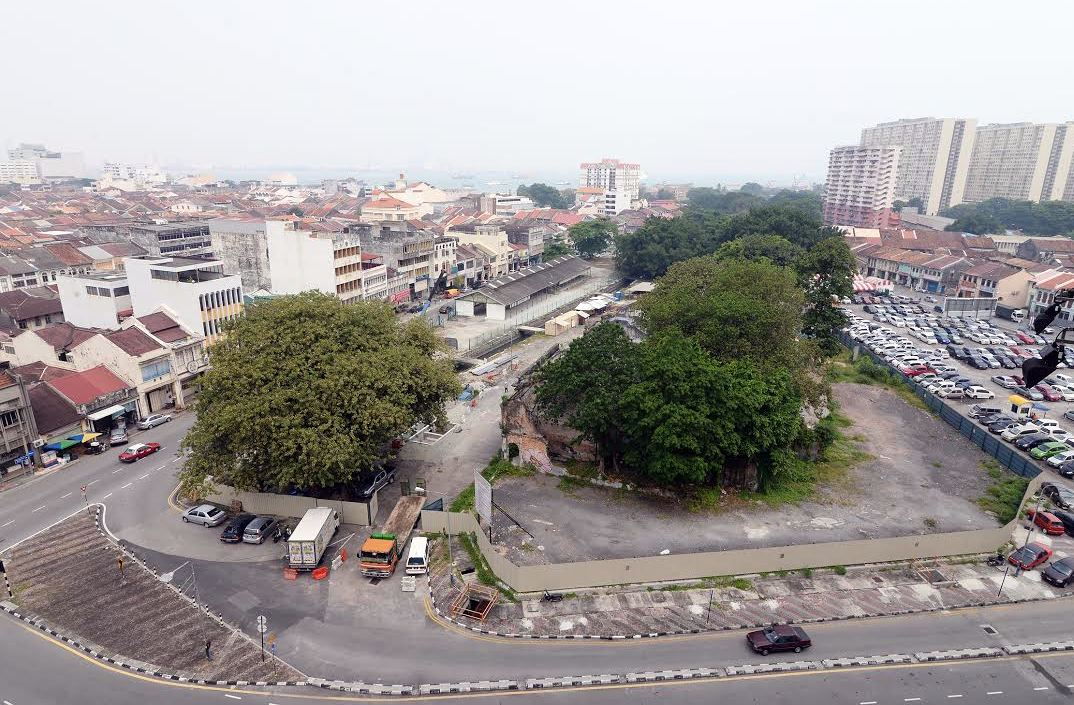
- Interactive map of Sia Boey Urban Archaeological Park
- Type: Urban park
- Location: 50, Prangin Road, George Town, Penang, Malaysia
- Coordinates: 5°24′45″N 100°20′01″E
- Created: November 9, 2019
- Operator: Penang Development Corporation
- Open: Daily 6 a.m. to 11 p.m.
- Public transit: Future Bayan Lepas line's Komtar Station

The Sia Boey Urban Archaeological Park, also colloquially known as the Sia Boey, is an urban archaeology park within the city of George Town in the Malaysian state of Penang. Located at Prangin Road, it is touted as the first Urban Archaeological Park in the country.

The Sia Boey Urban Archaeological Park contains various recreational amenities, such as a koi fish-filled revitalised Prangin Canal, aged-old trees and a playground for the kids, all of which are open to the public. The park is maintained by the Penang Development Corporation. The cost of diverting and restoring the old canal, as well as the construction of the new canal and "archaeological" works, was RM9.1 million ringgit, while the Old Prangin Market was being restored at a cost of RM5.1 million.

== History ==
With operations concentrated around the Prangin Canal, the 19th-century market hall, and the shophouses, "Sia Boey" was an early trading area in George Town. "Sia Boey" in Hokkien (Chinese: 社尾; Tâi-lô: Siā-bué) and "Ujong Pasir" in Malay both mean "end of the town". Sia Boey has long been a hub for community participation, a place where people can connect and socialise. The Hokkien community established an urban settlement around the Canal in the mid-1880s, with a lively market hall in the centre and shophouses surrounding it, while the thriving trading sector also included Malays, Indians and Acehnese.

Following the relocation of the Sia Boey Market to Macallum Street Ghaut in early 2000s, the site was earmarked for a while as Penang Island's transit hub. This grew into the Komtar LRT Station, which was originally planned to be built on top of the idle market building, but because to local resistance, the station was moved to Magazine Road instead, saving the heritage structure from demolition.

In October 2015, the Centre for Global Archaeological Research, University of Science Malaysia, discovered a granite construction that was eventually identified as the Old Prangin Canal Basin. Penang Development Corporation, as the project owner, and George Town World Heritage Incorporated, as the project partner, were motivated by the archaeological potential of these discoveries to develop the site into Malaysia's first Urban Archaeological Park.

In February 2018, the Technical Review Panel (TRP) approved the rejuvenation after hearing the plans. Following the completion of the diversion in October 2016, the Sia Boey Rejuvenation Project was officially kickstarted on March 25, 2018, the rehabilitation took undertaken from May to August 2018, with the goal of transforming Sia Boey into a place where development and historical conservation can coexist. Penang's Chief Minister Chow Kon Yeow officially opened the country's first Urban Archeological Park on 9 November 2019.

The Sia Boey Urban Archeological Park adds to the UNESCO World Heritage Site of George Town. It adds to the great universal value by providing programming and space for local residents, as well as repairing shophouses and embodying the cohabitation of heritage conservation, cultural heritage education, urban greenery, and sustainable development.

== Gallery ==
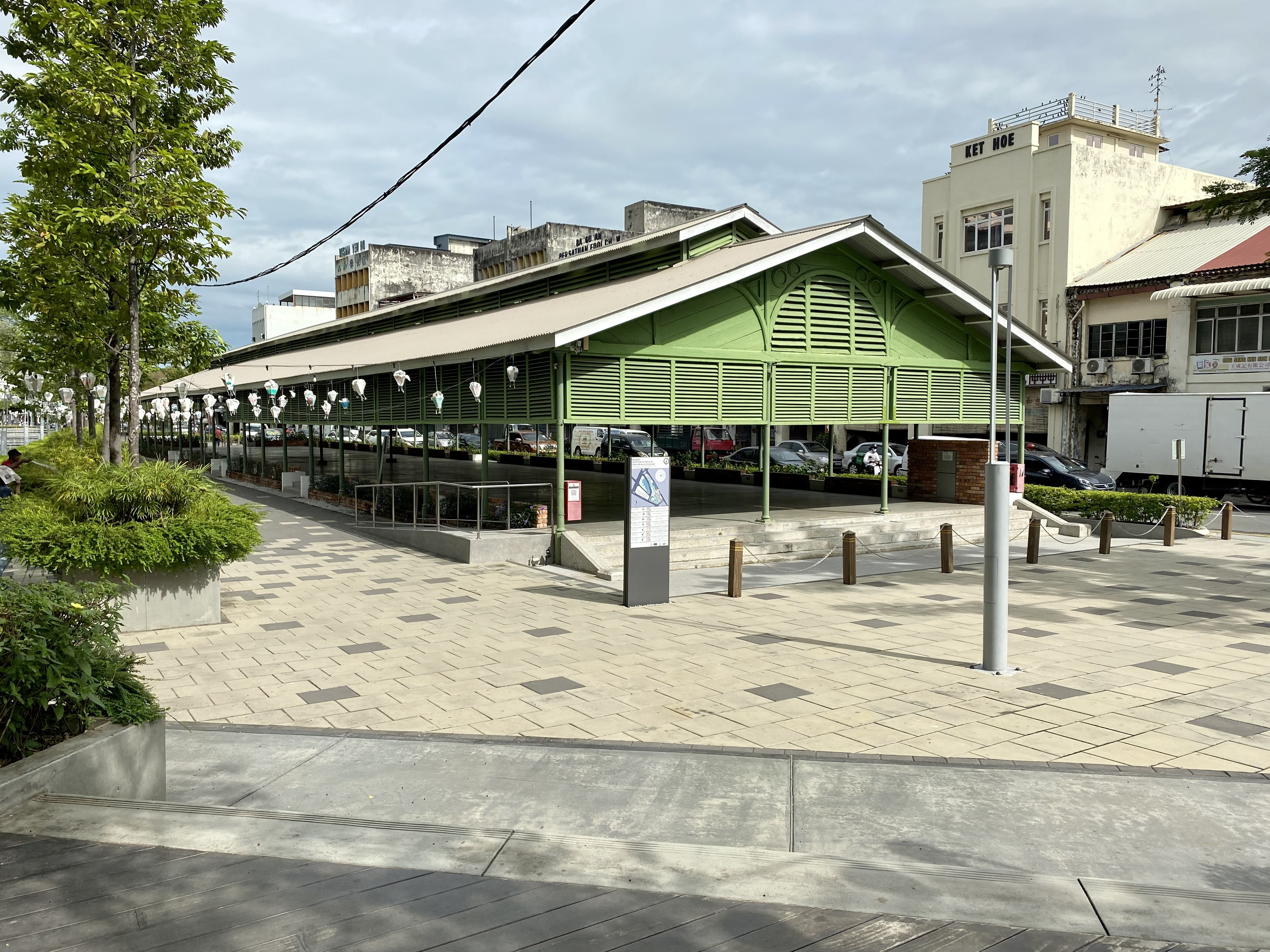

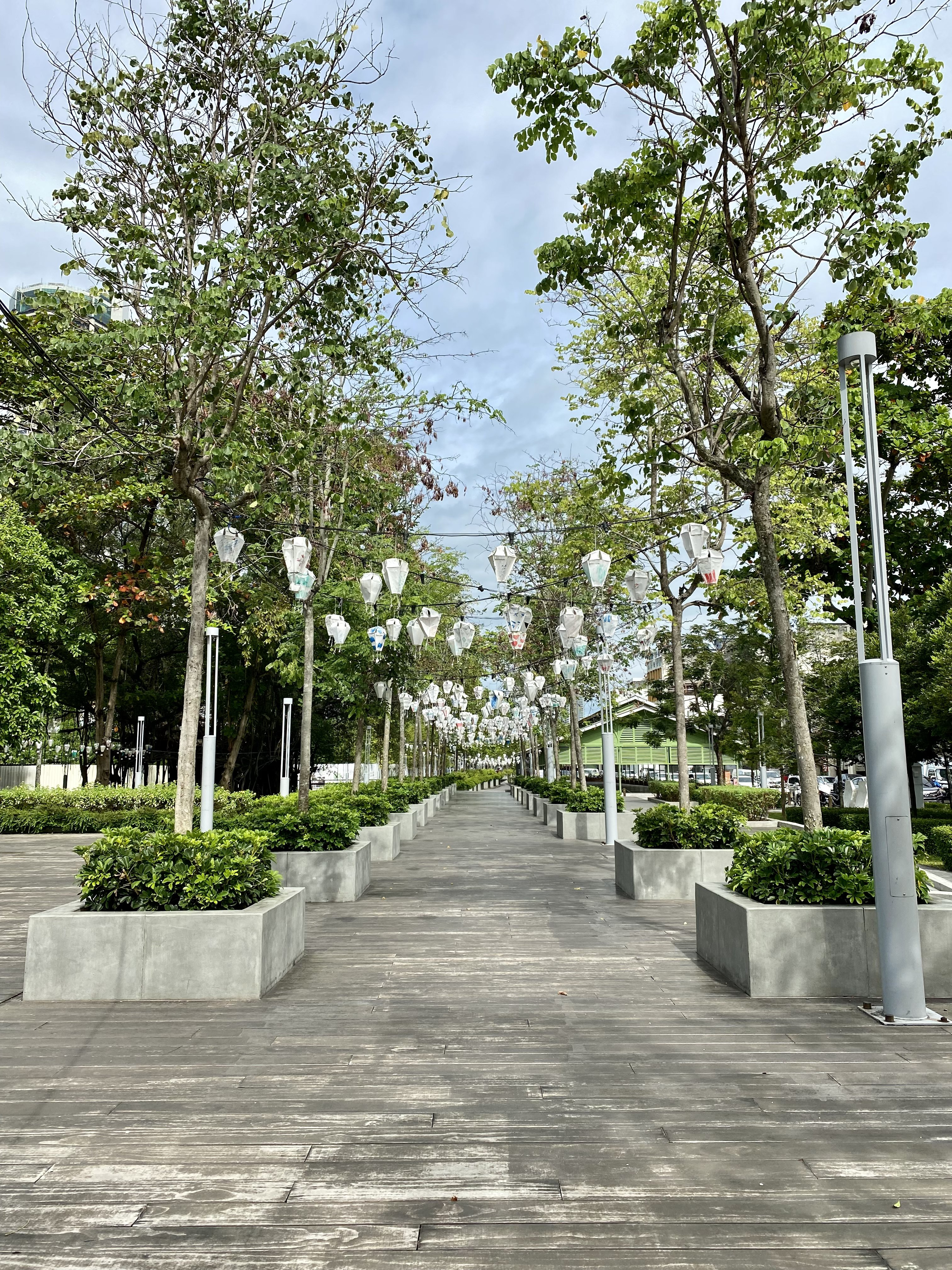

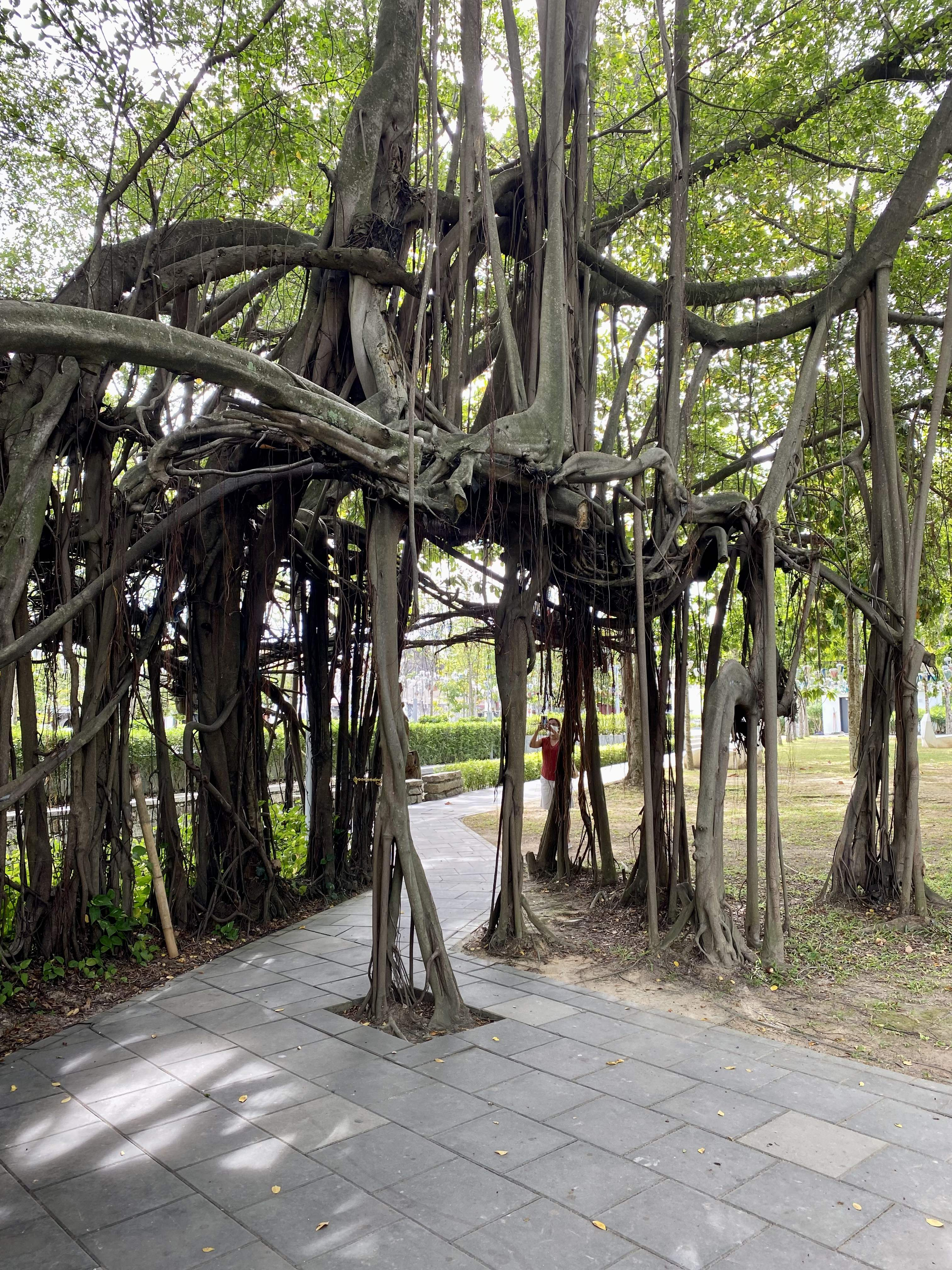

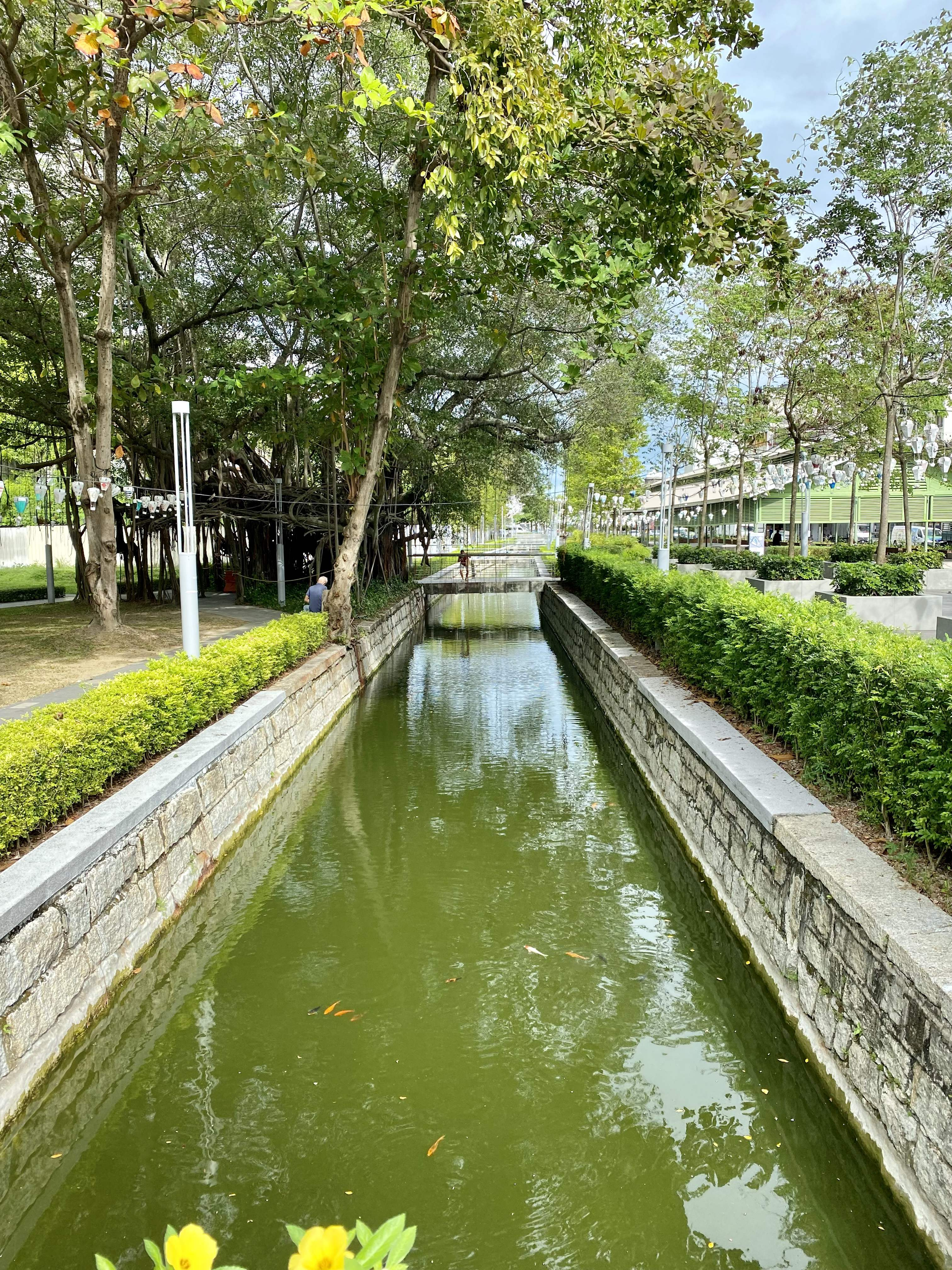

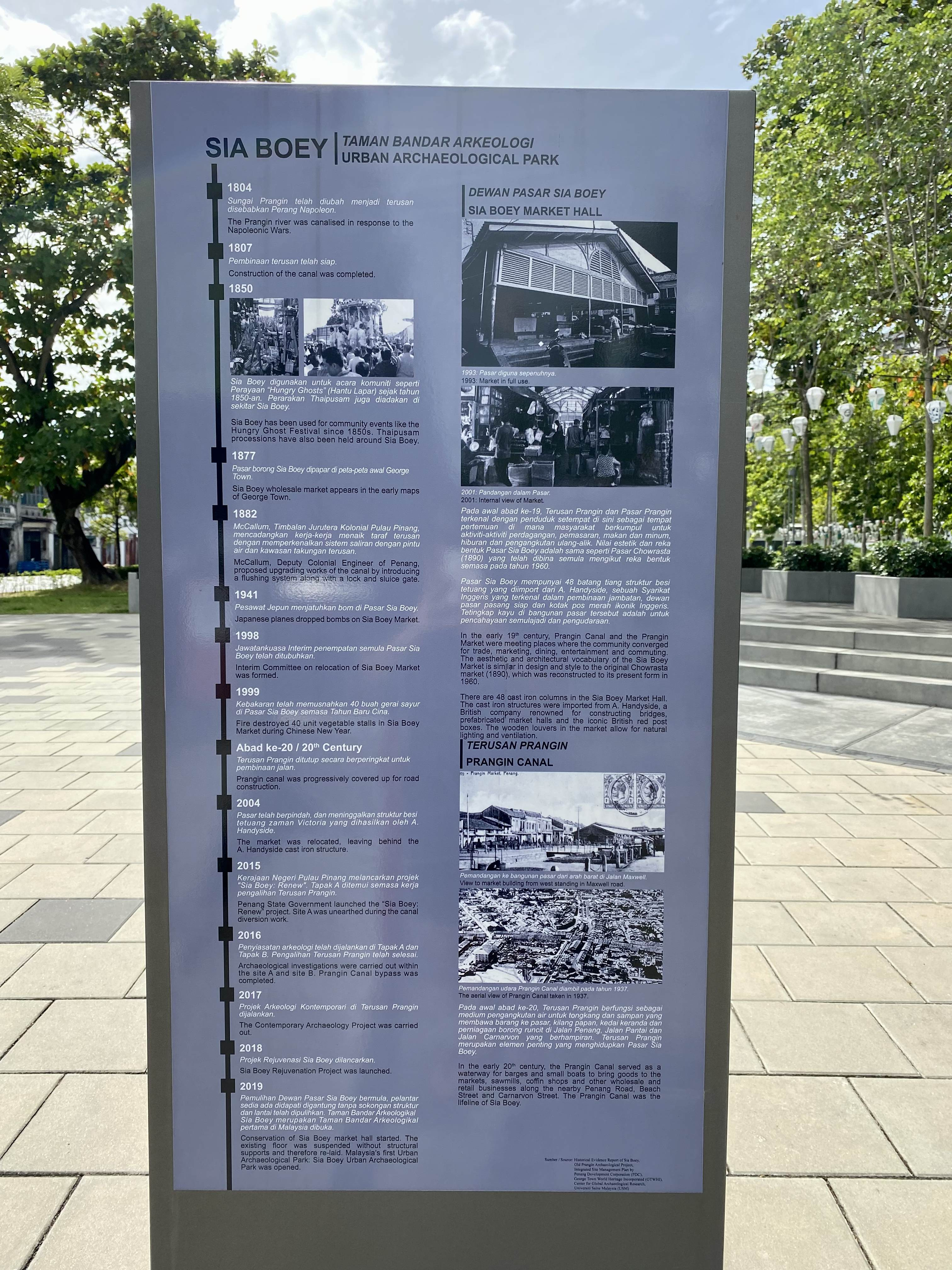

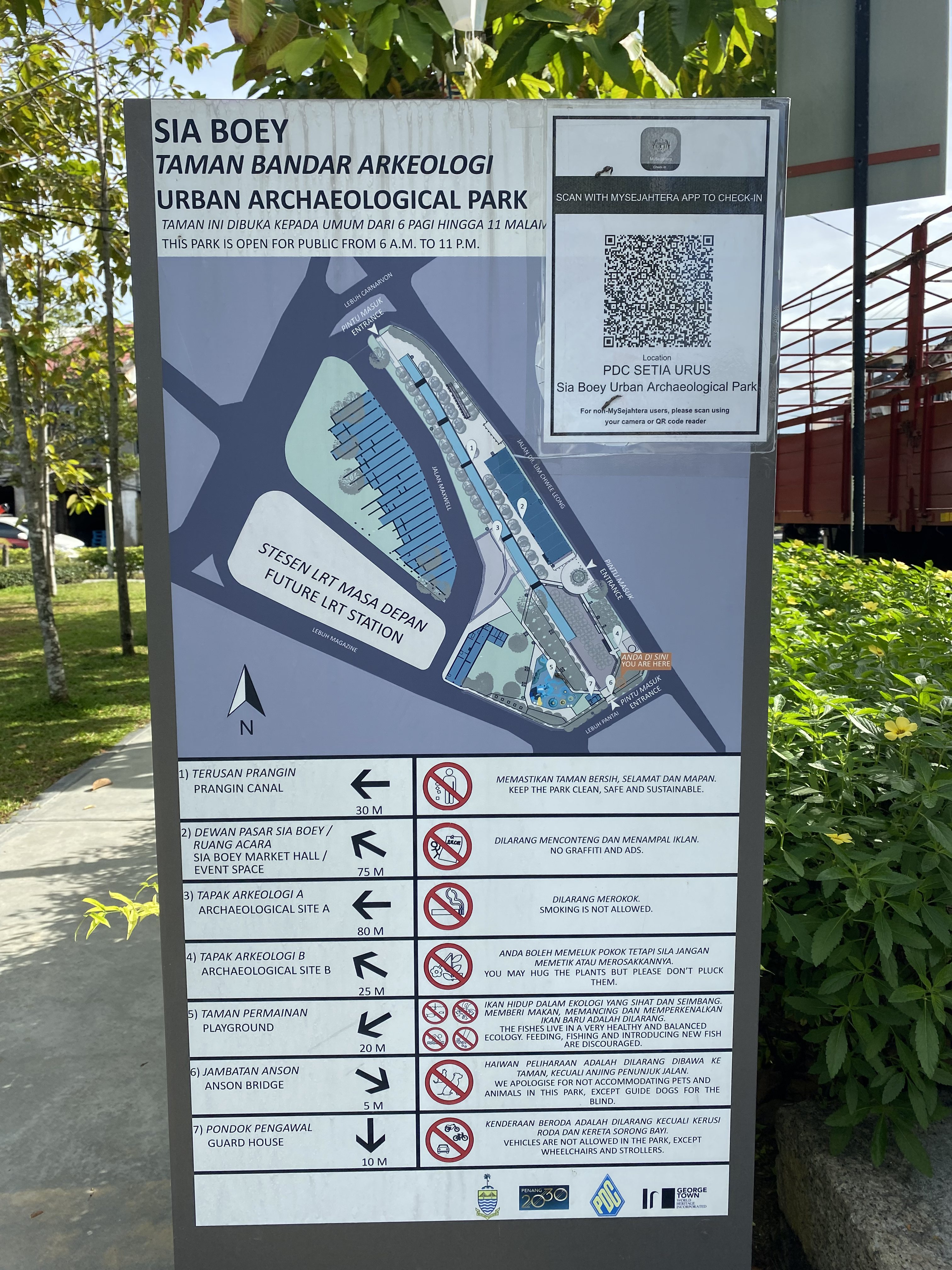
