= Teh Lai Heng =

Malaysian politician

Yang Berhormat Tuan Teh Lai Heng MLA
- 郑来兴
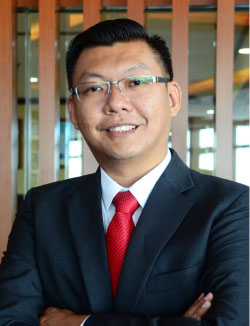

Member of the Penang State Legislative Assembly for Komtar
- Incumbent
- Assumed office 5 May 2013
- Preceded by: Ng Wei Aik (PR–DAP)
- Majority: 8,114 (2013); 8,363 (2018); 7,844 (2023)

Personal details
- Born: Teh Lai Heng Malaysia
- Citizenship: Malaysian
- Party: Democratic Action Party (DAP)
- Other political affiliations: Pakatan Rakyat (PR) (2018–2015); Pakatan Harapan (PH) (since 2015)
- Children: 3
- Education: Universiti Sains Malaysia
- Occupation: Politician

Teh Lai Heng (Chinese: 郑来兴; Pe̍h-ōe-jī: Tēⁿ Lâi-heng) is a Malaysian politician who has served as Member of the Penang State Legislative Assembly (MLA) for Komtar since May 2013. He is a member of the Democratic Action Party (DAP), a component party of the Pakatan Harapan (PH) and formerly Pakatan Rakyat (PR) coalitions.

He currently serves as the Treasurer of DAP Penang State and the Secretary of DAP Tanjong PLC.

== Education ==
Teh received his early education at SMJK Jit Sin and later pursued tertiary studies at Tunku Abdul Rahman College (TARC), Penang. In 2022, he obtained a Master’s Degree in Public Administration （MPA） from Universiti Sains Malaysia (USM).

== Political career ==
Teh made his electoral debut in the 2004 Malaysian general election, contesting the newly created N.28 Komtar State Constituency (formerly known as Kampung Kolam). Running under the DAP, he lost to Dato. Lim Gim Soon from MCA, receiving 4,732 votes against Lim’s 7,732.

In 2008, Teh was appointed as the Special Officer to Chow Kon Yeow, who was then the Penang DAP Chairman and State Executive Councillor. In 2011, he was further appointed as a Councillor for the Penang Island Municipal Council (MPPP) and served concurrently as Political Secretary to Chow Kon Yeow.

In the 13th Malaysian General Election in 2013, Teh was fielded by DAP to contest the Komtar seat once again. This time, he won decisively, defeating MCA's Loh Chye Teik with a majority of 8,114 votes, securing the seat for DAP.

In the 14th Malaysian General Election in 2018, Teh successfully defended the Komtar state seat. Following Pakatan Harapan's victory in forming the Penang state government, he was appointed as the Political Secretary to the Chief Minister of Penang, YAB Chow Kon Yeow.

== Election results ==
Penang State Legislative Assembly
Year	Constituency	Candidate	Votes	Pct.	Opponent(s)	Votes	Pct.	Ballots cast	Majority	Turnout
2004	N28 Komtar	Teh Lai Heng (DAP)	4,732	37.97%	Lim Gim Soon (MCA)	7,732	62.03%	12,686	3,000	67.45%
2013	N28 Komtar	Teh Lai Heng (DAP)	10,669	80.50%	Loh Chye Teik (MCA)	2,555	19.30%	13,364	8,114	82.80%
2013	N28 Komtar	Teh Lai Heng (DAP)	10,669	80.50%	Liew Yeow Hooi (PCM)	25	0.20%	13,364	8,114	82.80%
2018	N28 Komtar	Teh Lai Heng (DAP)	10,113	84.60%	Tan Hing Teik (MCA)	1,750	14.60%	12,059	8,363	80.20%
2018	N28 Komtar	Teh Lai Heng (DAP)	10,113	84.60%	Ong Chun Jiet (MUP)	85	0.80%	12,059	8,363	80.20%
2023	N28 Komtar	Teh Lai Heng (DAP)	9,279	86.61%	Cheah Kim Huat (BERSATU)	1,435	13.39%	10,824	7,844	69.69%
