= Ng Wei Aik =

Malaysian politician

- 黄伟益

Member of the Malaysian Parliament for Tanjong
- In office 5 March 2013 – 9 May 2018
- Preceded by: Chow Kon Yeow (PR–DAP)
- Succeeded by: Chow Kon Yeow (PH–DAP)
- Majority: 28,645 (2013)

Member of the Penang State Assembly for Komtar
- In office 8 March 2008 – 5 March 2013
- Preceded by: Lim Gim Soon (BN–MCA)
- Succeeded by: Teh Lai Heng (PR–DAP)
- Majority: 3,328 (2008)

Personal details
- Born: Ng Wei Aik; 20 December 1977 (age 48) George Town, Penang, Malaysia
- Citizenship: Malaysian
- Party: Democratic Action Party (DAP)
- Other political affiliations: Pakatan Harapan (PH); Pakatan Rakyat (PR)
- Education: University of Malaya
- Occupation: Politician
- Website: ngweiaik.com

Ng Wei Aik (simplified Chinese: 黄伟益; traditional Chinese: 黃偉益; Pe̍h-ōe-jī: N̂g Uí-e̍k; pinyin: Huáng Wěiyì; born 20 December 1977) is a Malaysian politician of Chinese origin. He is the former Member of Parliament for Tanjong parliamentary constituency for one term from 2013 to 2018, representing Democratic Action Party (DAP), a component of Pakatan Harapan (PH) coalition.

Ng was also the Penang State Assemblyman of Komtar seat for one term from 2008 to 2013.

Ng was dropped by DAP as a candidate in the 2018 general election.

He was also the former political secretary of Lim Guan Eng, chief minister of Penang but he resigned the post in March 2014 to focus on his job as member of parliament.

== Election results ==
Penang State Legislative Assembly
Year	Constituency	Candidate	Votes	Pct	Opponent(s)	Votes	Pct	Ballots cast	Majority	Turnout
2008	N28 Komtar	Ng Wei Aik (DAP)	7,610	62.71%	Lim Gim Soon (MCA)	4,282	35.29%	12,135	3.328	71.48%

Parliament of Malaysia
Year	Constituency	Candidate	Votes	Pct	Opponent(s)	Votes	Pct	Ballots cast	Majority	Turnout
2013	P049 Tanjong	Ng Wei Aik (DAP)	35,510	83.80%	Ng Song Kheng (Gerakan)	6,865	16.20%	42,903	28,645	83.33%
