= Prangin Mall =

Shopping mall in George Town, Penang, Malaysia

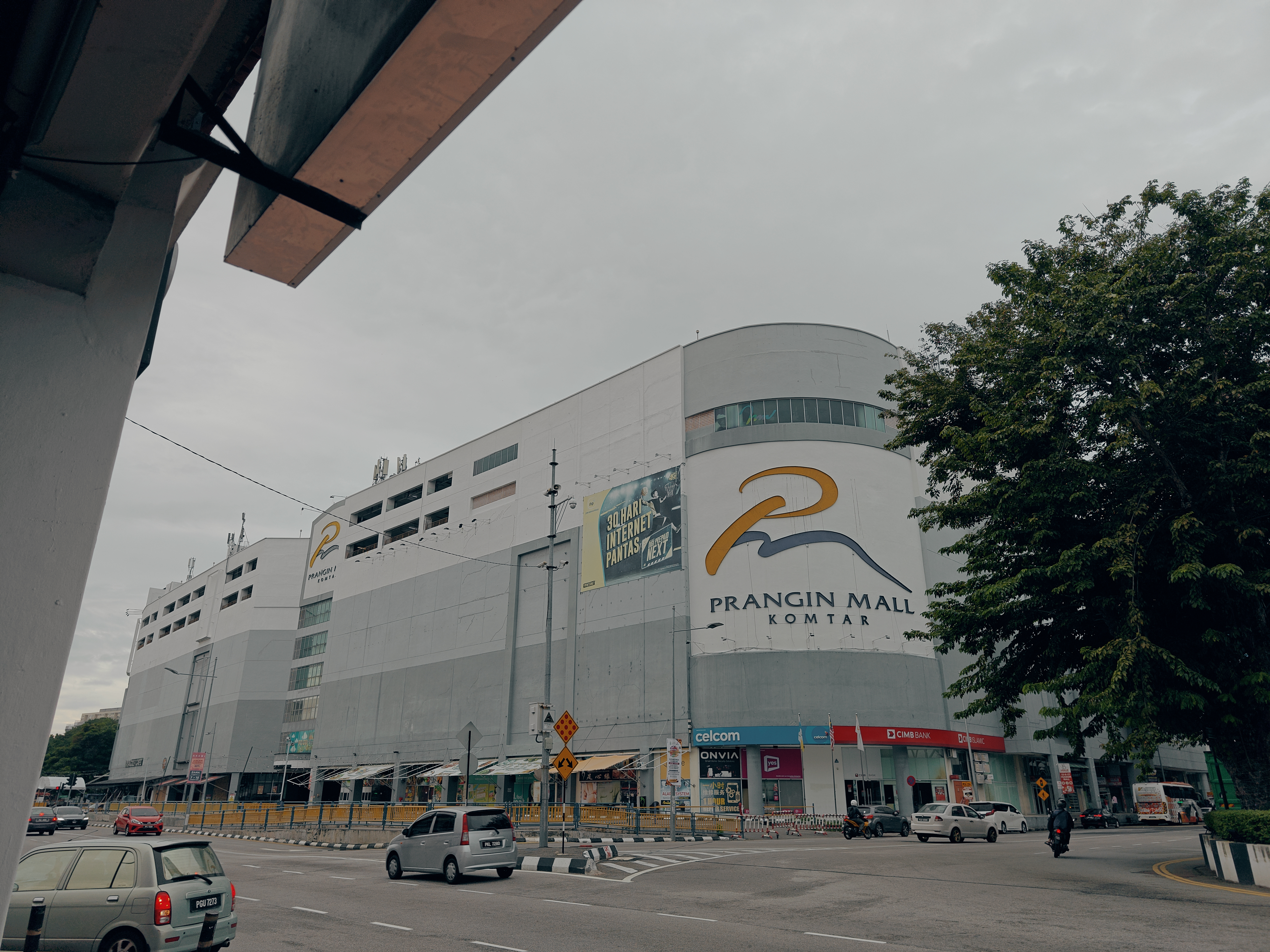
- Location: George Town, Penang, Malaysia
- Coordinates: 5.4148°N 100.3314°E
- Address: Prangin Mall, No 33, Jalan Dr Lim Chwee Leong, 10100 Penang, Malaysia
- Opened: 2001; 25 years ago
- Num. of stores: 613
- Floors: 6
- Parking: 1,600
- Website: prangin-mall.com

Prangin Mall is a shopping mall within George Town in the Malaysian state of Penang. It is located at Prangin Road within the city's Central Business District (CBD), next to Komtar Tower, and is linked to both Komtar and neighboring 1st Avenue Mall via overhead skybridges.

The mall was opened to the public in 2001 as Phase 3 of the Komtar project. The shopping mall faces competition from the newer 1st Avenue Mall, and today, Prangin Mall caters mainly to lower-income and middle-income earners. To add on, Parkson, its main anchor tenant, has closed its outlet within the mall. It has a total of six floors, including a sub-basement level.

== Retail outlets ==
Atrium of Prangin Mall in September 2023

Atrium stage preparation for Mooncake festival

Prangin Mall's main anchor tenant was Parkson, which closed due to a slow decrease in the number of shoppers and the increased preference of shopping in the former Parkson 1st Avenue outlet, resulting in high competition.

In addition, Prangin Mall has emerged as a major electronic retail centre in George Town, with several outlets offering various electronic gadgets at lower prices.

The mall has managed to retain its lower-income to middle-income customers due to the large number of cheaply-priced local retail shops. There are also a number of fashion brands, such as Body Glove and Giordano.

The eateries within the mall include Starbucks, Pizza Hut, KFC, McDonald's and Burger King.

== Entertainment ==
A cinema and a handful of other entertainment options are sited within the top floor of Prangin Mall. These include a kids' indoor playground, arcades and a new bowling alley.

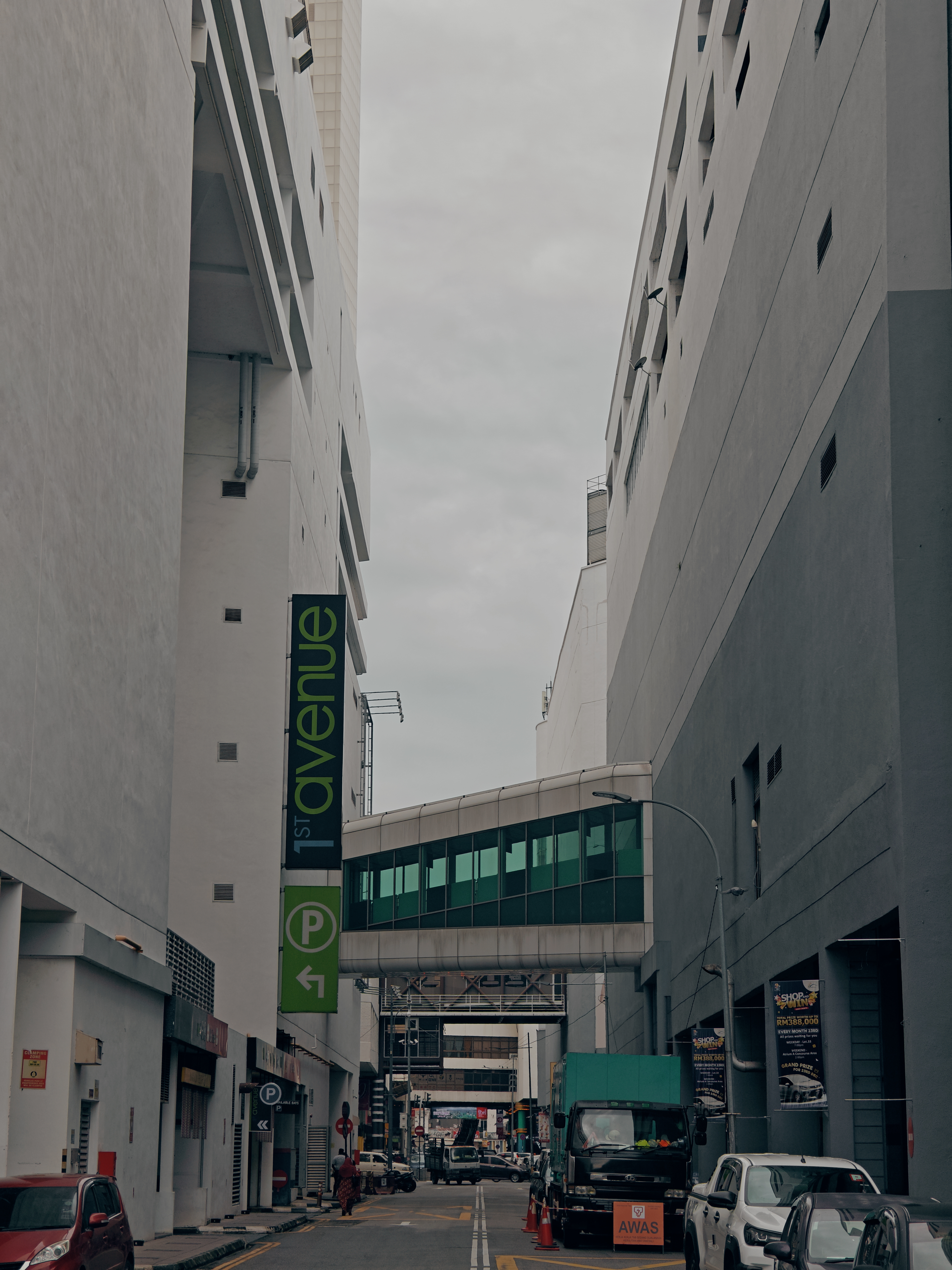
The overhead pedestrian bridge linking Prangin Mall with 1st Avenue Mall above Tek Soon Street

== Location ==
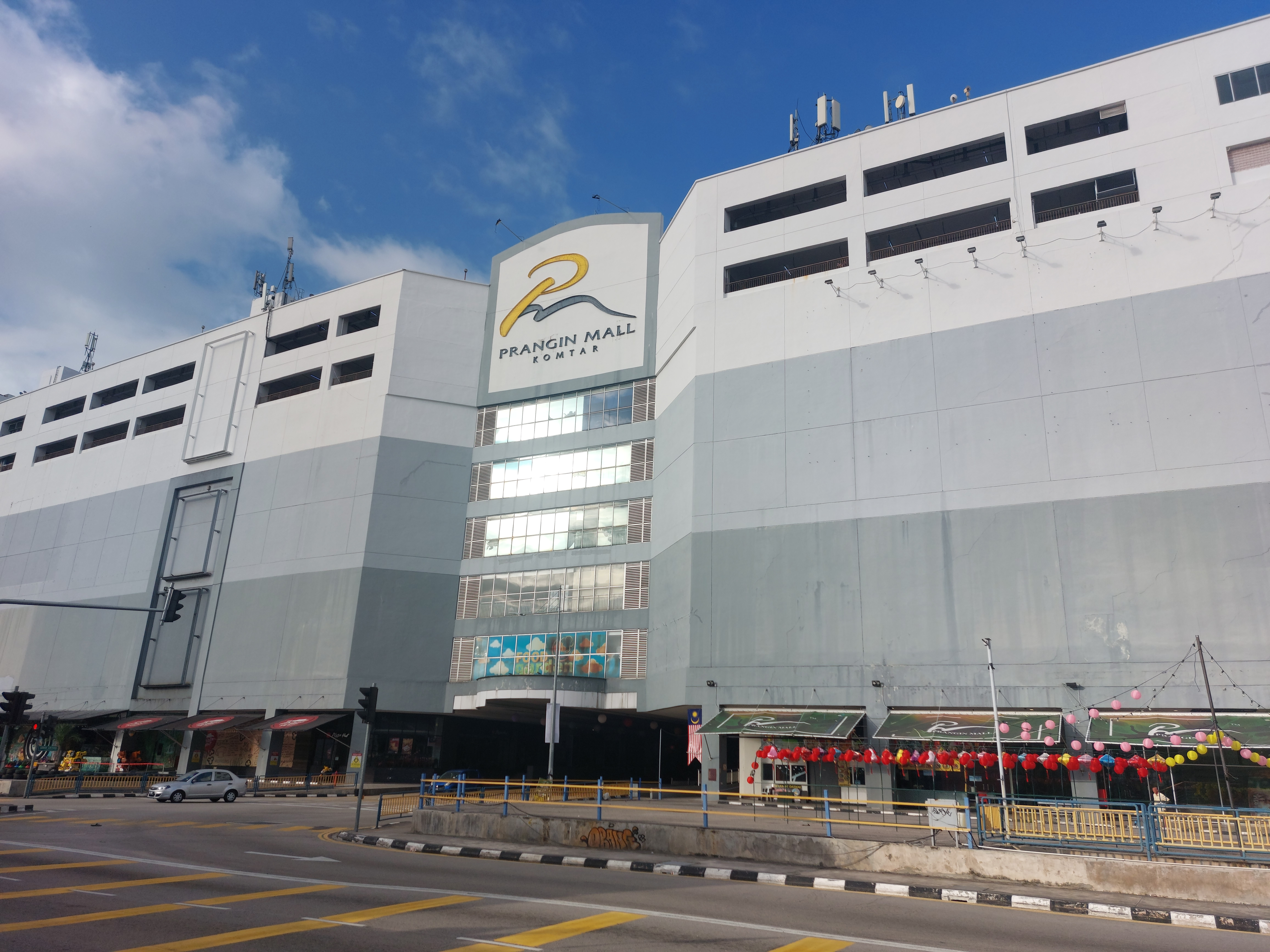
Front façade as seen from Prangin Road

Prangin Mall is situated in the centre of George Town, along Prangin Road (now Jalan Dr Lim Chwee Leong) between Komtar and 1st Avenue Mall. In fact, Prangin Mall was named after Prangin Road, which, in turn, was the name of the canal that once existed here.

== Transport ==
Prangin Mall's location at the heart of George Town, right next to the Rapid Penang bus terminal in Komtar, makes it easily accessible to locals and tourists alike. One can take the free-of-charge Rapid Penang CAT bus from anywhere within George Town's UNESCO World Heritage Site to get to Prangin Mall. As most Rapid Penang bus routes on Penang Island pass through the Komtar Bus Terminal, Prangin Mall can also be reached via any Rapid Penang bus heading to Komtar.

== See also ==
- List of shopping malls in Malaysia
