= Prangin Road, George Town =

Road in the Malaysian state of Penang

Prangin Road
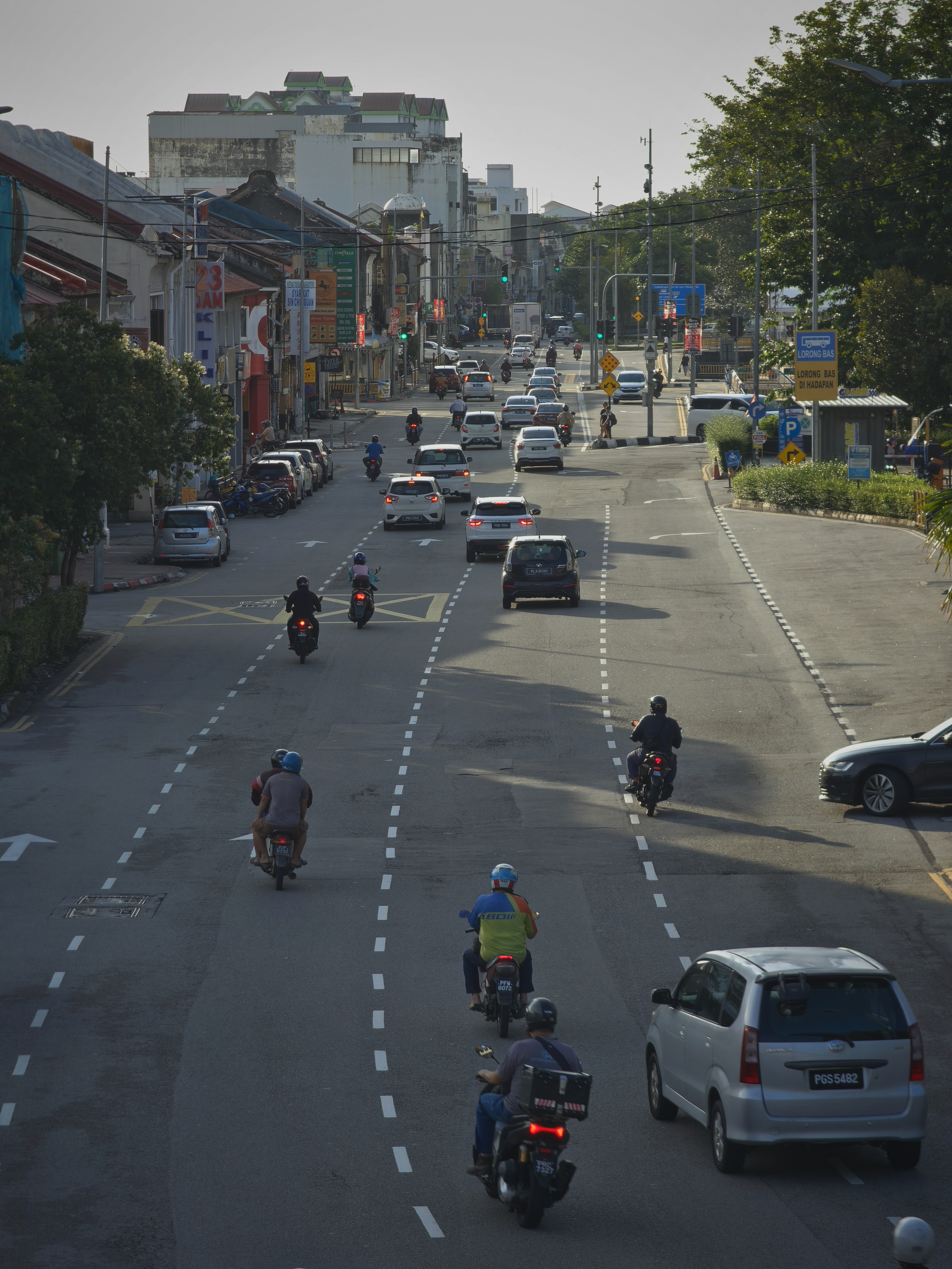
- Native name: Malay: Jalan Dr Lim Chwee Leong; Chinese: 港仔墘（林萃龙医生路）
- Maintained by: Penang Island City Council
- Location: George Town
- Coordinates: 5.415564°N 100.331444°E
- West end: Penang Road
- East end: Beach Street

Construction
- Inauguration: 19th century
- JALAN DR LIM CHWEE LEONG Prangin Rd10100 P. PINANG

UNESCO World Heritage Site
- Type: Cultural
- Criteria: ii, iii, iv
- Designated: 2008 (32nd session)
- Part of: George Town UNESCO Buffer Zone
- Reference no.: 1223
- Region: Asia-Pacific

Prangin Road is a major thoroughfare in the city of George Town within the Malaysian state of Penang. The one-way road, one of the busiest in the city centre, forms the southernmost limit of the city's UNESCO World Heritage Site and runs along major landmarks such as Komtar and Prangin Mall.

Prangin Road was named after a canal that once ran through the area. For much of the 19th century, the Prangin Canal marked the southernmost limits of George Town. The canal has since been disused, while the construction of Komtar in the 1970s heralded more modern forms of urbanisation along Prangin Road.

== Etymology ==
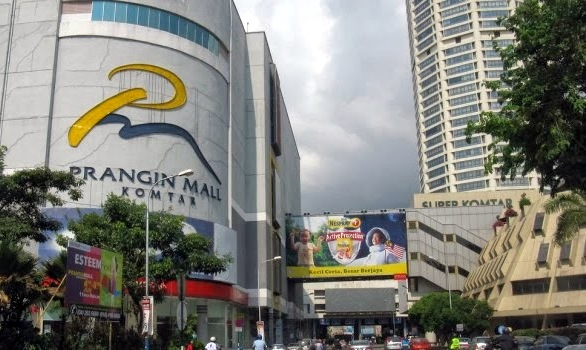
Prangin Mall (left) and Komtar (right), as seen from Prangin Road.

Prangin Road was named after the Prangin Canal, a two-metre wide waterway that once existed in the area. The canal ran along the road and into the sea, enabling sampans and small boats to ship in goods from larger vessels anchored in the Penang Straits, as well as agricultural produce from the interior of Penang Island downstream.

Prangin Road was renamed Jalan Dr Lim Chwee Leong in honour of the father of Lim Chong Eu, the second Chief Minister of Penang. Lim Chwee Leong, who hailed from Singapore, moved to George Town during the early 20th century and subsequently set up his dispensary at the road. Nonetheless, local Penangites continue to refer to the road by its colonial name, Prangin Road. This reflects a strong conservatism among the locals, who view Penang's colonial history as part of their local identity.

== History ==
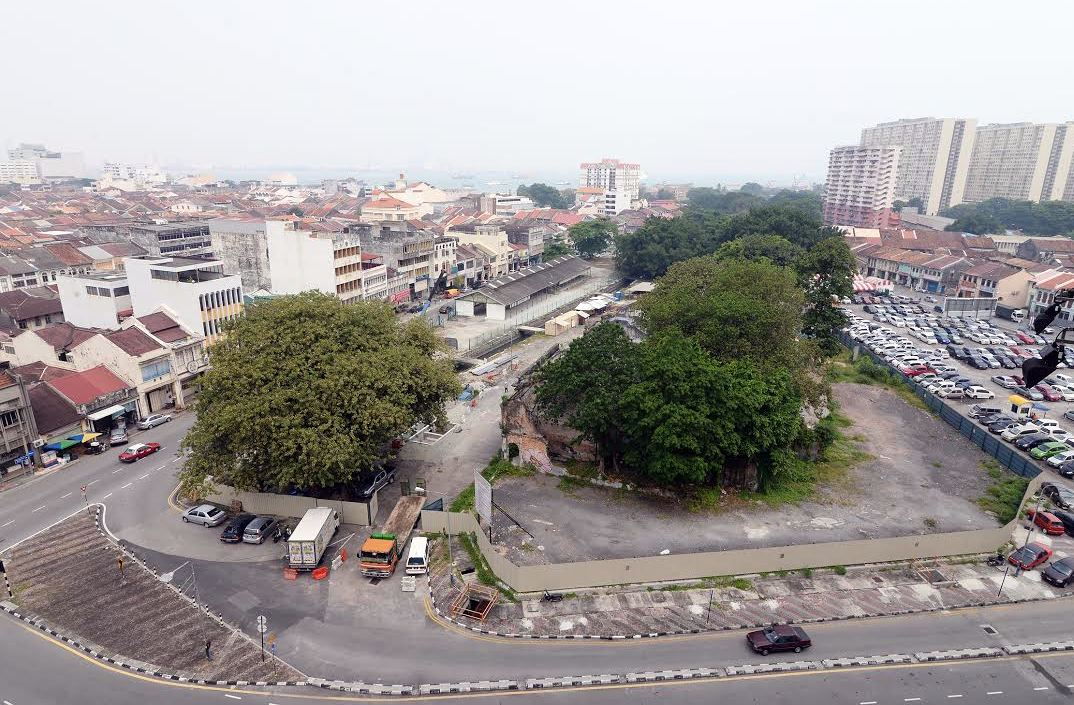
Sia Boey Market was a wet market adjacent to the Prangin Canal. The site had been rejunivated into an urban archaeological park opened in 2019.

It is believed that Prangin Road was created sometime in the 19th century. As the Prangin Canal facilitated the transportation of goods from the sea and the interior, a wet market, known as 'Sia Boey' in Penang Hokkien, was later built along the road. The term 'Sia Boey' meant the end of the town, and indeed, for much of the 19th century, Prangin Road marked the southernmost boundary of George Town.

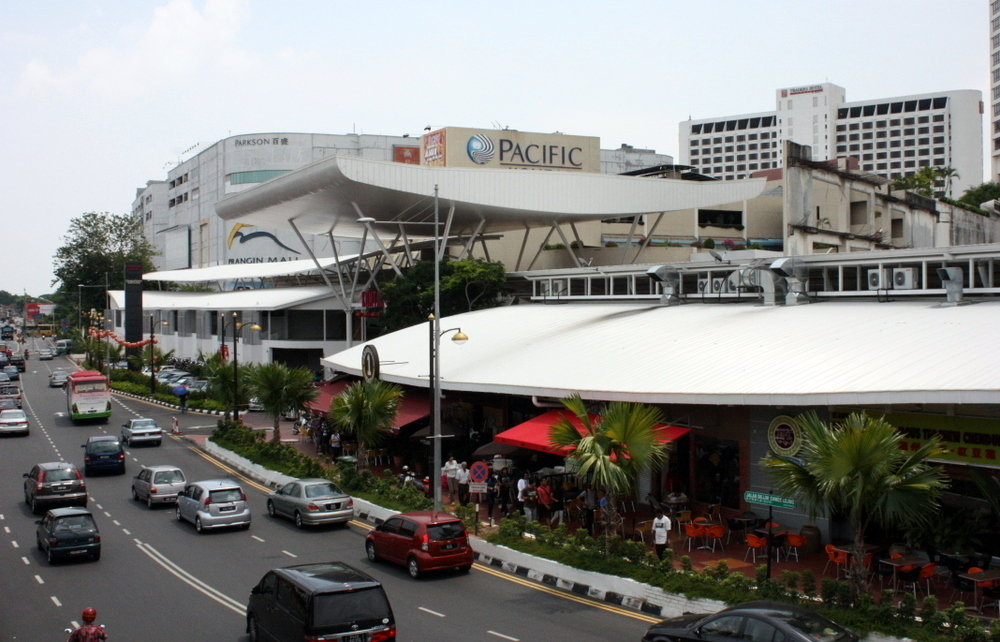
Komtar Walk is a stretch of food outlets along Prangin Road. The southern side of the road (seen here) is also outside the city's UNESCO Site.

Prangin Canal remained in use until the 1950s. However, the advent of motorised vehicles, as well as more modern forms of urbanisation, began to threaten the existence of both the canal and the Sia Boey Market. By the 1970s, much of the canal was covered up; the canal had become no more than a large ditch. Concurrently, the construction of Komtar spelled the end of the Sia Boey Market, which has since been relocated east to Macallum Street Ghaut.

The road was renamed after Lim Chwee Leong in the 1980s.

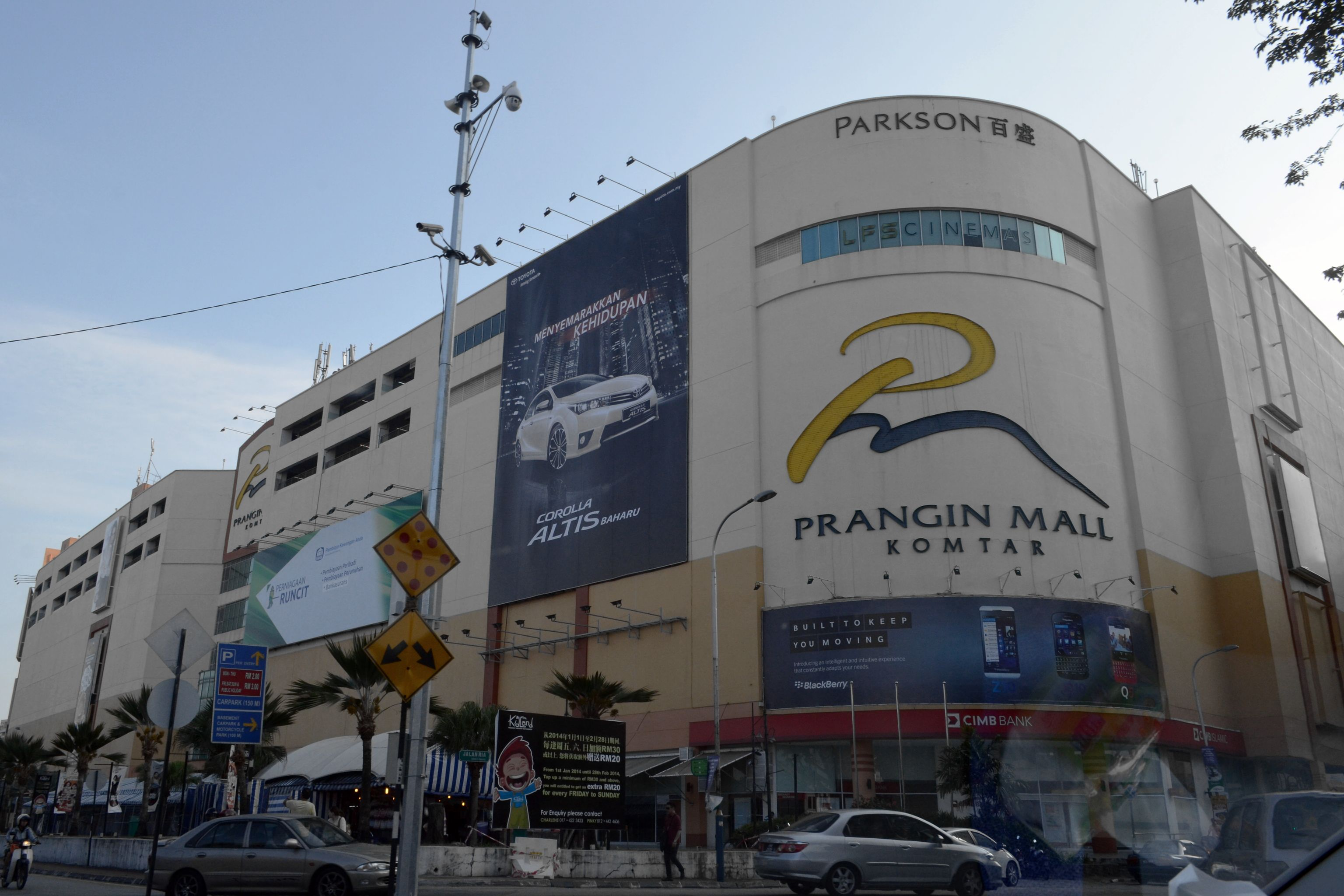
Prangin Mall

== Landmarks ==
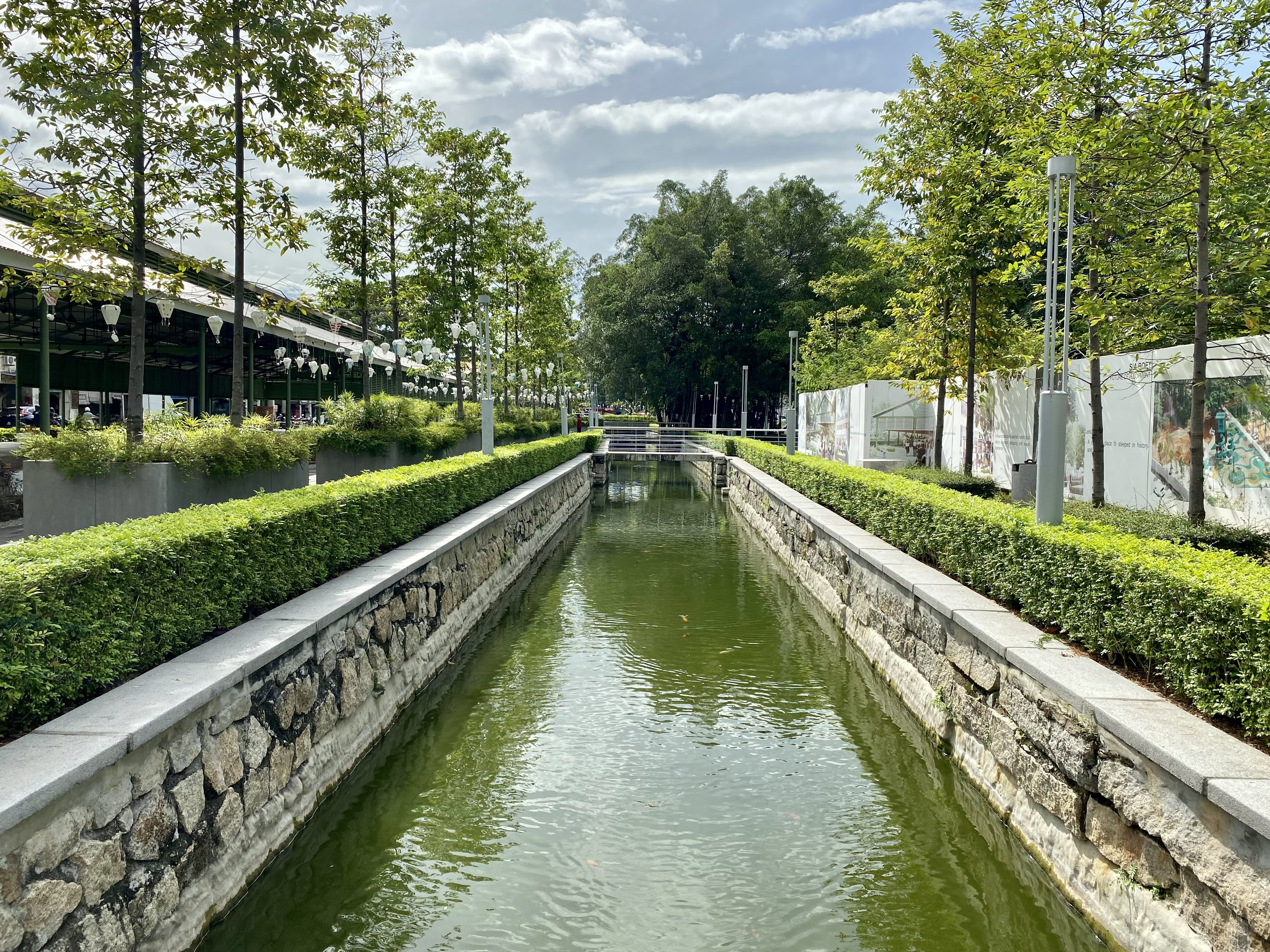
Prangin Canal in the Sia Boey Urban Archaeological Park

- Komtar
- Prangin Mall
- Sia Boey Urban Archaeological Park

== See also ==
- List of roads in George Town
