= 1st Avenue Mall =

Shopping mall in George Town, Penang, Malaysia

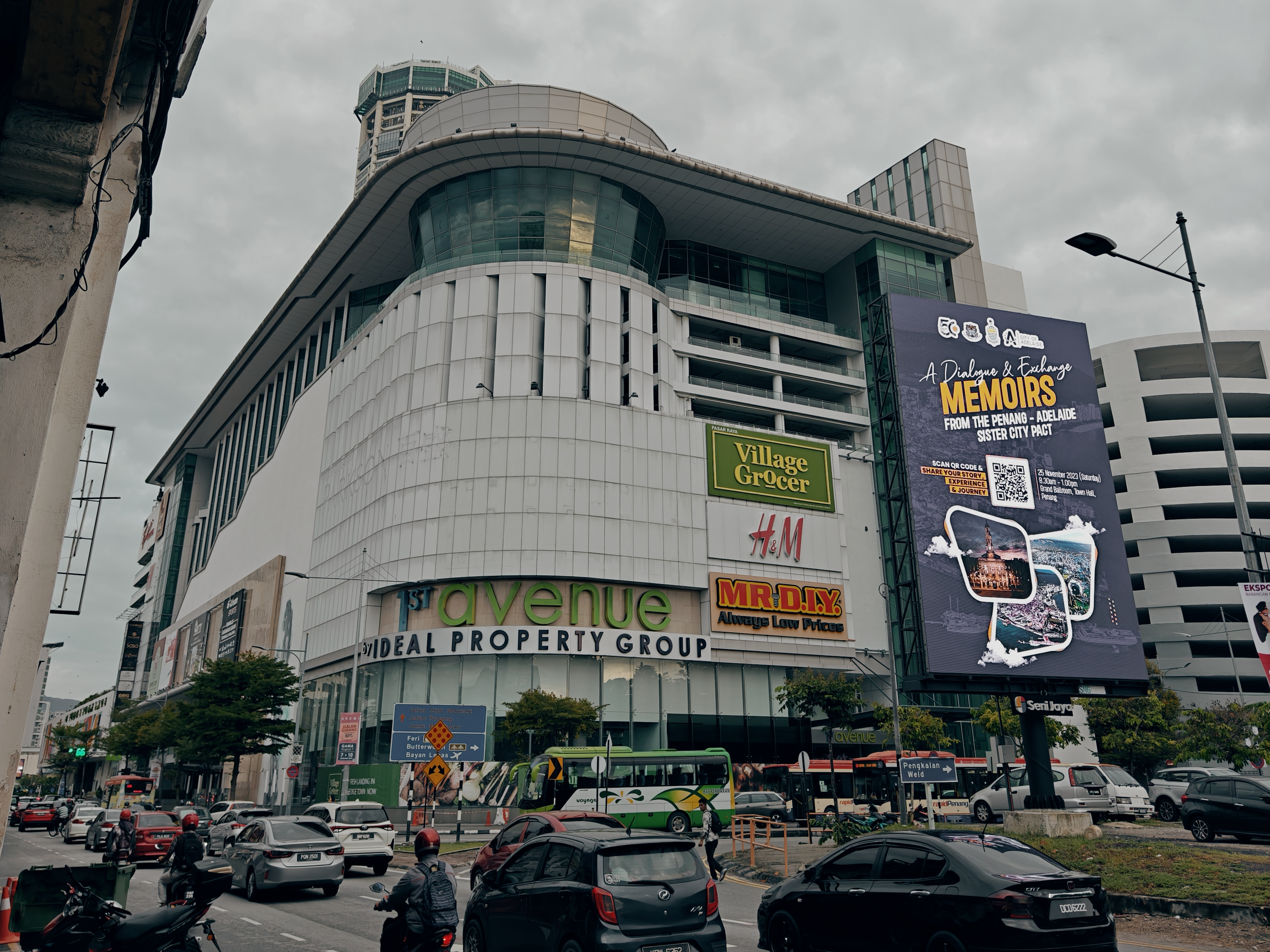
- Location: George Town, Penang, Malaysia
- Coordinates: 5.413076°N 100.330967°E
- Opened: November 2010
- Owner: 1st Avenue Mall Sdn Bhd
- Num. of anchor tenants: 2 (Parkson, TGV Cinemas)
- Floor area: 655,000 sq ft (60,900 m^{2})
- Floors: 10, Including basement and ground floor
- Website: www.1st-avenuepenang.com.my

1st Avenue Mall is a shopping mall within George Town in the Malaysian state of Penang. It is located at Magazine Road within the city's Central Business District (CBD), next to Komtar and Prangin Mall, and is linked to both buildings via overhead bridges.

== Development ==
Initially planned as Phase 4 of the Komtar project, 1st Avenue Mall was eventually developed by a private developer and opened to the public in 2010. Upon its completion, it competes directly against the adjacent Prangin Mall and has since attracted a variety of well-known international fashion brands, including H&M, Skechers, Cotton On and Victoria's Secret.

== Facilities ==
At present, the mall has one anchor tenant - TGV Cinemas. The latter operates a cineplex at the top floor of the shopping mall, also dubbed as Cloud 8.

1st Avenue Mall has a total of seven retail floors (LG - L4 & L8), and three multistorey carpark levels (L5 - L7)

Interior of 1st Avenue Mall

== Retail outlets ==
One of the two main anchor tenants of 1st Avenue Mall, was Parkson, which occupies 95,000 sq ft of the first four floors within the mall. However, it shut down due to COVID-19 financial difficulties. The major fashion names that have set up outlets within 1st Avenue Mall include H&M, Skechers, Giordano and Forever 21. Sports chains like Original Classic still exists inside the mall, as are home improvement stores like Mr. D.I.Y on the fourth floor.

In addition, there are a number of restaurants, cafes and beverage outlets within 1st Avenue Mall, including Texas Chicken, Starbucks, Subway, Kenny Rogers Roasters, The Chicken Rice Shop, Seoul Garden, Sushi King, Tealive, A&W, Taco Bell, J.CO Donuts, Pacific Coffee and OldTown White Coffee.

Village Grocer, a full-fledged supermarket chain of premium grocers, opened at a former old unit space of Padini in Level LG.

== Entertainment ==
1st Avenue Mall is home to a variety of entertainment options. The main anchor tenant of the mall, TGV Cinemas, operates an eight-screen cineplex at Cloud 8, the top floor of the shopping mall. At the time of its launching, it was the first TGV Cinemas outlet in George Town.

Other entertainment outlets within the mall includes an amusement centre (KB Fun) at 3rd floor, a karaoke joint (Red Box) and a roller skating rink (Rollerka) that shares the Cloud 8 with TGV Cineplex, and an indoor games outlet (Pado Fantasyland) at the fourth floor.

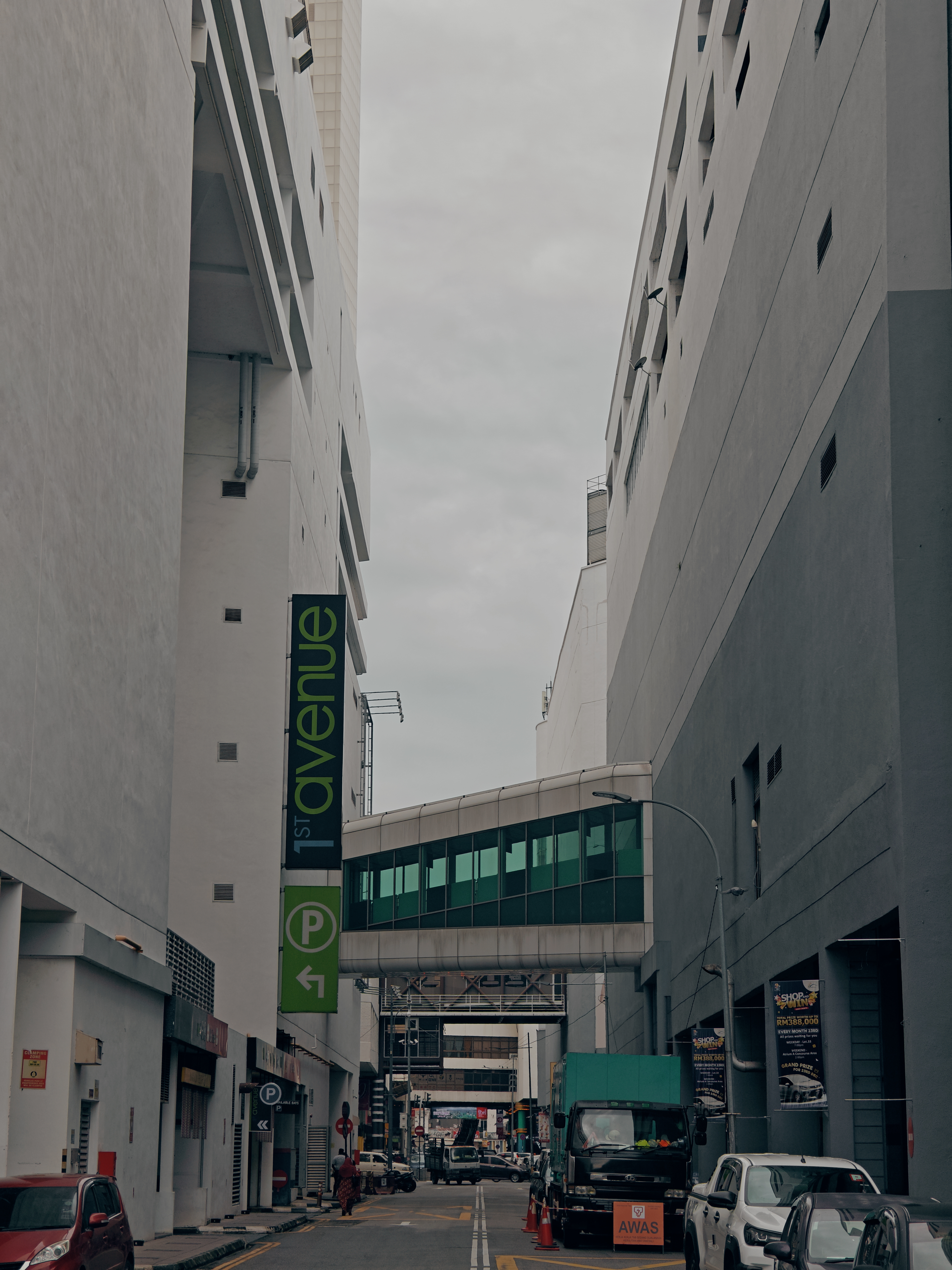
The overhead pedestrian bridge linking 1st Avenue Mall with Prangin Mall above Tek Soon Street.

== Location and access ==
1st Avenue Mall's location at the heart of George Town, right next to the Rapid Penang bus terminal in Komtar, makes it easily accessible to locals and tourists alike. One can take the free-of-charge Rapid Penang CAT bus from anywhere within George Town's UNESCO World Heritage Site to get to 1st Avenue Mall.

As most Rapid Penang bus routes on Penang Island pass through the Komtar Bus Terminal, 1st Avenue Mall can also be reached via any Rapid Penang bus heading to Komtar.

== See also ==
- List of shopping malls in Malaysia
