= Magazine Road, George Town =

Road in the Malaysian state of Penang

Magazine Road
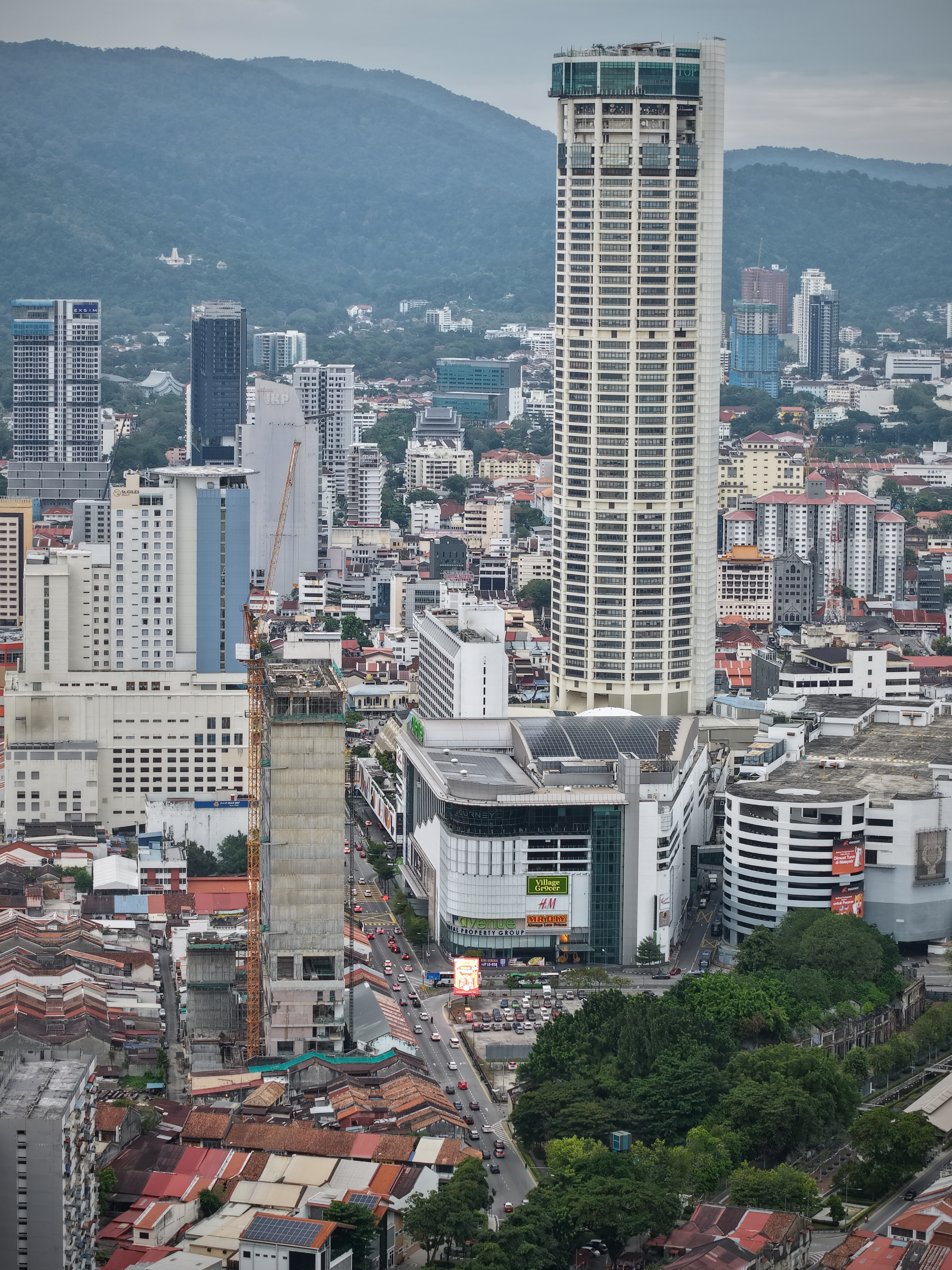
- Native name: Malay: Jalan Magazine; Simplified Chinese: 头条路; traditional Chinese: 頭條路; Hokkien POJ: Thâu-tiâu-lōo
- Maintained by: Penang Island City Council
- Location: George Town
- Coordinates: 5.41329°N 100.330392°E
- West end: Magazine Circus (next to Komtar)
- East end: Magazine Street Ghaut; Bridge Street (Jalan CY Choy)

Construction
- Inauguration: Late 19th century
- JALAN MAGAZINE Magazine Rd10300 P. PINANG

Magazine Road is a major thoroughfare in the city of George Town within the Malaysian state of Penang. The one-way road, one of the busiest in the city centre, runs along some of George Town's major landmarks, including Komtar and 1st Avenue Mall.

The road was created towards the end of the 19th century as part of an urban residential quarter known as the Seven Streets Precinct. Straits Eclectic-style shophouses can still be seen along the road, standing alongside more modern high-rises.

The western end of Magazine Road joins the similarly-named Magazine Circus, which also intersects four other major roads within the city centre - Penang Road, Macalister Road, Dato Keramat Road and Brick Kiln Road.

== Etymology ==
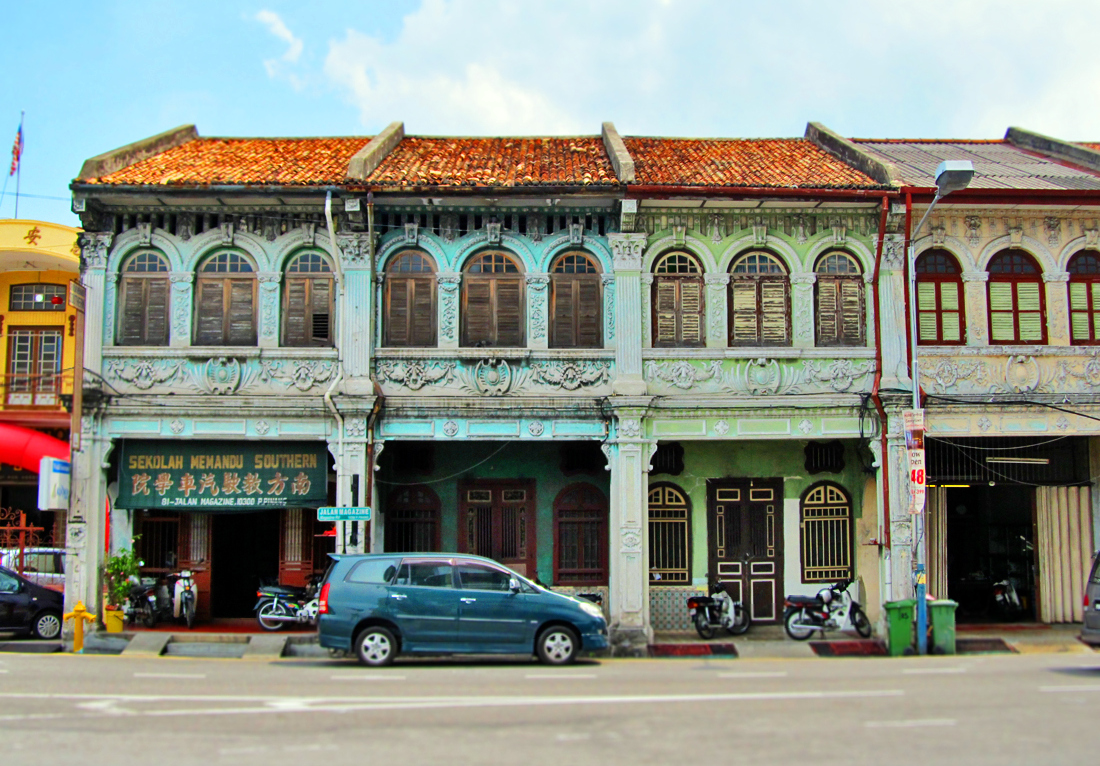
Straits Eclectic-style shophouses along Magazine Road

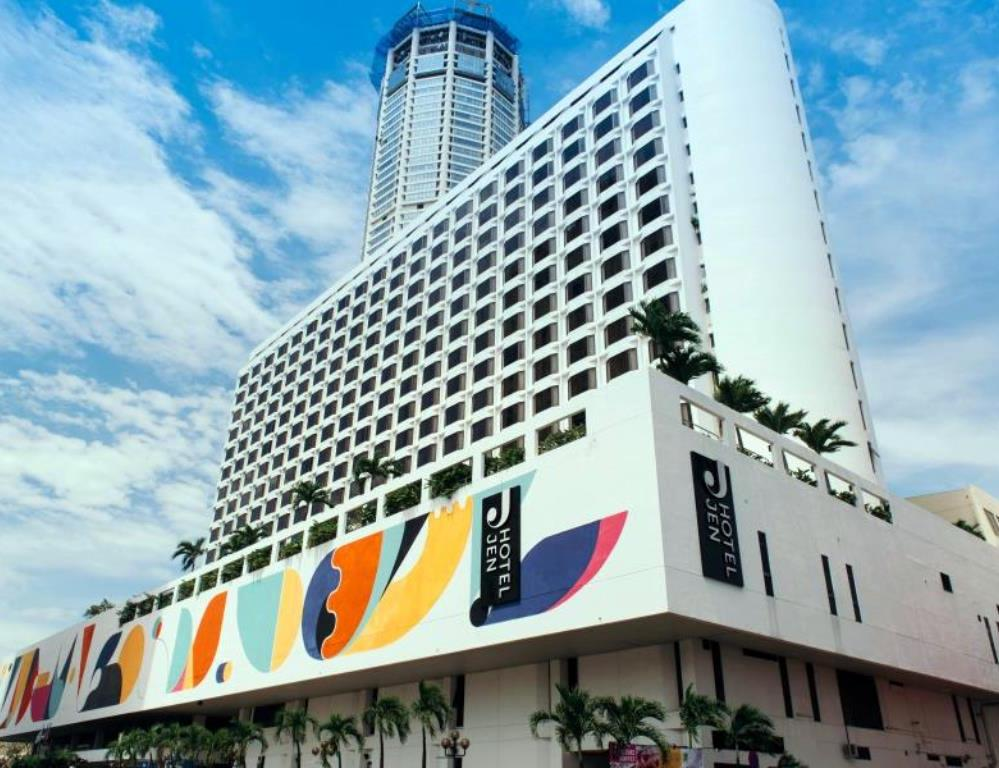
Hotel Jen, one of the buildings constructed as part of the Komtar project

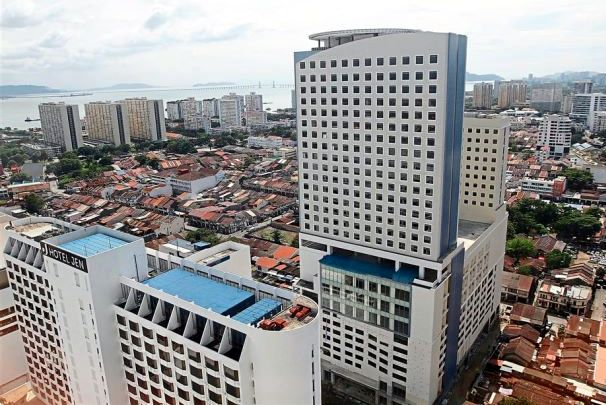
St. Giles Wembley Hotel, with the Seven Streets Precinct and the high-rises of Jelutong visible in the background.

Magazine Road was named after a gunpowder depot that once existed at the site where Gama Departmental Store now stands. The road is also known as Thaû-tiaû-lơ̄ in Penang Hokkien, implying Magazine Road's geographical location as the first (northernmost) street within the Seven Streets Precinct.

== History ==
Magazine Road was laid out in the late 19th century as part of the Seven Streets Precinct, a residential area inhabited by ethnic Chinese. The growing population of George Town led to the expansion of the city in the southerly direction across the then Prangin Canal, compelling the British authorities to create grid-like streets within the Seven Streets Precinct. Straits Eclectic-style terrace houses were built within the precinct to cater to the working- and middle-class Chinese.

Up until the late 20th century, the Seven Streets Precinct, including Magazine Road, was rife with crime and triad activities, and generally shunned by the Peranakans. It was only in the 1970s when the road witnessed more modern forms of development, starting with the construction of Komtar.

== Landmarks ==
- Komtar
- 1st Avenue Mall

== Hotels ==
- Hotel Jen
- St. Giles Wembley Hotel

== See also ==
- List of roads in George Town
