= Johor Bahru =

- State capital city and district capital
- City of Johor Bahru Bandaraya Johor Bahru (Malay)
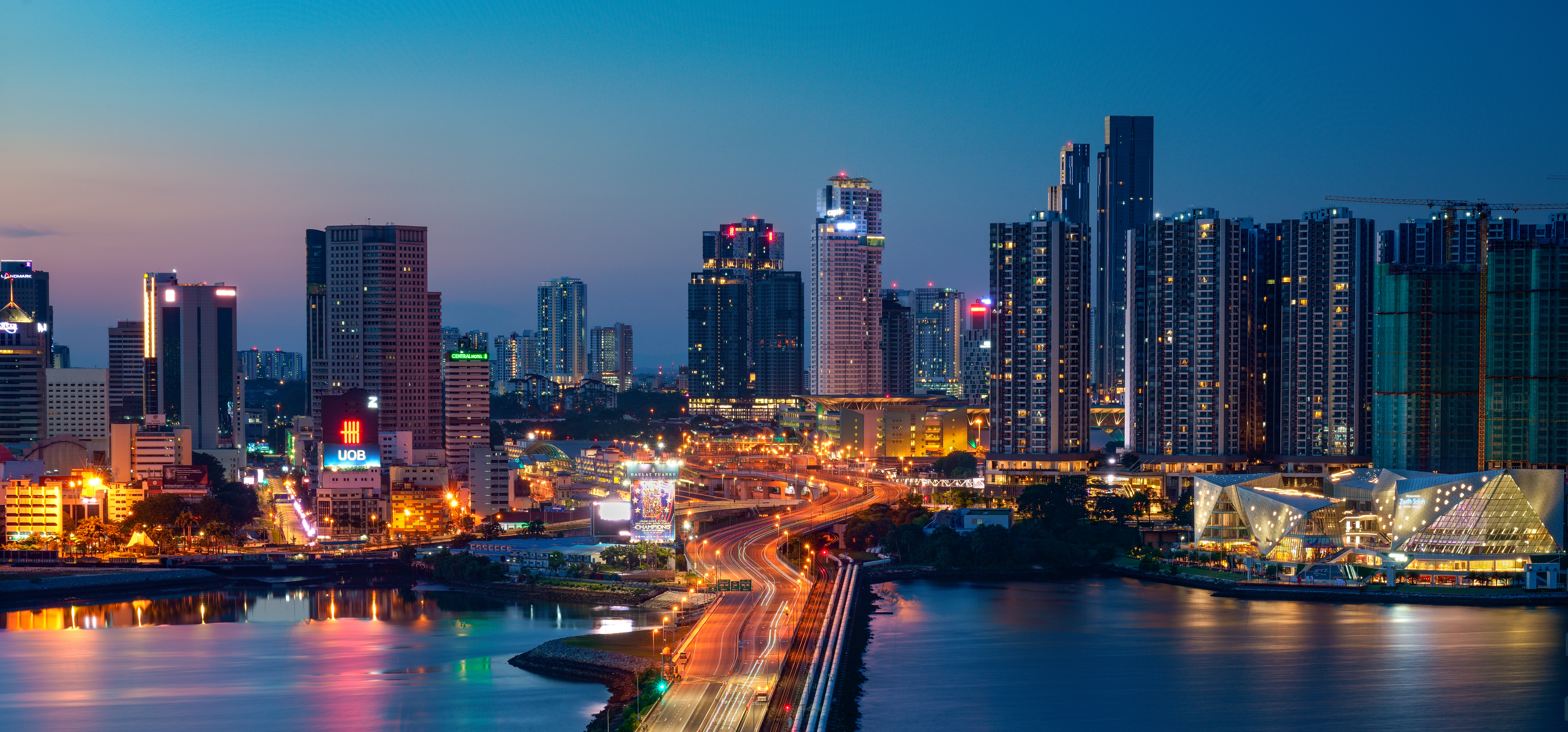
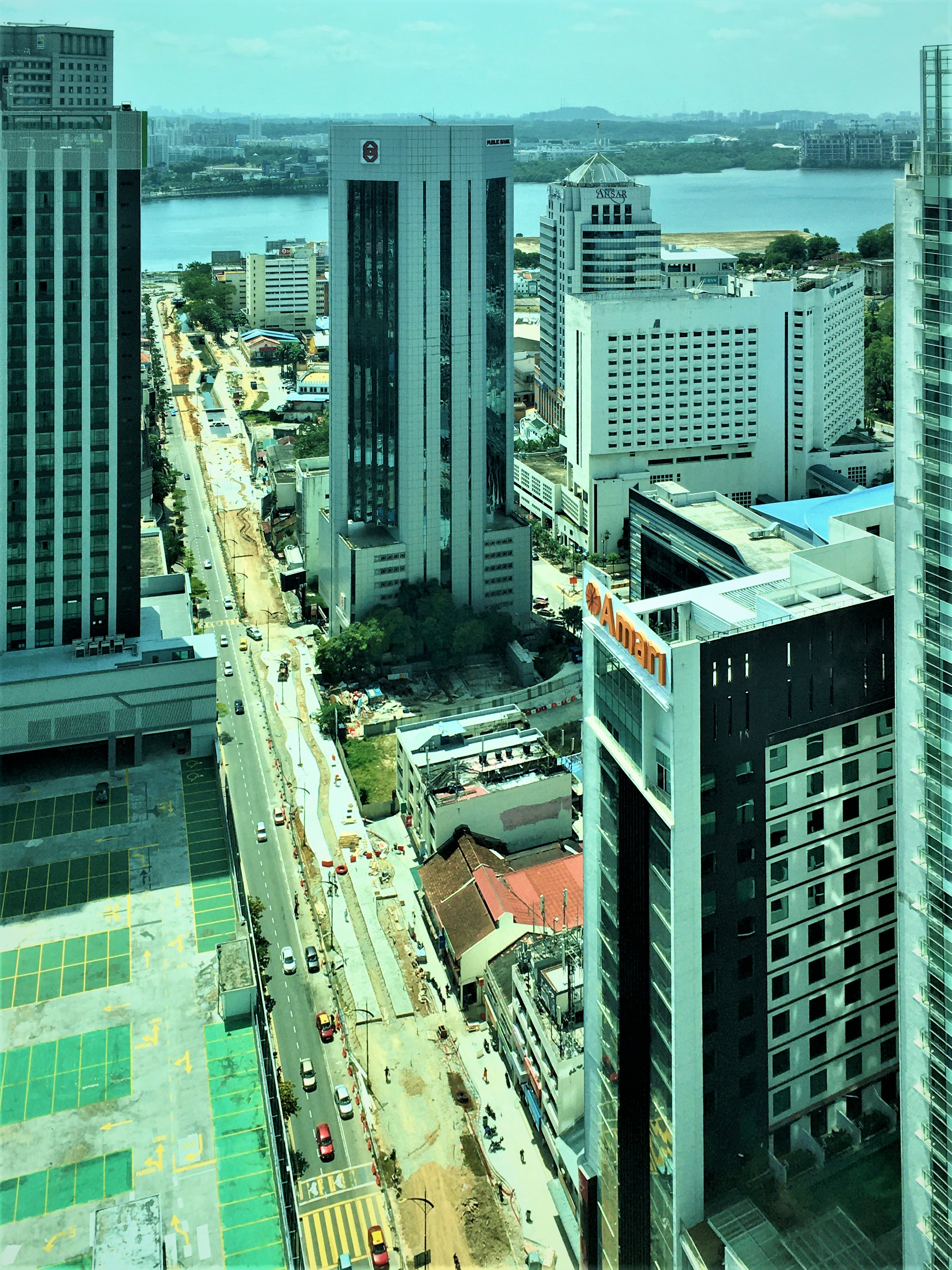
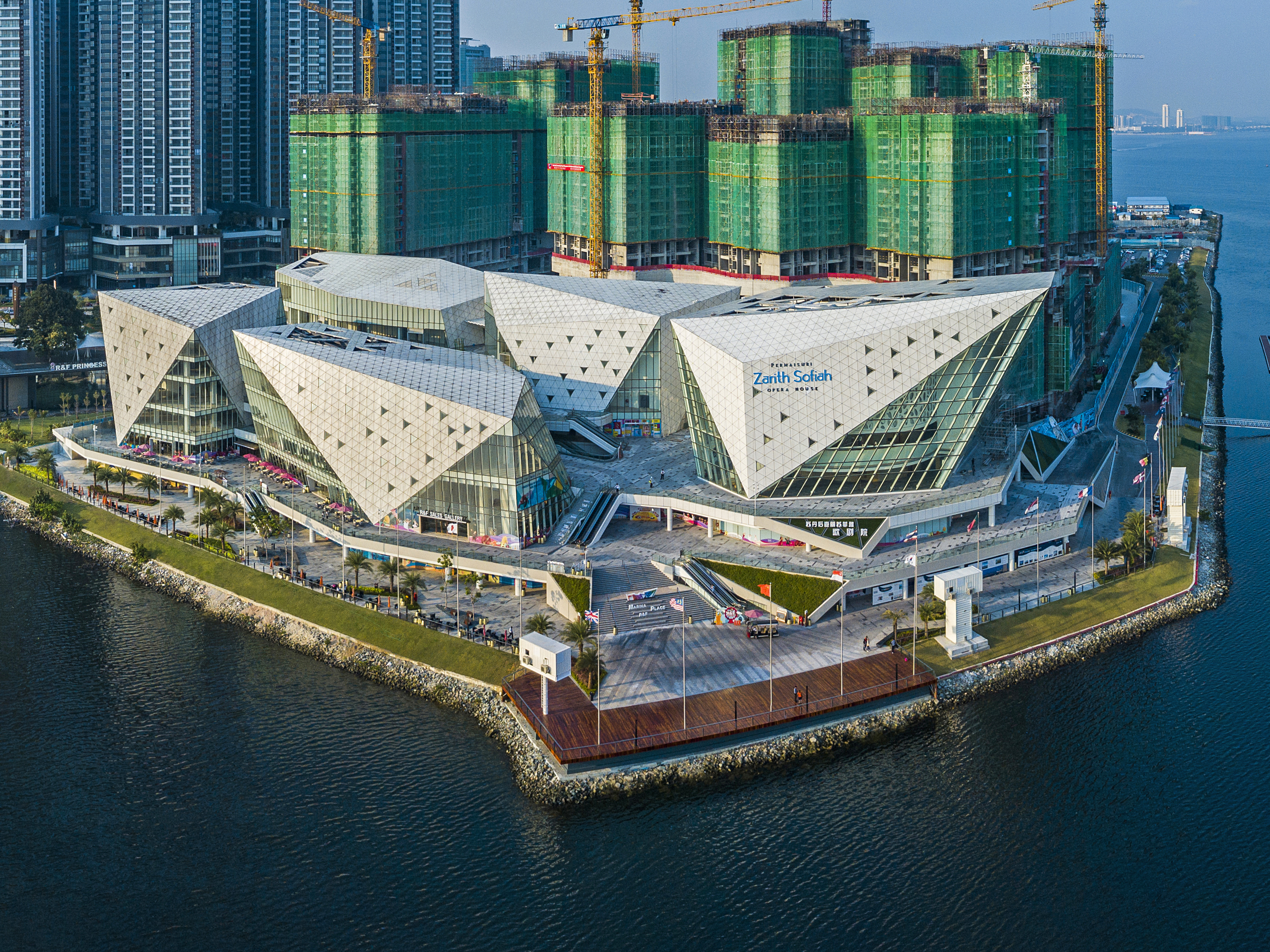
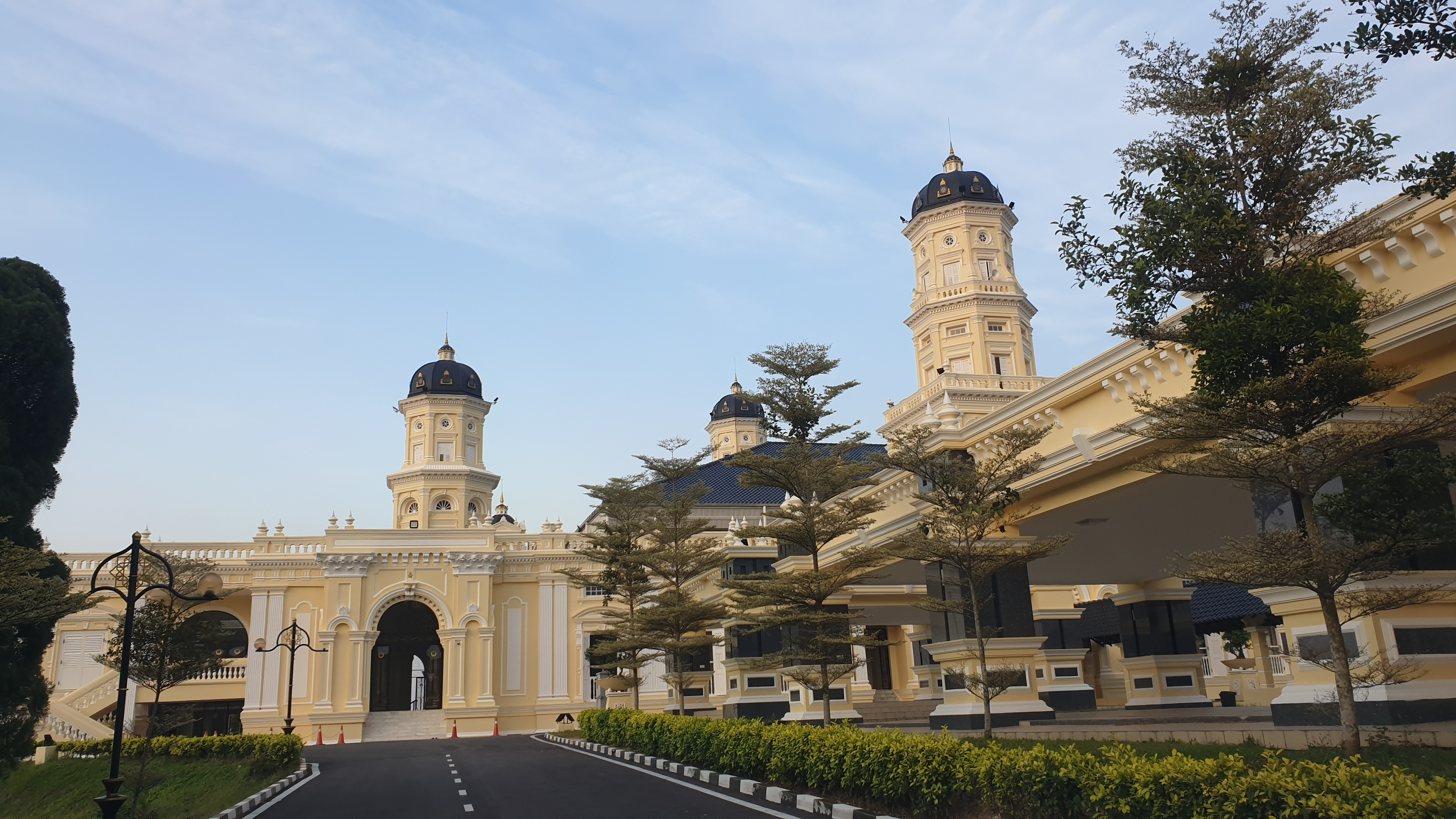
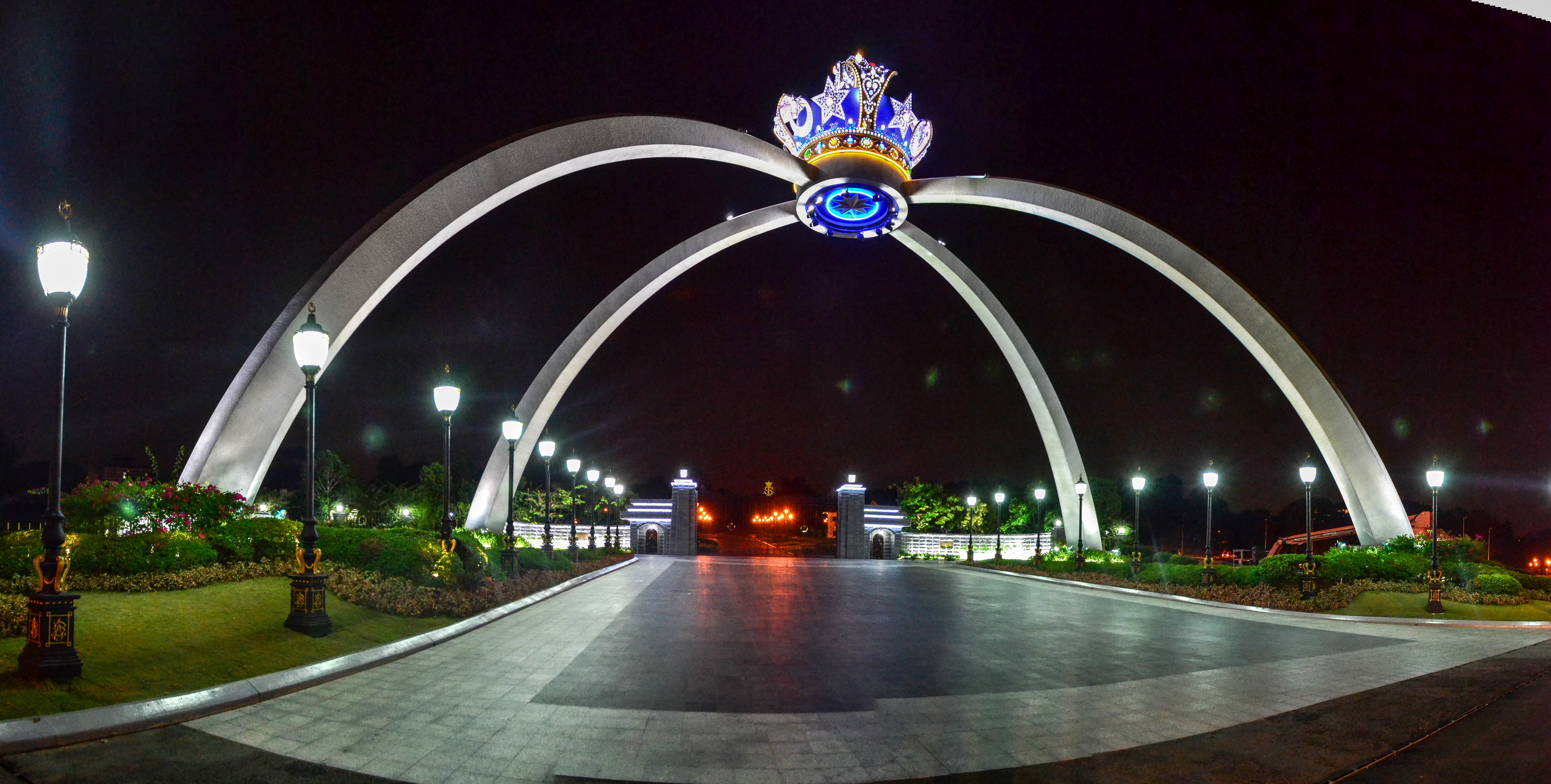
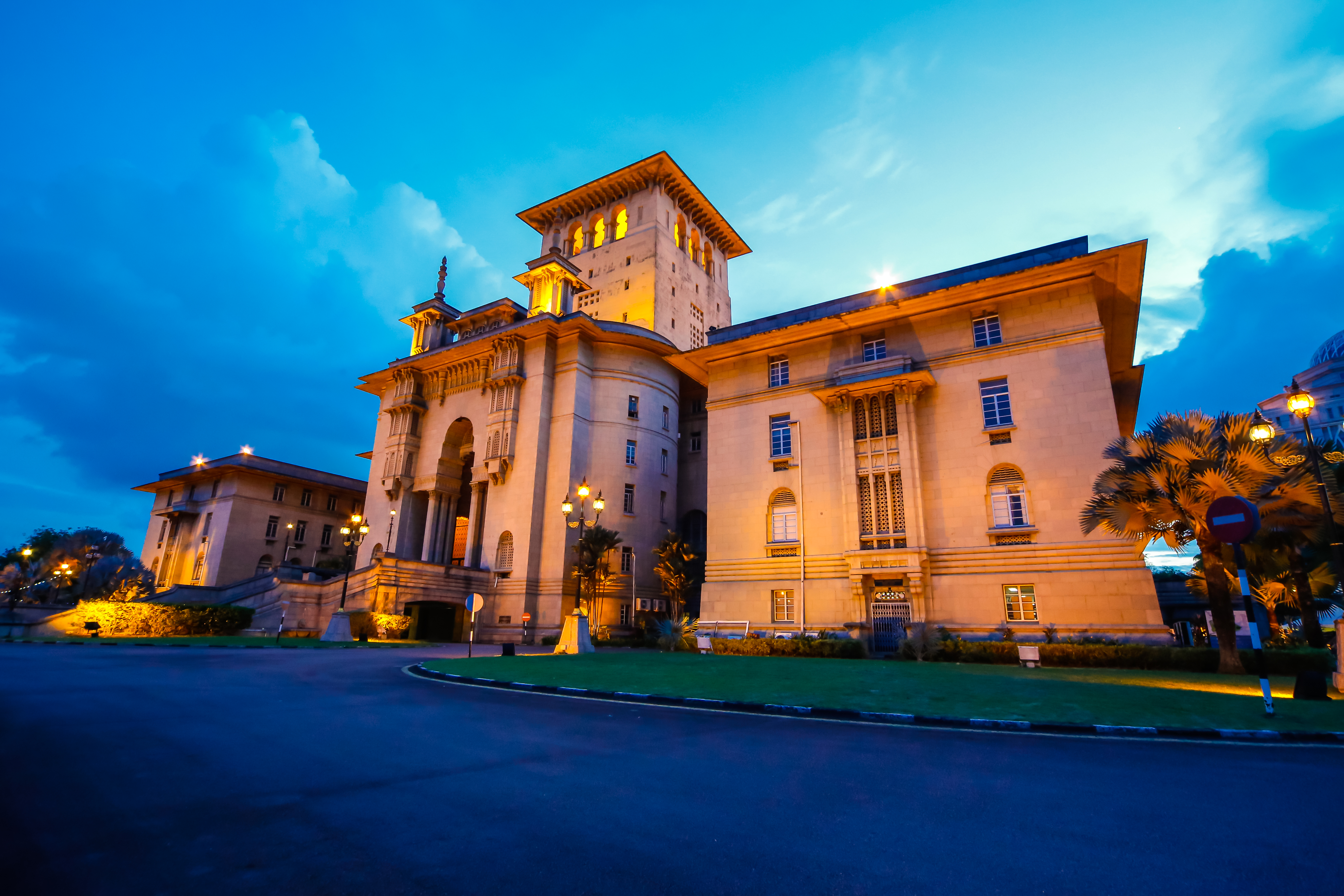
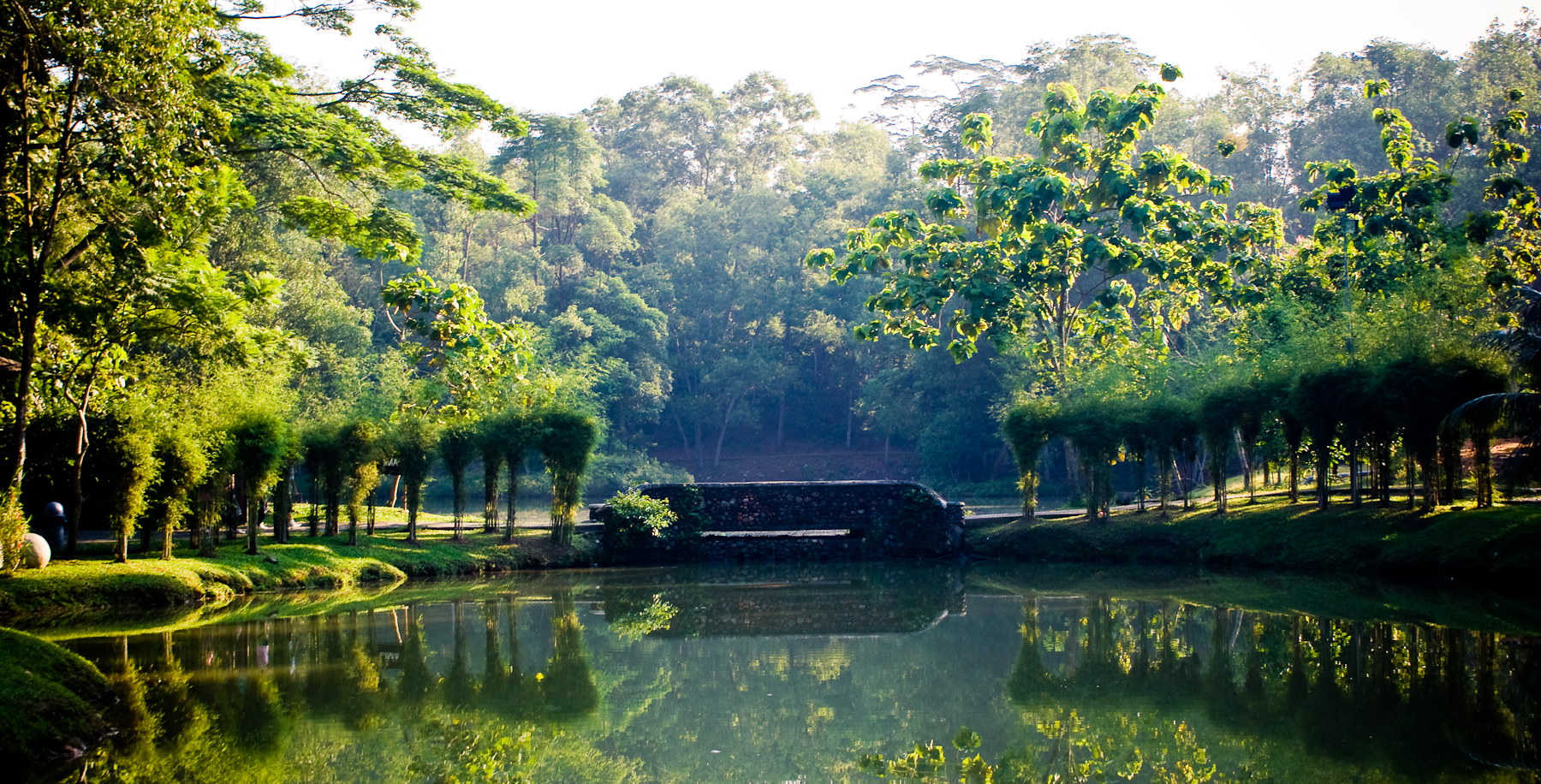
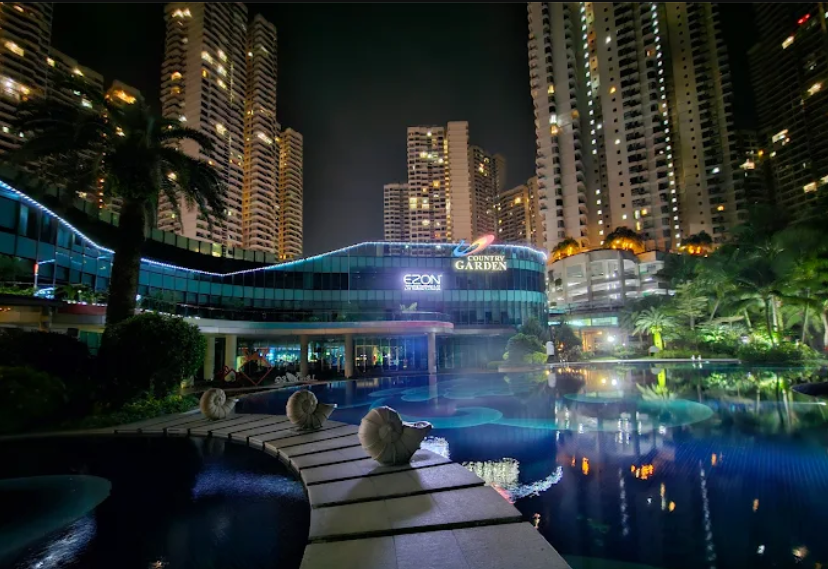
- Downtown skyline at night Wong Ah Fook Street Permaisuri Zarith Sofiah Opera House Sultan Abu Bakar Mosque Istana Bukit Serene Sultan Ibrahim Building MBJB City Forest Danga Bay

- Flag Coat of arms
- Nicknames: JB, Bandaraya Selatan (Southern City)
- Motto: Berkhidmat, Berbudaya, Berwawasan (Malay) "Service, Cultural, Visionary" (motto of Johor Bahru City Council)
- Interactive map of Johor Bahru
- Johor Bahru in Johor Johor Bahru (Malaysia) Johor Bahru (Southeast Asia) Johor Bahru (Asia)
- Coordinates: 01°27′20″N 103°45′40″E
- Country: Malaysia
- State: Johor
- District: Johor Bahru District
- Founded: 10 March 1855 (as Tanjung Puteri)
- Establishment of the Town Board: 1910
- Establishment of the Town Council: 1950
- Municipality status: 1 April 1977
- City status: 1 January 1994; 32 years ago

Government
  - Type: City council
  - Body: Johor Bahru City Council
  - Mayor: Noorazam Osman

Area
  - State capital city and district capital: 373.18 km^{2} (144.09 sq mi)
- Elevation: 32 m (105 ft)

Population (2020)
  - State capital city and district capital: 858,118
  - Density: 2,299.5/km^{2} (5,955.6/sq mi)
  - Metro: 2,487,601
- Demonym: Johor Bahru
- Time zone: UTC+8 (MST)
  - Summer (DST): UTC+8 (Not observed)
- Postal code: 80xxx to 81xxx
- Area code(s): 07
- Website: www.mbjb.gov.my

Johor Bahru (JB) (Note: Malay pronunciation: [ˈd͡ʒohor ˈbahru]) is the capital city of the Malaysian state of Johor. It is the core city of Johor Bahru District, Malaysia's second-largest district by population and economy. For the city proper, Johor Bahru had a population of 858,118 in 2020, making it Malaysia's largest state capital city by population. It is located at the southern end of the Malay Peninsula, bordering the city-state of Singapore.

As a major financial and business centre in Malaysia, Johor Bahru is Malaysia's second best-performing city behind only Kuala Lumpur, in terms of economic competitiveness, prosperity, and ease of doing business, according to the World Bank. It has the third highest quality of life in ASEAN, after Singapore and Kuala Lumpur, with the fastest urbanisation growth and internet speed among Malaysian cities. As one of the world's 100 most visited cities, Johor Bahru has the busiest land border crossing globally, via the Johor-Singapore Causeway, KTM Intercity and the future RTS Link to Singapore. Johor Bahru is served by Senai International Airport and the world's 11th-busiest port, Ports of Johor.

During the reign of Sultan Abu Bakar between 1886 and 1895, the city witnessed modernisation from a fishing village, with the construction of administrative centres, offices, schools, and railways to Woodlands, Singapore. Japanese forces occupied Johor Bahru during the Pacific War. Johor Bahru thus became the post-war cradle of Malay nationalism, forming a major political party, UMNO at the Istana Besar in 1946. Granted city status in 1994, Johor Bahru is currently part of the Johor-Singapore Special Economic Zone and Iskandar Malaysia, the nation's largest special economic zone by investment value.

== Etymology ==
The present area of Johor Bahru was originally known as Tanjung Puteri, and was a fishing village of the Malays. Temenggong Daeng Ibrahim then renamed Tanjung Puteri to Iskandar Puteri upon his arrival to the area in 1858, after acquiring the territory from Sultan Ali. It was renamed to Johor Bahru by Sultan Abu Bakar following the Temenggong's death. The word "Bah(a)ru" means "new" in Malay; thus, Johor Bahru means "New Johor", differentiating it from Johor Lama ("Old Johor"). Bahru is normally written as "baru" in English (Roman) characters, today, although the word appears in other place names with several English spelling variants, such as in Kota Bharu, Kelantan, and Pekanbaru, Riau (Indonesia). In British English it was written as Johore Bahru or Johore Bharu, though the currently-accepted western spelling is Johor Bahru—Johore is only spelt Johor, without the letter "e" at the end of the word, in the Malay language. The city's name is also spelt as Johor Baru or Johor Baharu.

Johor Bahru was once known as Shantou, or "Little Swatow", by the city's Chinese community, as most of the Chinese residents are Teochew whose ancestry can be traced back to Shantou, China; they arrived in the mid-19th century, during the reign of Temenggong Daeng Ibrahim. The city, however, is generally known in Chinese as Xinshan, meaning "New Mountain" (Chinese: 新山; pinyin: Xīnshān), as "mountain" may be used to mean "territory" or "land". The name "New Mountain" distinguished it from "Old Mountain" (Jiushan), once used to refer to Kranji and Sembawang (in Singapore), where the Chinese first cultivated black pepper and gambier on plantations before relocating to new lands in Johor Bahru in 1855.

A further Chinese transliteration of Johor is 柔佛 (pinyin: róufó), literally meaning "gentle Buddha", which is for example part of the official name of Johor Bahru Old Chinese Temple (柔佛古廟).

== History ==
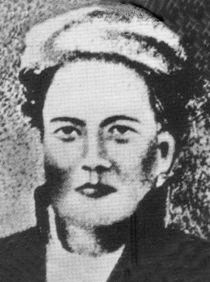
Temenggong Daeng Ibrahim, who renamed Tanjung Puteri to Iskandar Puteri, old name of Johor Bahru

Due to a dispute between the Malays and the Bugis, the Johor-Riau Sultanate was split in 1819 with the mainland portion of the Johor Sultanate coming under the control of Temenggong Daeng Ibrahim while the Riau-Lingga Sultanate came under the control of the Bugis. The Temenggong intended to create a new administration centre for the Johor Sultanate to create a dynasty under the entity of Temenggong. As the Temenggong already had a close relationship with the British and the British intended to have control over trade activities in Singapore, a treaty was signed between Sultan Ali and Temenggong Ibrahim in Singapore on 10 March 1855. According to the treaty, Ali would be crowned as the Sultan of Johor and receive $5,000 (in Spanish dollars) with an allowance of $500 per month. In return, Ali was required to cede the sovereignty of the territory of Johor (except Kesang of Muar which would be the only territory under his control) to Temenggong Ibrahim. When both sides agreed on Temenggong acquiring the territory, he renamed it Iskandar Puteri and began to administer it from Telok Blangah in Singapore.

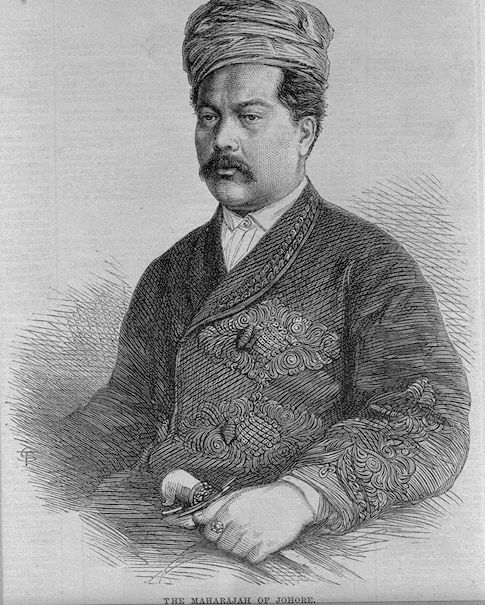
Sultan Abu Bakar, recognised as the founder of the modern city of Johor Bahru

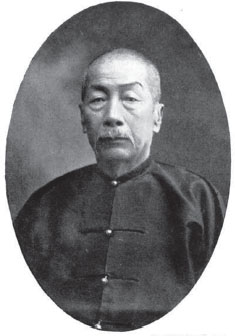
Wong Ah Fook, the royal builder who contributed to the early development of the city's infrastructure

As the area was still an undeveloped jungle, Temenggong encouraged the migration of Chinese and Javanese to clear the land and to develop an agricultural economy in Johor. The Chinese planted the area with black pepper and gambier, while the Javanese dug parit (canals) to drain water from the land, build roads and plant coconuts. During this time, a Chinese businessman, pepper and gambier cultivator, Wong Ah Fook arrived; at the same time, the Kangchu and Javanese labour contract systems were introduced by the Chinese and Javanese communities. After Temenggong's death on 31 January 1862, the town was renamed "Johor Bahru" and his position was succeeded by his son, Abu Bakar, with the administration centre in Telok Blangah being moved to the area in 1889.

=== British administration ===
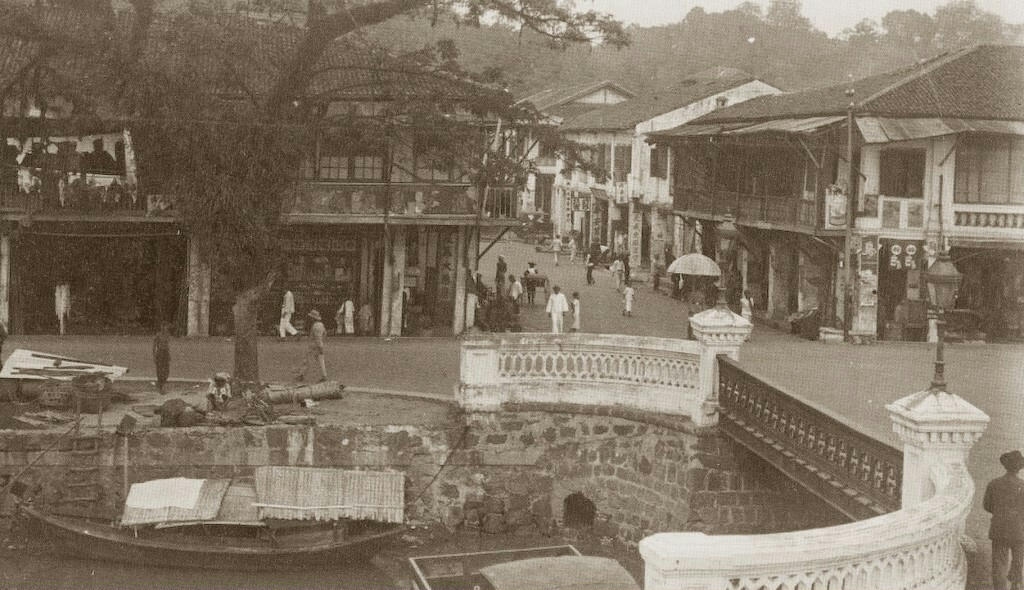
Segget River at the junction of Wong Ah Fook Street and Ungku Puan Street in Johor Bahru, c. 1920.

In the first phase of Abu Bakar's administration, the British only recognised him as a maharaja rather than a sultan. In 1855, the British Colonial Office began to recognise his status as a Sultan after he met Queen Victoria. He managed to regain Kesang territory for Johor after a civil war with the aid of British forces and he boosted the town's infrastructure and agricultural economy. Infrastructure such as the State Mosque and Royal Palace was built with the aid of Wong Ah Fook, who had become a close patron for the Sultan since his migration during the Temenggong reign. As the Johor-British relationship improved, Abu Bakar also set up his administration under a British style and implemented a constitution known as Undang-undang Tubuh Negeri Johor (Johor State Constitution). Although the British had long been advisers for the Sultanate of Johor, the Sultanate never came under direct colonial rule of the British. The direct colonial rule only came into effect when the status of the adviser was elevated to a status similar to that of a Resident in the Federated Malay States (FMS) during the reign of Sultan Ibrahim in 1914.

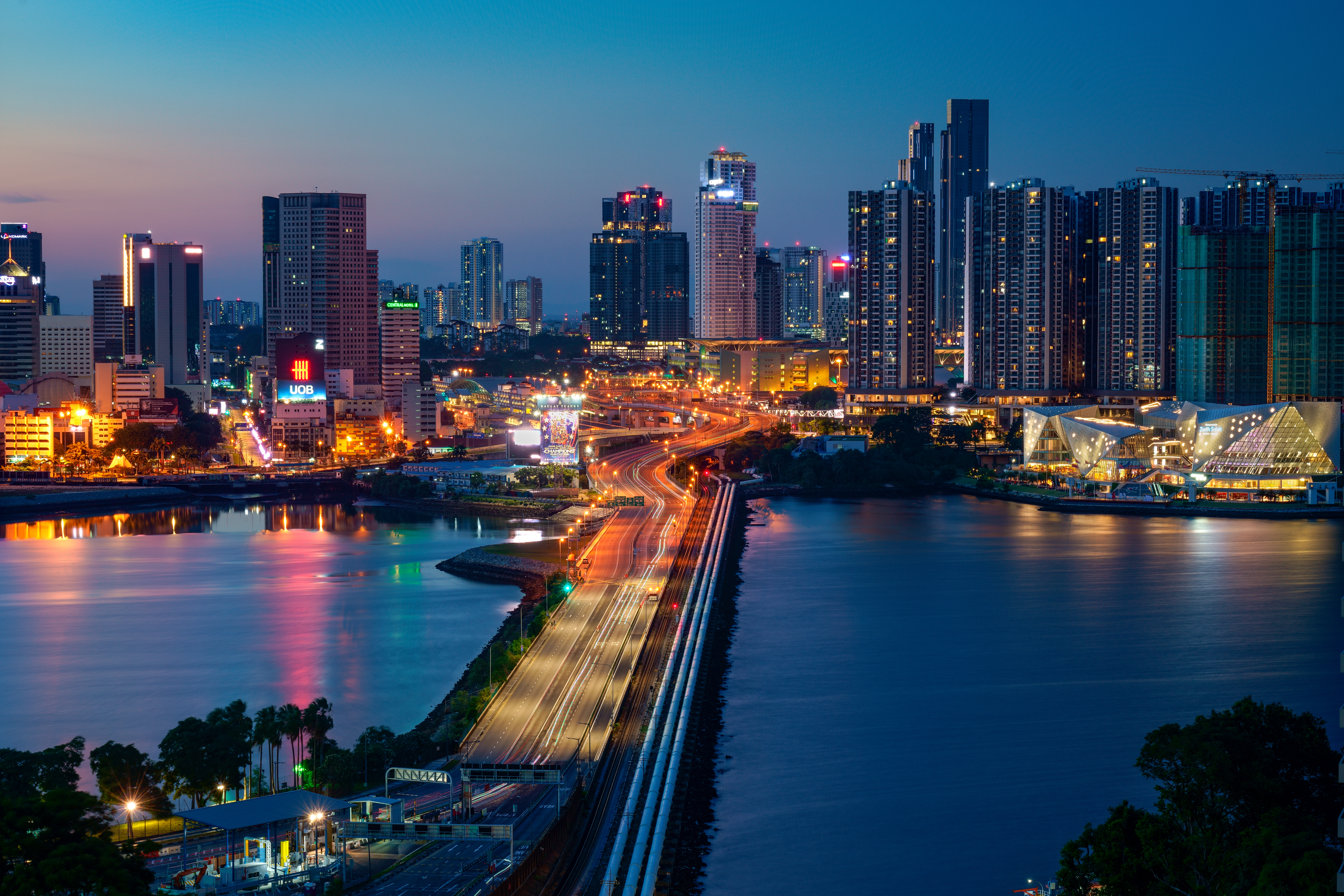
Johor–Singapore Causeway viewed from Woodlands in Singapore.

In Johor Bahru, the Malay Peninsula railway extension was finished in 1909. In 1923 the Johor–Singapore Causeway was completed. Johor Bahru developed at a modest rate between the First and Second World Wars. The secretariat building—Sultan Ibrahim Building—was completed in 1940 as the British colonial government attempted to streamline the state's administration.

=== World War II ===
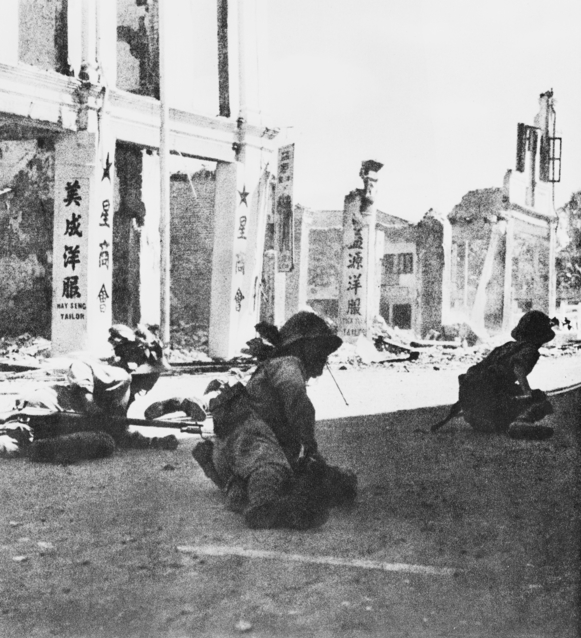
Japanese troops crouched in the street of Johor Bahru in the final stages of the Battle of Malaya to conquer Singapore: image taken on 31 January 1942.

The continuous development of Johor Bahru was, however, halted when the Japanese under General Tomoyuki Yamashita invaded the town on 31 January 1942. As the Japanese had reached northwest Johor by 15 January, they easily captured major towns of Johor such of Batu Pahat, Yong Peng, Kluang and Ayer Hitam. The British and other Allied forces were forced to retreat towards Johor Bahru; however, following a further series of bombings by the Japanese on 29 January, the British retreated to Singapore and blew up the causeway the following day as a final attempt to stop the Japanese advance in British Malaya. The Japanese then used the Sultan's residence of Bukit Serene Palace located in the town as their main temporary base for their future initial plans to conquer Singapore while waiting to reconnect the causeway. The Japanese chose the palace as their main base because they already knew the British would not dare to attack it as this would harm their close relationship with Johor.

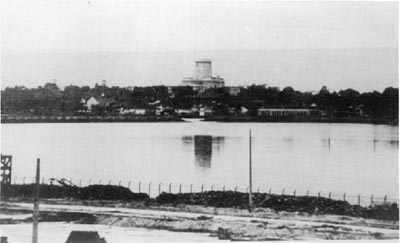
A view of the causeway, after being blown up by Allied forces as a final action to counter the Japanese advance

In less than a month, the Japanese repaired the causeway and invaded the Singapore island easily. Soon after the war ended in 1946, the town became the main hotspot for Malay nationalism in Malaya. Onn Jaafar, a local Malay politician who later became the Chief Minister of Johor, formed the United Malay National Organisation party on 11 May 1946 when the Malays expressed their widespread disenchantment over the British government's action for granting citizenship laws to non-Malays in the proposed states of the Malayan Union. An agreement over the policy was then reached in the town with Malays agreeing with the dominance of economy by the non-Malays and the Malays' dominance in political matters being agreed upon by non-Malays. Racial conflict between the Malay and non-Malays, especially the Chinese, is being provoked continuously since the Malayan Emergency.

=== Post-independence ===
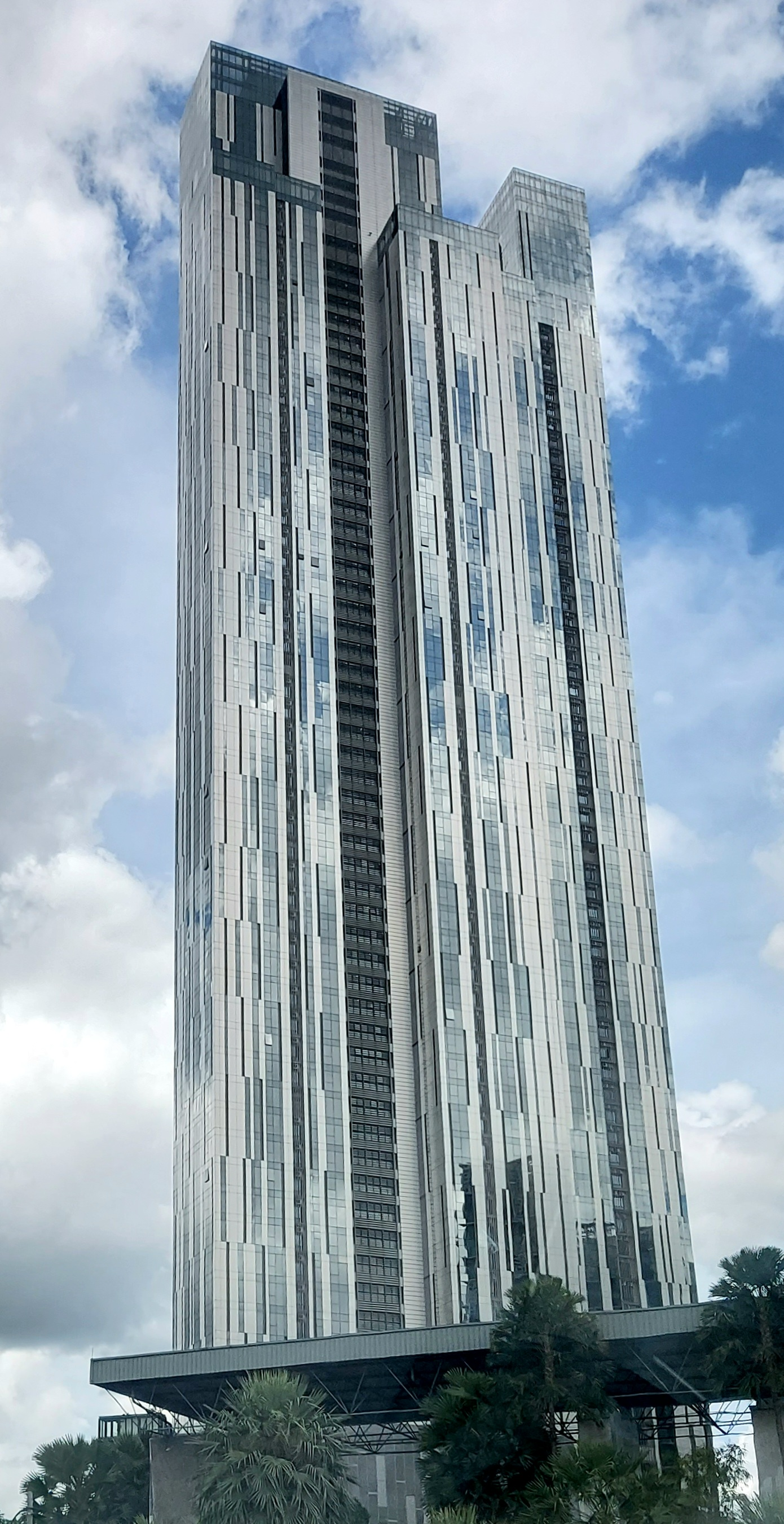
The Astaka is the tallest residential building in Southeast Asia.

After the formation of the Federation of Malaysia in 1963, Johor Bahru continued as the state capital and more development was carried out, with the town's expansion and the construction of more new townships and industrial estates. The Indonesian confrontation did not directly affect Johor Bahru as the main Indonesian landing point in Johor was in Labis and Tenang in Segamat District as well Pontian District. There was only one active Indonesian spy organisation in the town, known as Gerakan Ekonomi Melayu Indonesia (GEMI). They frequently engaged with the Indonesian communities living there to contribute information for Indonesian commandos until the bombing of the MacDonald House in Singapore in 1965. (Note: Another early attack to destabilise Malaysia was done with the murder of Malay trishaw in Singapore that led to the racial conflict between Malay and Chinese there. At the first stage of the conflict, it was alleged the murder was done by a Chinese but this was however turned down when further investigation revealed the murder was actually done by Indonesian agents who had infiltrate Singapore in an attempt to weakening the unity of race there during the state was still part of Malaysia. (Drysdale, Halim and Jamie)) By the early 1990s, the town had considerably expanded in size, and was officially granted a city status on 1 January 1994. Johor Bahru City Council was formed and the city's current main square, Johor Bahru City Square, was constructed to commemorate the event. A central business district was developed in the centre of the city from the mid-1990s in the area around Wong Ah Fook Street. The state and federal government channelled considerable funds for the development of the city—particularly more so after 2006, when the Iskandar Malaysia was formed.

For more than ten years of building construction and rapid urbanisation in Johor Bahru, the city has experienced a series of property boom with many new higher-end high-rise apartments and commercial property, including The Astaka, which has been the tallest building in the city and outside Kuala Lumpur since 2018, and is one of the tallest twin towers in the world. With the gradual improvement of quality of life and infrastructure, Johor Bahru has also been ranked one of the global cities with the highest living quality, the third highest in Southeast Asia after Singapore and Kuala Lumpur, according to Mercer, as of 2024. Today, it is also Malaysia's fastest city in terms of internet speed, second only after Singapore in Southeast Asia.

== Governance ==
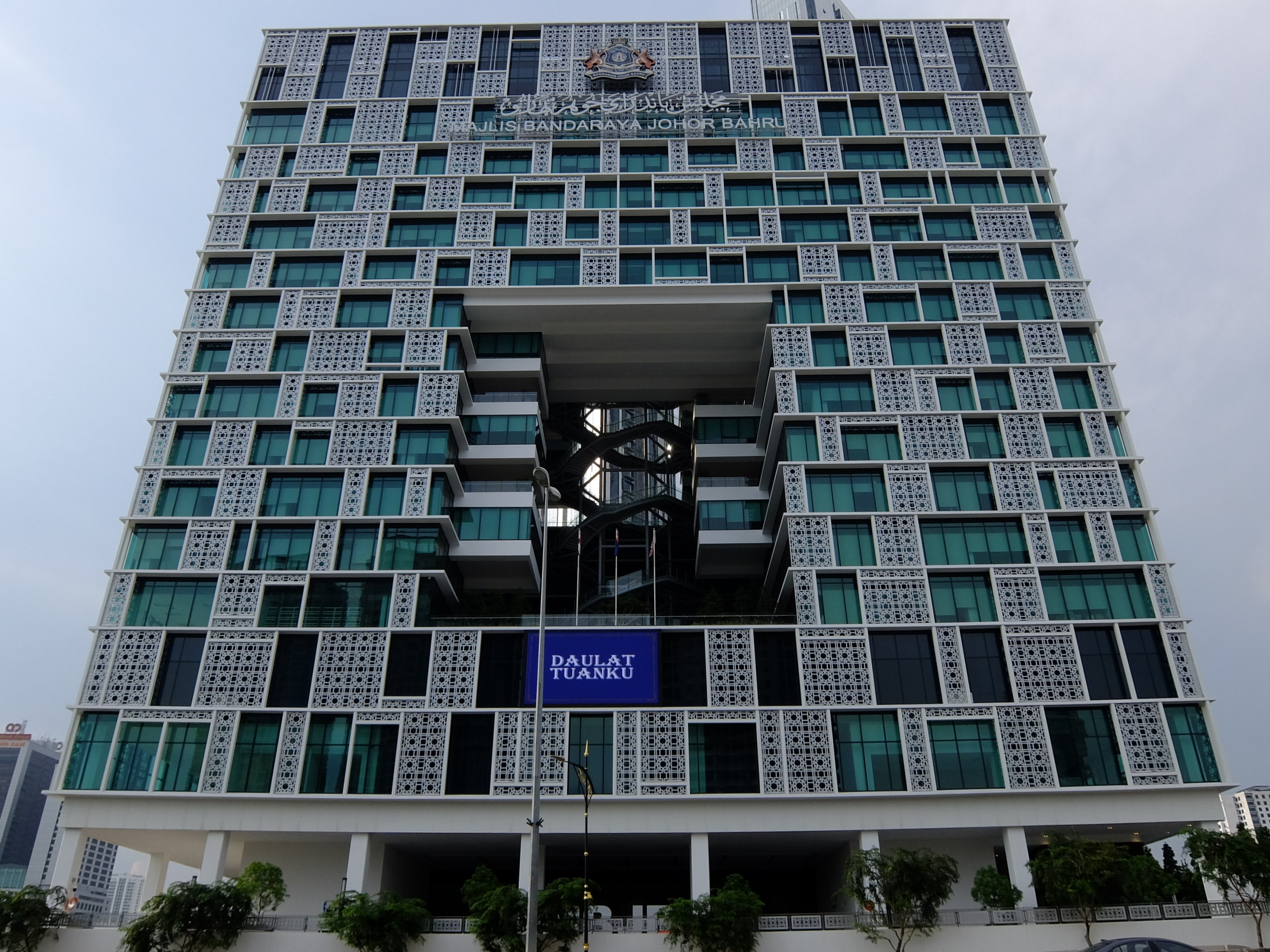
MBJB Tower, headquarters of Johor Bahru City Council.

As the capital city of Johor, the city plays an important role in the economic welfare of the entire state's population. According to the Doing Business Ranking published by the World Bank, Johor Bahru had the second most efficient governance in Malaysia in terms of property registration, only after Kuala Lumpur. There is one member of parliament (MP) representing the single parliamentary constituency (P.160) in the city. The city also elects two representatives to the state legislature from the state assembly districts of Larkin and Stulang.

=== Local authority and city definition ===
The city is administered by its local authority – Johor Bahru City Council, which is currently headquartered at MBJB Tower in Bukit Senyum, Plentong, just outside the city centre. It is headed by mayor Mohd Haffiz Ahmad, who took office since 3 January 2025.

When Johor Bahru obtained city status on 1 January 1994, it had an initial area of 186 square kilometres (72 sq mi) through merger of the original Johor Bahru municipality area and four housing areas of Taman Daya, Taman Megah Ria, Kota Puteri Township and Taman Rinting that were transferred from Johor Bahru Tengah. This was increased to 220 square kilometres (85 sq mi) in the year 2000 after first parts of Tebrau area were transferred from Johor Bahru Tengah municipality. On 2 July 2014, the Johor State Government decided to cede parts of Pulai Mukim across Skudai River along Jalan Ismail Sultan, Second parts of Tebrau Mukim, West parts of Plentong Mukim and a small portion of Sungai Tiram Mukim from Johor Bahru Tengah through a redelination exercise that took effect on 1 January 2016. At the same time, areas around Taman Rinting and Sierra Perdana were ceded to Pasir Gudang Municipal Council. Thus, the city limit increased to 373.18 square kilometres (144.09 sq mi).

=== Courts of law and legal enforcement ===
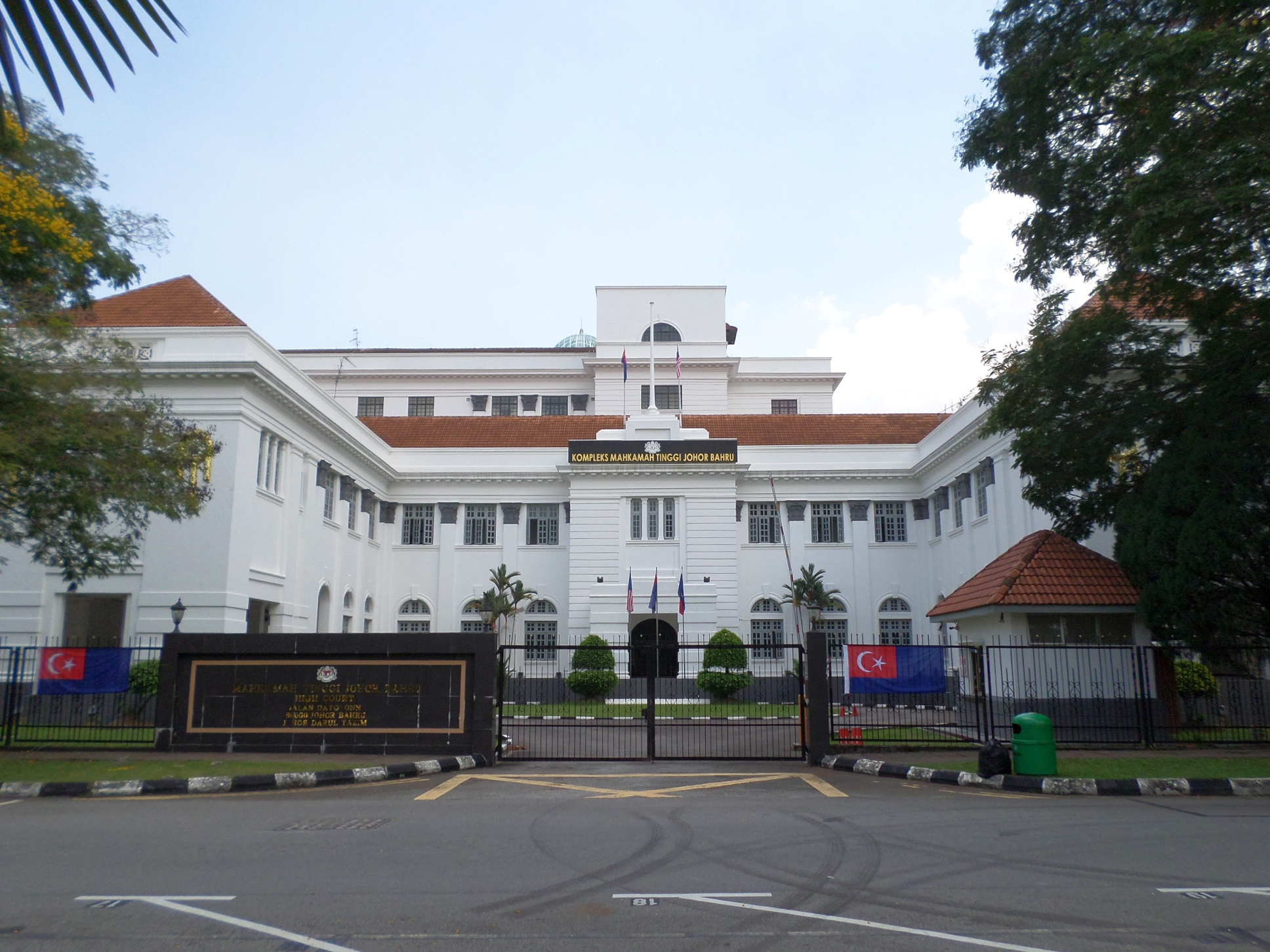
Johor Bahru High Court

The city high court complex is located along Dato' Onn Road. The Sessions and Magistrate Courts is located on Ayer Molek Road, while another court for Sharia law is located on Abu Bakar Road. The Johor (state) Police Contingent Headquarters is located on Tebrau Road. Johor Bahru's Southern District police headquarters, which also operates as a police station, is on Meldrum Road in the city centre. The Johor Bahru Southern District traffic police headquarters is a separate entity along Tebrau Road, close to the city centre. Johor Bahru's Northern District police headquarters and Northern District Traffic Police headquarters are co-located in Skudai, about 20 km north of the city centre. There are around eleven police stations and seven police substations (Pondok Polis) in the greater Johor Bahru area. Johor Bahru Prison was located in the city along Ayer Molek Road, but was closed down after 122 years operation in December 2005, its function being transferred to an expanded prison in the town of Kluang about 110 km from Johor Bahru. Other temporary lock-ups or prison cells are available in most police stations in the city, as in other parts of Malaysia.

== Geography ==
Johor Bahru is located along the Straits of Johor at the southern end of Peninsular Malaysia with mostly flat landscape, save for some hills dotted around the city area.

=== Climate ===
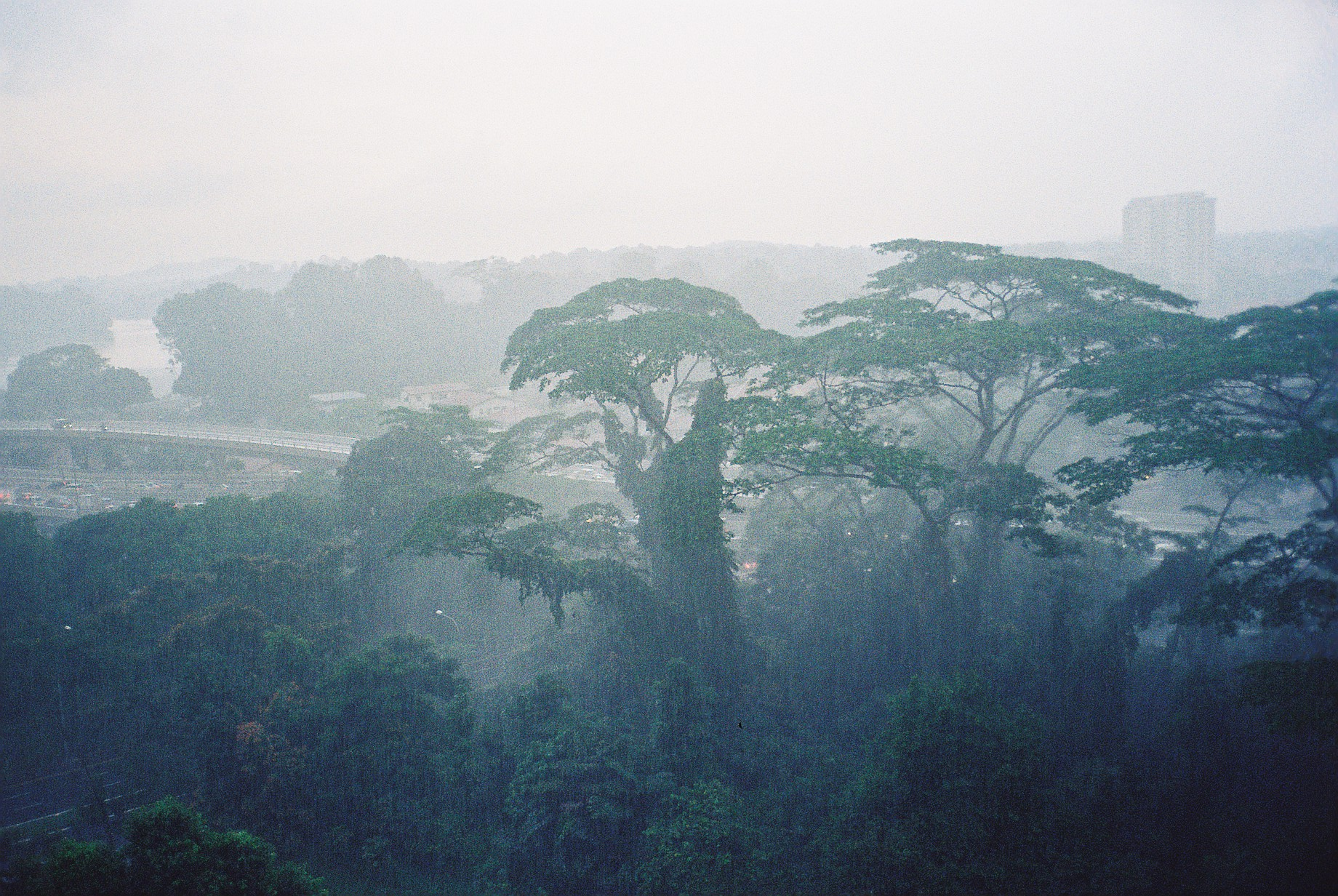
Tropical rainforest near the city, features an equatorial climate.

The city has an equatorial climate with consistent temperatures, a considerable amount of rain, and high humidity throughout the course of the year. An equatorial climate is a tropical rainforest climate more subject to the Intertropical Convergence Zone than the trade winds and with no cyclone. Daily average temperatures range from 26.4 °C (79.5 °F) in January to 27.8 °C (82.0 °F) in April with an average annual rainfall of around 2,350 mm (93 in). The wettest months, with 19 to 25 per cent more rain than average, are April, November and December. Although the climate is relatively uniform, it does show some seasonal variation due to the effects of monsoons, with noticeable changes in wind speed and direction, cloud cover and amount of rainfall. There are two monsoon periods each year, the first one between mid-October and January, which is the north-east Monsoon. This period is characterised by heavier rainfall and wind from the north-east. The second one is the south-west Monsoon, which hardly affects the rainfall in Johor Bahru, where winds are from the south and south-west. This occurs between June and September.

Climate data for Johor Bahru (Senai International Airport) (2006–2020 normals, extremes 2015–present)
Month	Jan	Feb	Mar	Apr	May	Jun	Jul	Aug	Sep	Oct	Nov	Dec	Year
Record high °C (°F)	36.7 (98.1)	36.6 (97.9)	37.0 (98.6)	37.3 (99.1)	36.2 (97.2)	36.9 (98.4)	36.6 (97.9)	36.2 (97.2)	36.9 (98.4)	35.5 (95.9)	35.1 (95.2)	35.3 (95.5)	37.3 (99.1)
Mean daily maximum °C (°F)	30.8 (87.4)	31.4 (88.5)	32.2 (90.0)	32.4 (90.3)	32.0 (89.6)	31.6 (88.9)	31.2 (88.2)	31.3 (88.3)	31.6 (88.9)	31.8 (89.2)	31.2 (88.2)	30.8 (87.4)	31.5 (88.7)
Daily mean °C (°F)	27.1 (80.8)	27.3 (81.1)	27.9 (82.2)	28.3 (82.9)	28.2 (82.8)	27.9 (82.2)	27.6 (81.7)	27.5 (81.5)	27.6 (81.7)	27.8 (82.0)	27.6 (81.7)	27.3 (81.1)	27.7 (81.8)
Mean daily minimum °C (°F)	23.3 (73.9)	23.3 (73.9)	23.7 (74.7)	24.1 (75.4)	24.3 (75.7)	24.3 (75.7)	24.0 (75.2)	23.7 (74.7)	23.6 (74.5)	23.8 (74.8)	24.0 (75.2)	23.9 (75.0)	23.8 (74.9)
Record low °C (°F)	21.7 (71.1)	21.6 (70.9)	22.3 (72.1)	22.2 (72.0)	21.9 (71.4)	22.0 (71.6)	21.9 (71.4)	21.2 (70.2)	21.6 (70.9)	22.4 (72.3)	22.3 (72.1)	22.2 (72.0)	21.2 (70.2)
Average precipitation mm (inches)	162.6 (6.40)	139.8 (5.50)	203.4 (8.01)	232.8 (9.17)	215.3 (8.48)	148.1 (5.83)	177.0 (6.97)	185.9 (7.32)	190.8 (7.51)	217.7 (8.57)	237.6 (9.35)	244.5 (9.63)	2,355.5 (92.74)
Average precipitation days (≥ 1.0 mm)	11	9	13	15	15	12	13	13	13	16	17	15	162
Source 1: IEM
Source 2: World Meteorological Organisation (precipitation 1974–2000)Meteomanz (extremes)

=== Urban Planning ===
Johor Bahru is a largely suburban city, which has considerable urban sprawl and a high degree of car dependency. The state government has acknowledged the high degree of traffic congestion within the city, and has been making plans for the implementation of a Light Rail Transit (LRT) or Bus Rapid Transit (BRT) system since at least 2017. As of 2024, the state government is commencing plans to construct an elevated Autonomous Rail Rapid Transit (ART) network in the city.

== Demographics ==
Johor Bahru has an official demonym where people are commonly referred to as "Johor Bahruans". The terms "J.B-ites" and "J.B-ians" have also been used to a limited extent. People from Johor are called Johoreans.

=== Ethnicity and religion ===
The Malaysian Census in 2020 reported the population of Johor Bahru as 858,118, making it the largest state capital city in Malaysia by population. It also forms the capital of Johor Bahru District, which includes Iskandar Puteri and Pasir Gudang, and is the second largest district in Malaysia with a population of 1.8 million, as of 2023. The city's population today is a mixture of three main ethnicities – Malays, Chinese and Indians- along with other bumiputras. The Malays in Johor Bahru are strongly related to the neighbouring Riau Malays in Riau Islands, Indonesia with significant populations of Javanese, Bugis and Banjarese among the local Johorean Malay population. The Chinese mainly are from the majority Hokkien and Teochew (among the local Chinese) subgroups with minorities of Hakka, Cantonese, Henghua, Foochow and Hainanese among its local Chinese dominant minority populace, while the Indian community are majoritally Tamils (including Ceylonese), there are also small populations of Telugus, Malayalis, Gujaratis, Bengalis, Sindhis, Pashtuns and Sikh Punjabis among the Indian populace. The Malays are necessarily Muslims, while the Chinese are predominantly Buddhists/Taoists and the Indians are mostly Hindus/Buddhists despite there is also a small numbers from the two ethnic groups that are Christians and Muslims. A small number of Sikhs, Animists and secularists can also be found in the city.

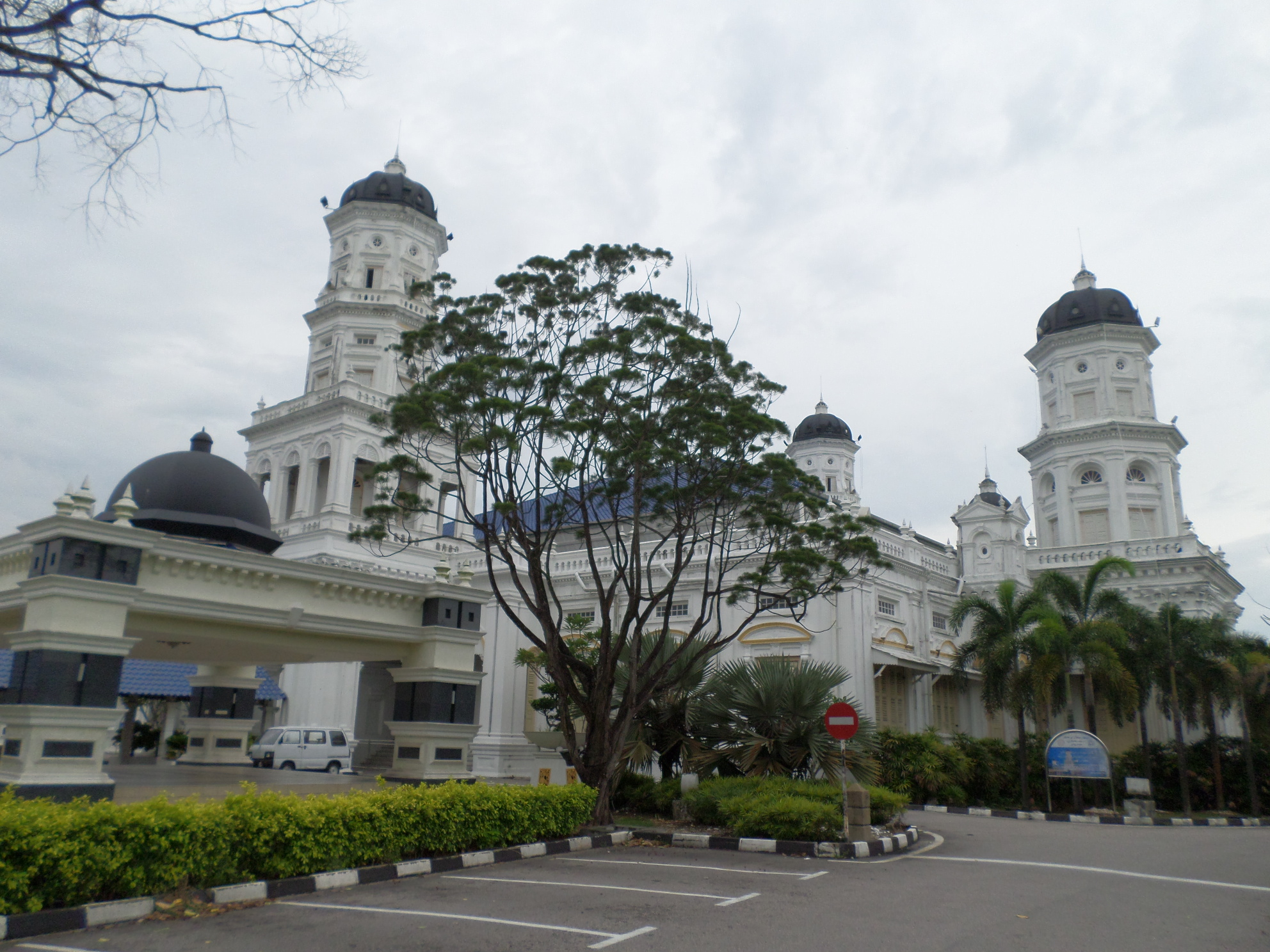
Sultan Abu Bakar State Mosque, the main mosque in the city.

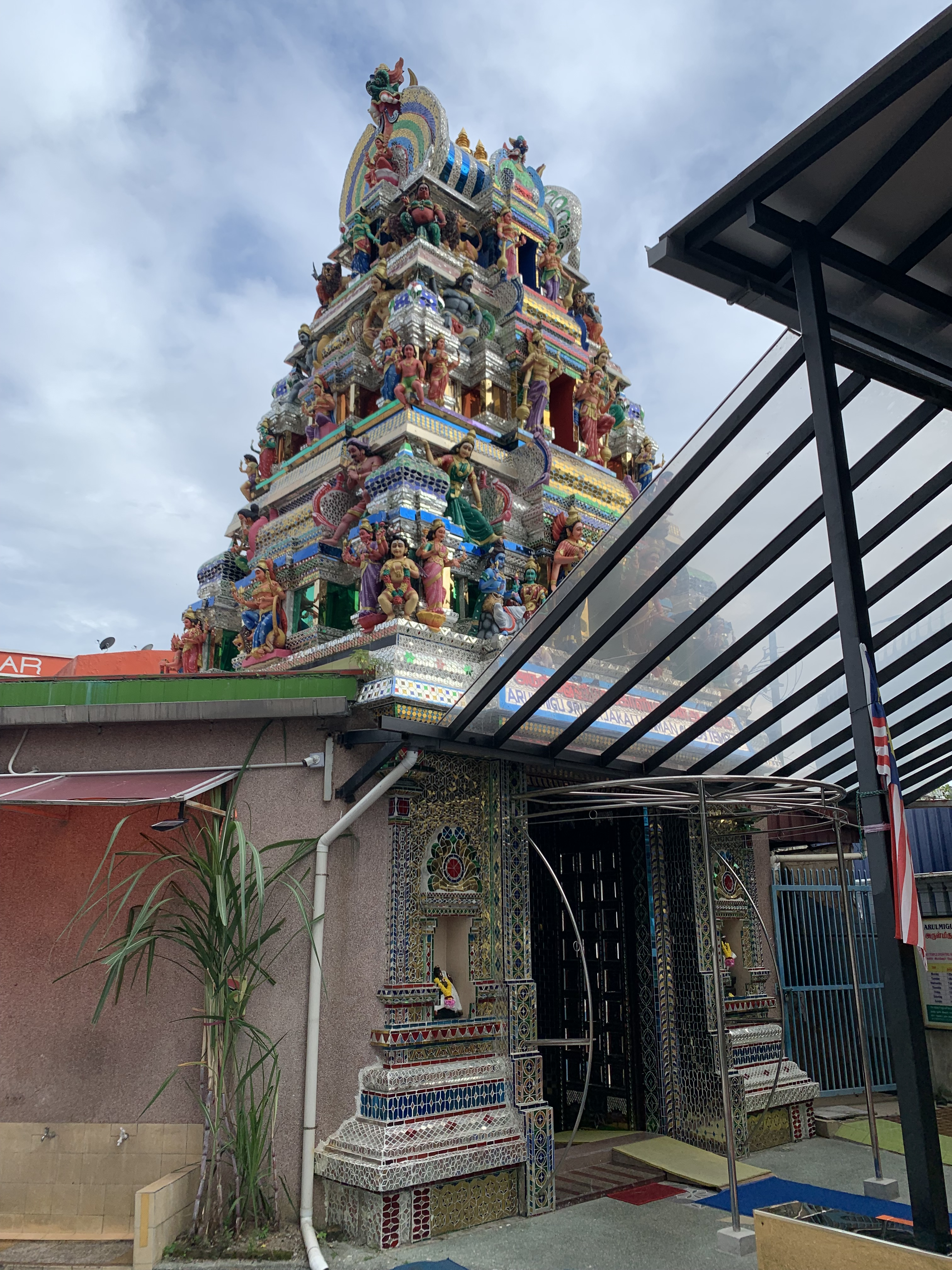
Arulmigu Sri Rajakaliamman Glass Temple, the world's first glass temple.

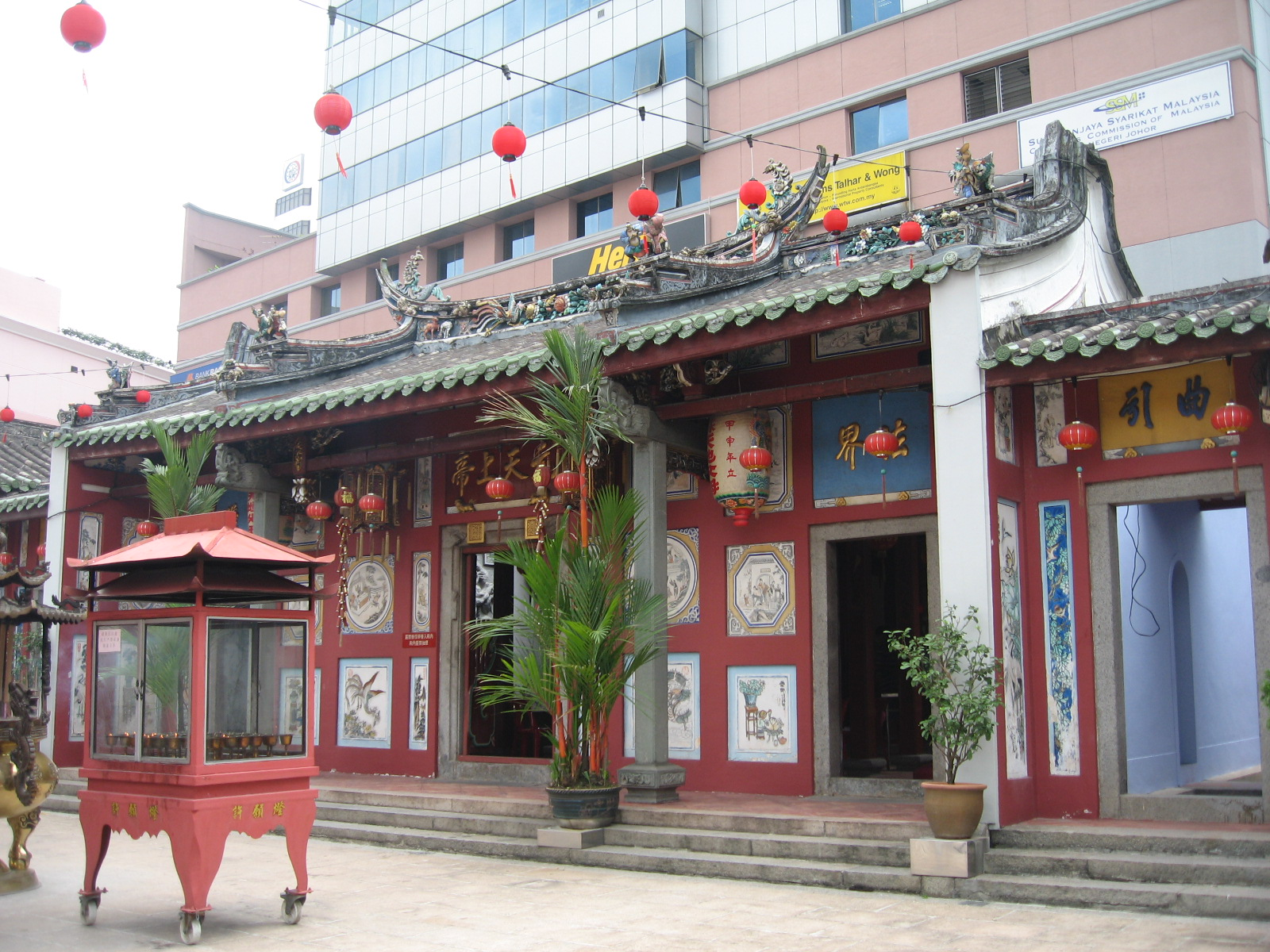
Johor Bahru Old Chinese Temple, the oldest Chinese temple in the city.

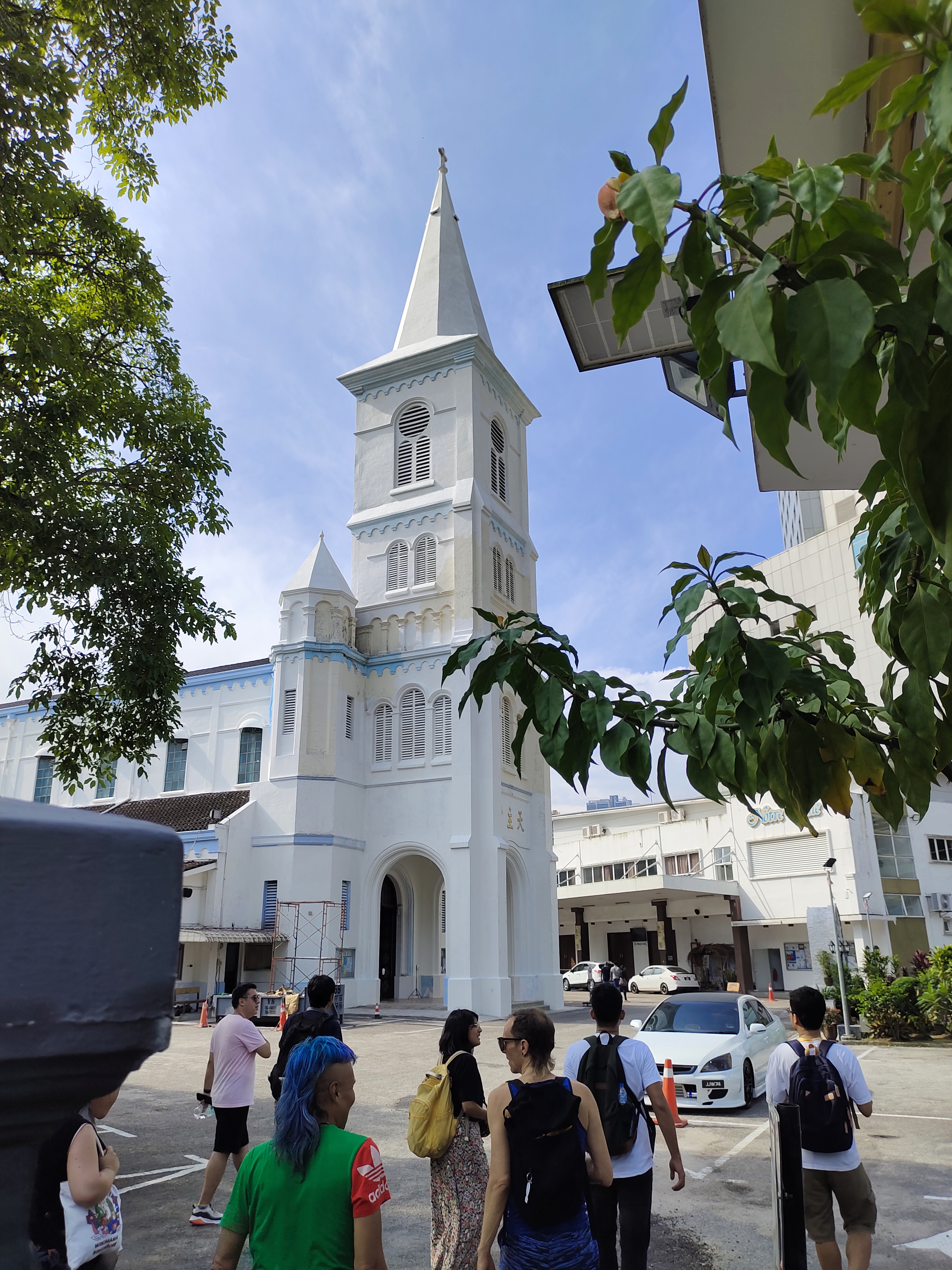
Church of the Immaculate Conception, the oldest church in the city.

=== Languages ===
The local ethnic Malays speak the Malay language, while the language primarily spoken by the local Chinese is Mandarin Chinese. The Chinese community is represented by several dialect groups: Hokkien and Teochew with small minorities of Foochow, Henghua, Hakka, Hainanese and Cantonese.

The Indian community predominantly speaks Tamil, with a minority of Malayalam, Telugu and Punjabi speakers. 60% of the city's population is fluent in English with a higher rate among younger people.

== Economy ==
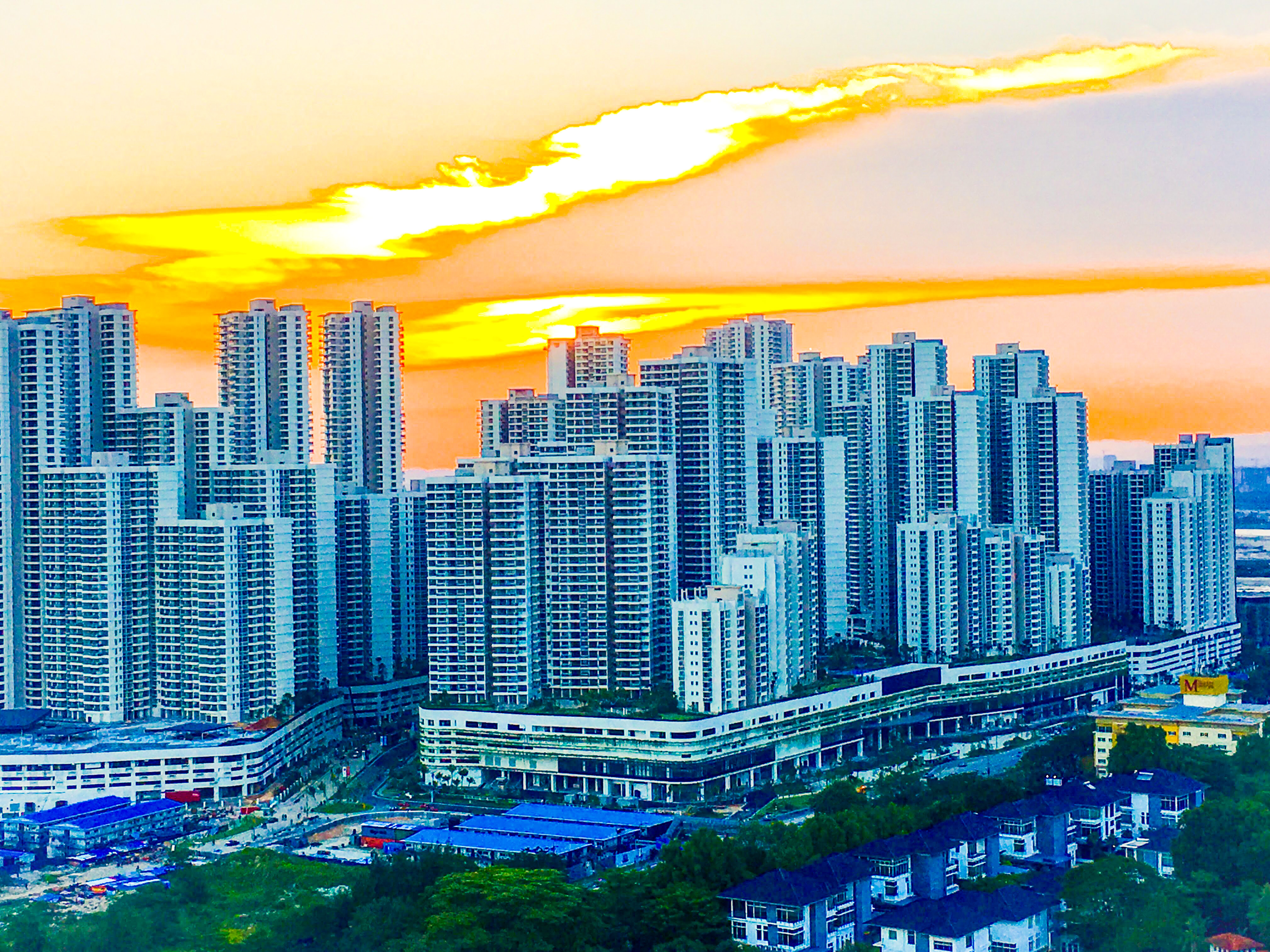
Skyline of Danga Bay

Johor Bahru is the fastest-growing city in terms of urbanisation in Malaysia, according to Euromonitor International. It is the main commercial centre for Johor and is located in the Indonesia–Malaysia–Singapore Growth Triangle. Johor Bahru is also the core city of Johor Bahru District, the second-largest district economy in Malaysia. It ranks second in the nation behind the capital, Kuala Lumpur, in terms of economic competitiveness and prosperity, according to the United Nations and Resonance, and is currently the 29th best Asian city, second in Malaysia after Kuala Lumpur.

It is classified as Zone A of Iskandar Malaysia, the nation's largest special economic zone by investment value. Under this flagship zone, Johor Bahru has been designated by the government to develop various economic activities, such as finance, commerce and retail, and hospitality. It is also the centre of arts and culture, hospitality, urban tourism, plastic manufacturing, electrical and electronics and food processing. The main shopping districts are located within the city, with a number of large shopping malls located in the suburbs.

Johor Bahru hosts numerous international conferences, congress and trade fairs, such as the Nikkei Forum, Eastern Regional Organisation for Planning and Housing and World Islamic Economic Forum. The city is the first in Malaysia to practise a low-carbon economy. In 2021, Johor Bahru was ranked 432nd globally in the Global City Lab's global cities report that assesses cities' economic brand values, the second in Malaysia after Kuala Lumpur.

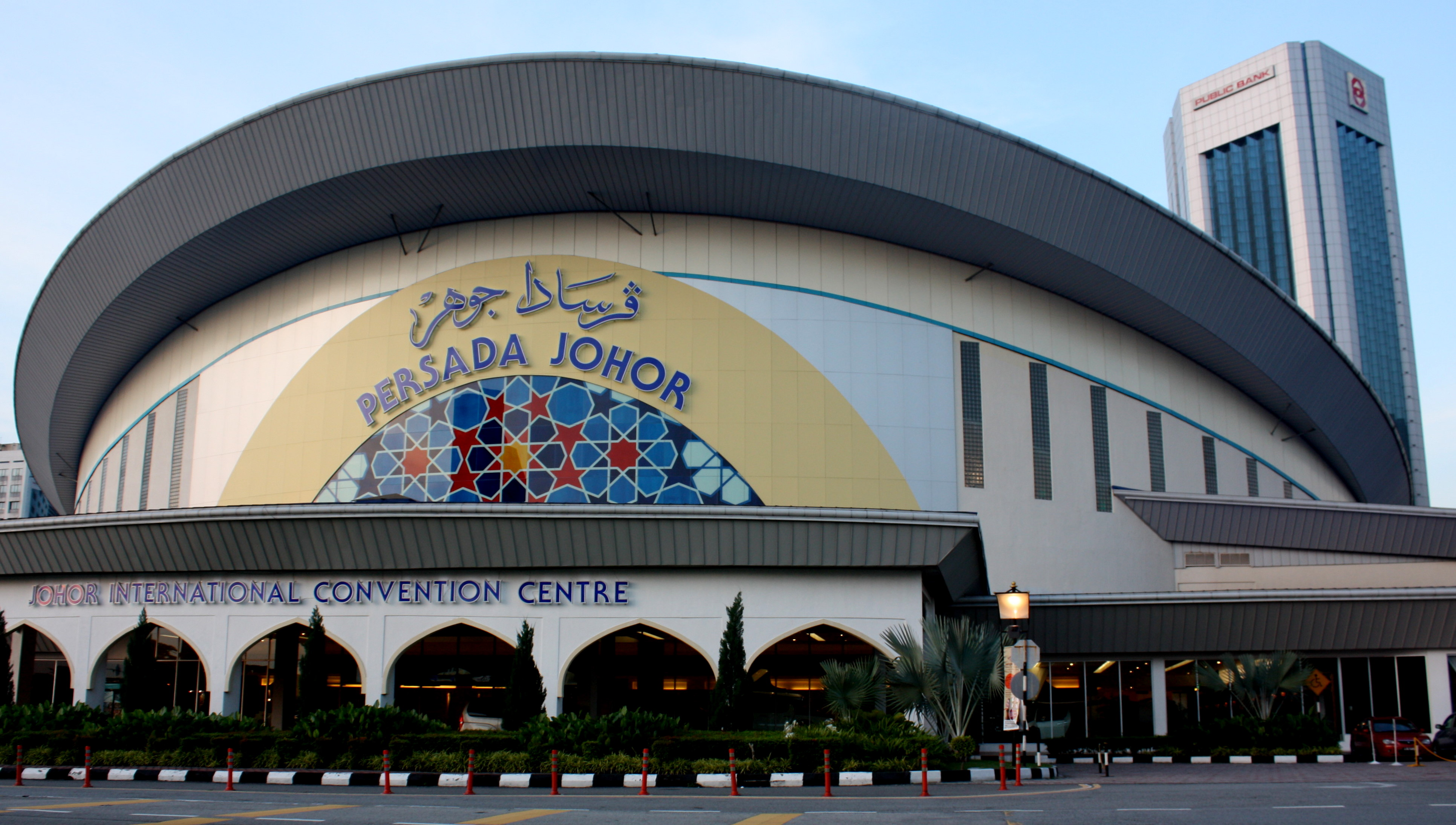
Persada Johor International Convention Centre, a major venue for business events in southern Peninsular Malaysia.

Tertiary-based industry dominates the economy with many international tourists from the regions visiting the city. The city has a very close economic relationship with Singapore. Many of the city's residents work in Singapore. Around 3,000 logistic lorries travel between Johor Bahru and Singapore every day for delivering goods and trading activities. Many residents in Singapore frequently visit the city; some of them have also chosen to live in the city. In 2025, Johor Bahru is ranked the world's 20th most attractive city for businesses, second in Malaysia after Kuala Lumpur, according to Oliver Wyman.

== Transportation ==
=== Land ===
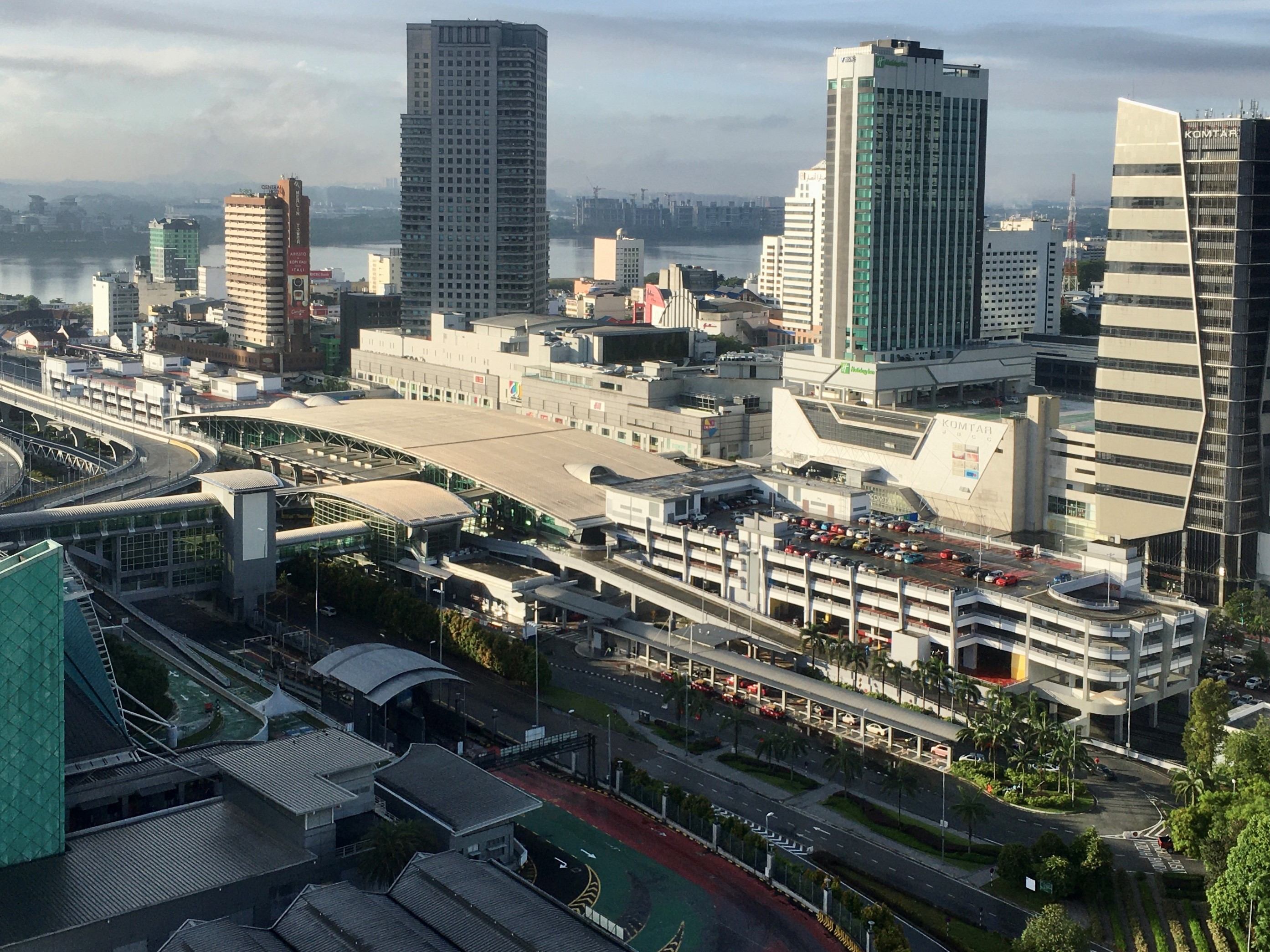
Johor Bahru Sentral, a busy domestic and international transportation hub.

Larkin Sentral, an intercity bus terminal.

The internal roads linking different parts of the city are mostly federal roads constructed and maintained by the Malaysian Public Works Department (JKR). There are five major highways linking the Johor Bahru Central Business District to outlying suburbs: the Tebrau Highway and Johor Bahru Eastern Dispersal Link Expressway in the northeast, Skudai Highway in the northwest, Iskandar Coastal Highway in the west and the Johor Bahru East Coast Highway in the east. The Pasir Gudang Highway and the connecting Johor Bahru Parkway both cross the Tebrau and Skudai Highways, which serve as the middle ring road of the metropolitan area.

The Johor Bahru Inner Ring Road, which connects with the Southern Integrated Gateway, aids in controlling the traffic in and around the central business district. Access to the national expressway system is provided through the North–South Expressway and the Senai–Desaru Expressway. The Johor–Singapore Causeway links the city to Woodlands, Singapore with a six-lane road and a single-track railway line terminating at the Southern Integrated Gateway.

==== Bus ====
Buses at JB Sentral Bus Terminal

The main bus terminals of the city are Johor Bahru Sentral (JB Sentral), and Larkin Sentral located in Larkin. Major local bus operators in the city are the Causeway Link, BAS.MY, Maju and S&S. Buses in Johor Bahru currently accept cashless payments such as credit cards, NFC using smartphone or smartwatch, and QR code payment, making it the first Malaysian city to support contactless payment using smart devices on urban bus network. Larkin Sentral has direct bus services to and from many destinations in West Malaysia, Thailand and Singapore, while Taman Johor Jaya and Ulu Tiram Bus Terminals serve local destinations.

Due to higher cost and longer implementation time, proposals for an LRT system was converted to autonomous rapid transit. In October 2025, the Johor Bahru Draft Local Plan 2035 was released, unveiling plans for four bus routes – the Skudai, Iskandar Puteri, Tebrau and Pasir Gudang Transit Corridors. In the long term, the routes will be converted into elevated autonomous rapid transit (ART) lines. Construction of an ART network was approved in May 2026, at a sum of RM10 billion.

==== Taxi ====
Two types of taxi services operate in the city; the main type is either in red and yellow, blue, green or just red while the larger, less common type is known as a limousine taxi, which is more comfortable but expensive. Most taxis in the city do not use their meter.

==== Railway ====
The city is served by two railway stations, JB Sentral and Kempas Baru. Operated by Keretapi Tanah Melayu (KTM), the stations serve intercity train services to Kuala Lumpur, Padang Besar and Tumpat. JB Sentral additionally serves the Shuttle Tebrau international service to Woodlands Train Checkpoint in Singapore, running along the Johor–Singapore Causeway.

Slated to open in January 2027, the under-construction Bukit Chagar station will serve the RTS Link. The new light rail line will replace the Shuttle Tebrau service as the new cross-border service to Singapore. It will also be the first light rail line in Malaysia outside the Klang Valley.

The Johor state government has acknowledged the high degree of traffic congestion within the city, and has been making plans for the implementation of a light rapid transit (LRT) or bus rapid transit (BRT) system since at least 2017. Johor's Chief Minister, Onn Hafiz Ghazi, acknowledged that "an efficient public transportation system in Johor Bahru is no longer a luxury but a necessity." Plans for an LRT system were, however, shelved in 2024. The government claimed that the long wait-time of five to seven years needed to complete an LRT network was prohibitive, given the city's pressing need for a public transport network as soon as possible, owing to the opening of the RTS Link in 2027. Instead, they opted for an elevated autonomous rapid transit (ART) network. However, there remain calls for a high-capacity rail system to serve the busiest corridor of the city.

=== Air ===
The city is served by Senai International Airport located at the neighbouring Senai town and connected through Skudai Highway. Five airlines, AirAsia (and its subsidiaries Indonesia AirAsia and Thai AirAsia), Firefly, Malaysia Airlines, Batik Air Malaysia and TransNusa, provide flights domestically as well as international flights to Guangzhou, Jakarta Soekarno–Hatta, Surabaya, Hồ Chí Minh City, Kunming and Bangkok Don Mueang.

Changi Airport is 36.3 kilometres (22.6 mi) southeast of the city centre, across the border in Singapore, and is linked by a frequent cross-border coach service operated by Transtar Travel.

=== Sea ===
Boat services are available to ports in Batam and Bintan Islands in Indonesia from Stulang Laut Ferry Terminal, located near the suburb of Stulang. The city is also served by the Ports of Johor, which is currently the 11th-busiest port in the world, and the largest transshipment hub in Malaysia.

== Other utilities ==
=== Healthcare ===
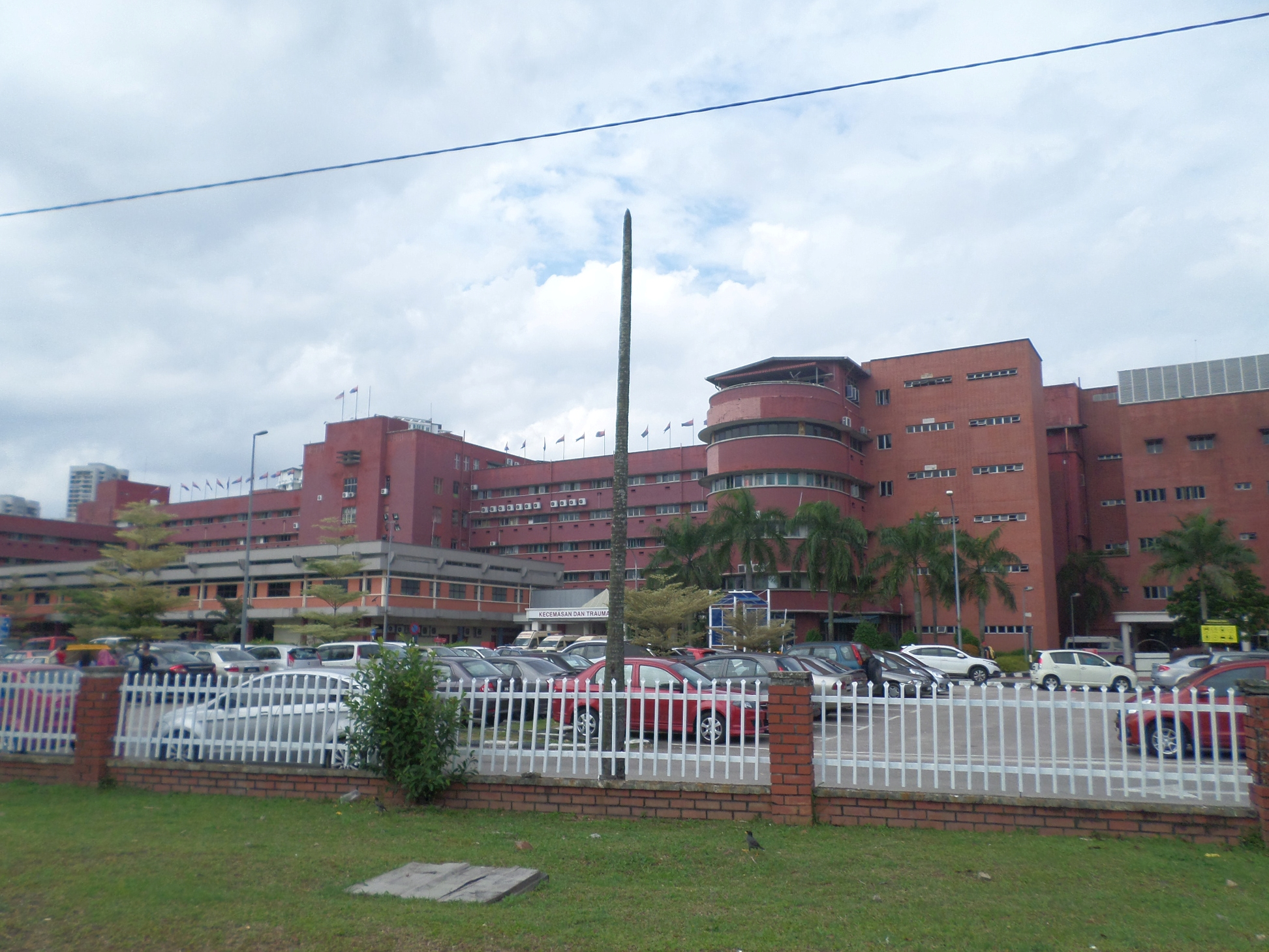
Sultanah Aminah Hospital

There are three public hospitals, four health clinics and thirteen 1Malaysia clinics in Johor Bahru. Sultanah Aminah Hospital, which is located along Persiaran Road, is the largest public hospital in Johor Bahru as well as in Johor with 989 beds. Another government funded hospital is the Sultan Ismail Specialist Hospital with 700 beds. Another large private health facility is the KPJ Puteri Specialist Hospital with 158 beds. Further healthcare facilities are currently being expanded to improve healthcare services in the city.

=== Education ===
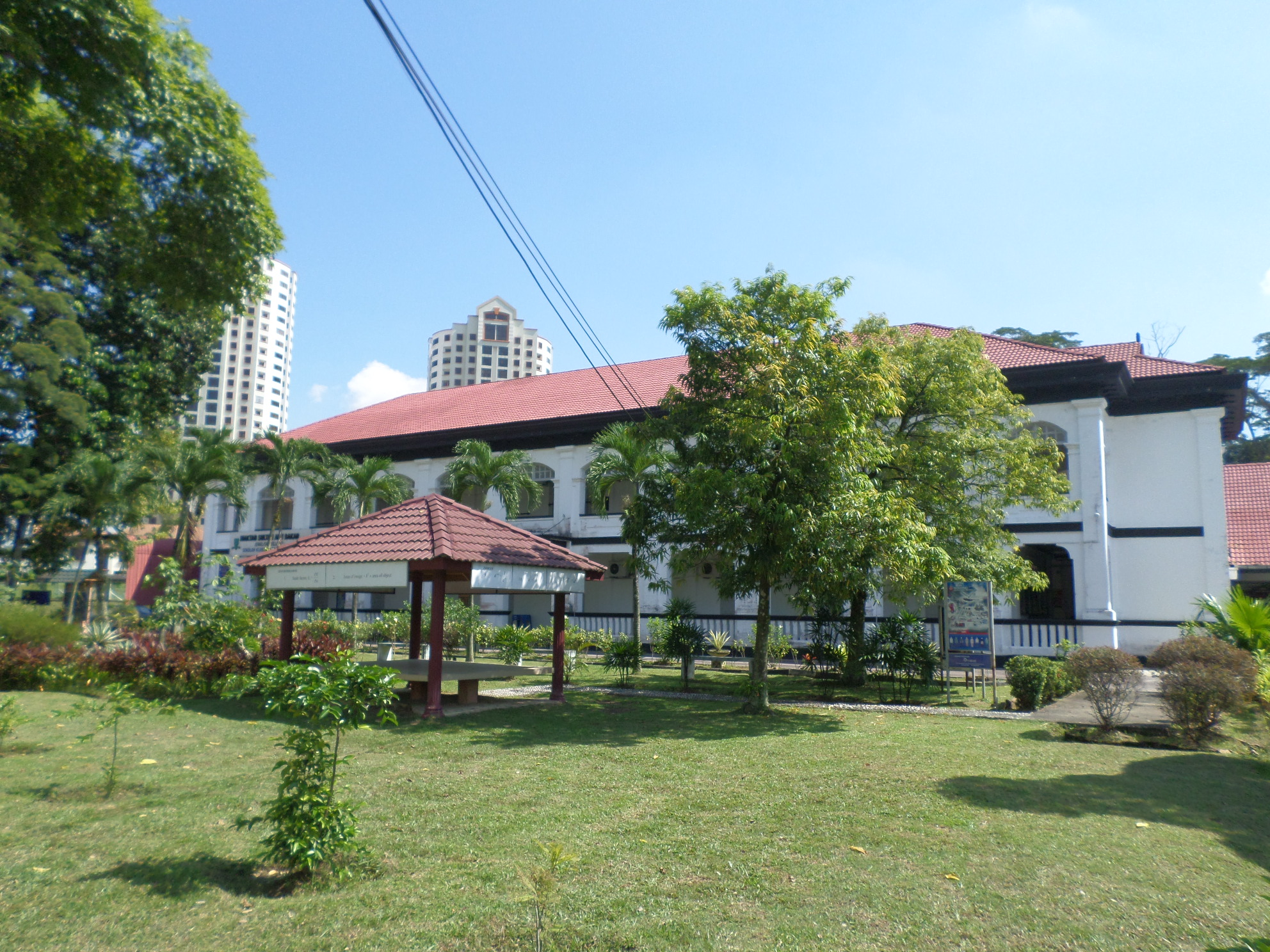
English College Johore Bahru, one of the oldest English institutions in Malaysia.

Many government or state schools are available in the city. The secondary schools include English College Johore Bahru, Sekolah Menengah Kebangsaan Engku Aminah, Sekolah Menengah Kebangsaan Sultan Ismail, Sekolah Menengah Infant Jesus Convent, Sekolah Menengah Kebangsaan (Perempuan) Sultan Ibrahim and Sekolah Menengah Saint Joseph. There are also a number of international schools in the city. These include Marlborough College Malaysia, Shattuck-St. Mary's Forest City International School, Raffles American School, Sunway International School. The other private universities are Monash University Malaysia (Clinical School), City University Malaysia, Newcastle University Medicine Malaysia, University of Reading Malaysia, University of Southampton Malaysia, and others. There are also a number of private college campuses and one polytechnic operating in the city; these are Crescendo International College, KPJ College, Olympia College, Sunway College Johor Bahru, Taylor's College and College of Islamic Studies Johor.

==== Libraries ====
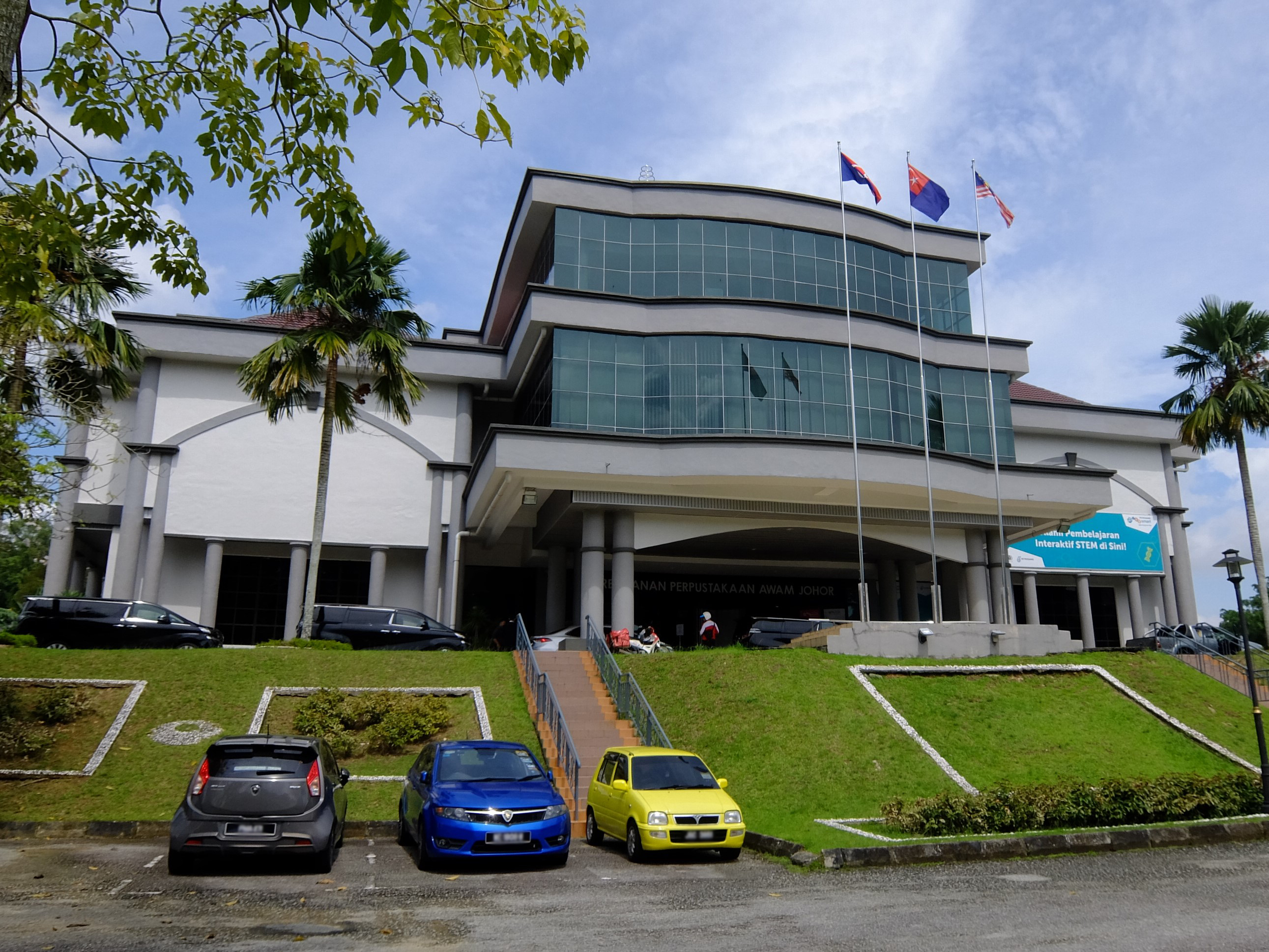
Johor State Library

The Johor State Library, also known as the Johor Public Library Corporation headquarters, is the main library in the state, located off Yahya Awal Road. Another public library branch is the University Park in Kebudayaan Road, while there are other libraries or private libraries in schools, colleges, and universities. Two village libraries are available in the district of Johor Bahru.

== Attractions and culture ==
=== Attractions and recreation spots ===
Johor Bahru was ranked the world's 39th most visited city by international tourists, according to Euromonitor International in 2019, making it Malaysia's second most visited city by international tourists, only after Kuala Lumpur.

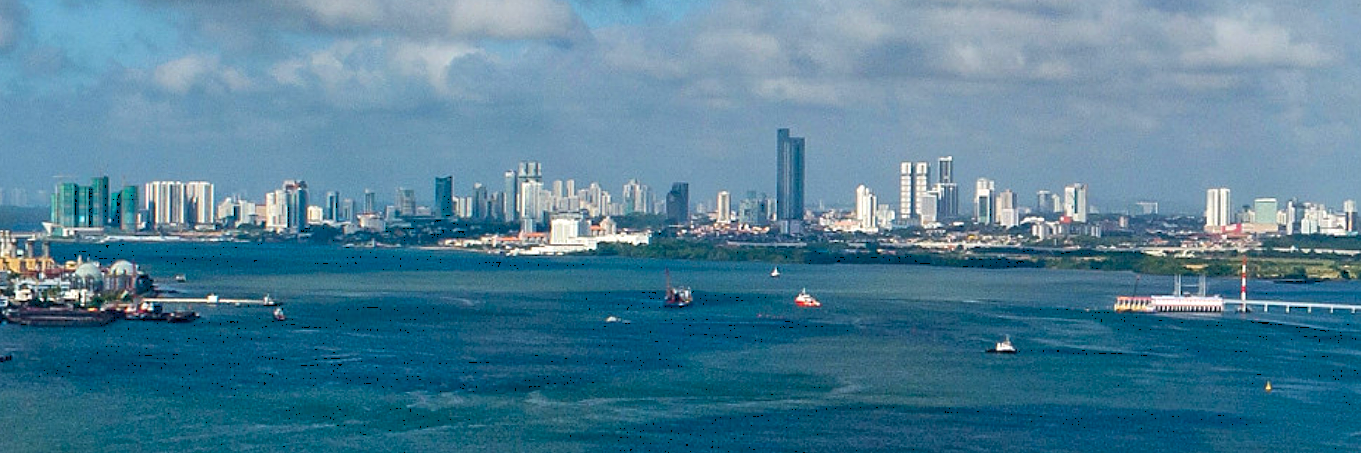
City centre skyline of Johor Bahru, as of 2023.

==== Cultural attractions ====
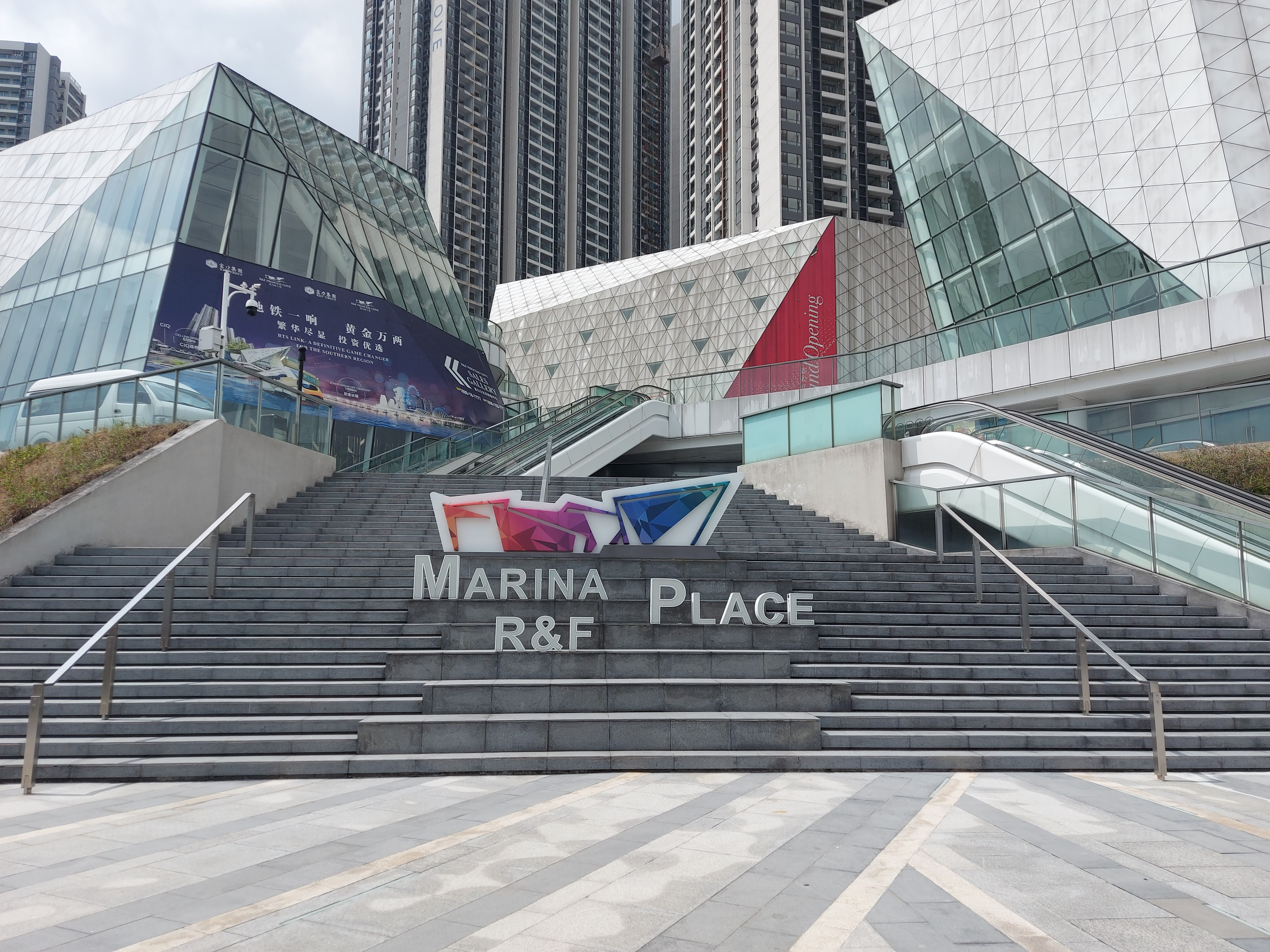
Permaisuri Zarith Sofiah Opera House, the first international opera house in Johor.

There are a number of cultural attractions in Johor Bahru. The Royal Abu Bakar Museum located within the Grand Palace building is the main museum in the city. The Johor Bahru Kwong Siew Heritage located in Wong Ah Fook Street housed the former Cantonese clan house that was donated by Wong Ah Fook. The Foon Yew High School houses many historical documents of the city history with a Chinese cultural heritage. The Johor Bahru Chinese Heritage Museum on Ibrahim Road includes the history of Chinese migration to Johor along with a collection of documents, photos, and other artefacts.

The Johor Art Gallery in Petrie Road is a house gallery built in 1910, known as the house for the former third Chief Minister of Johor, Abdullah Jaafar. The house features old architecture and became the centre for the collection of artefacts related to Johor's cultural history since its renovation in 2000.

==== Chingay parade ====
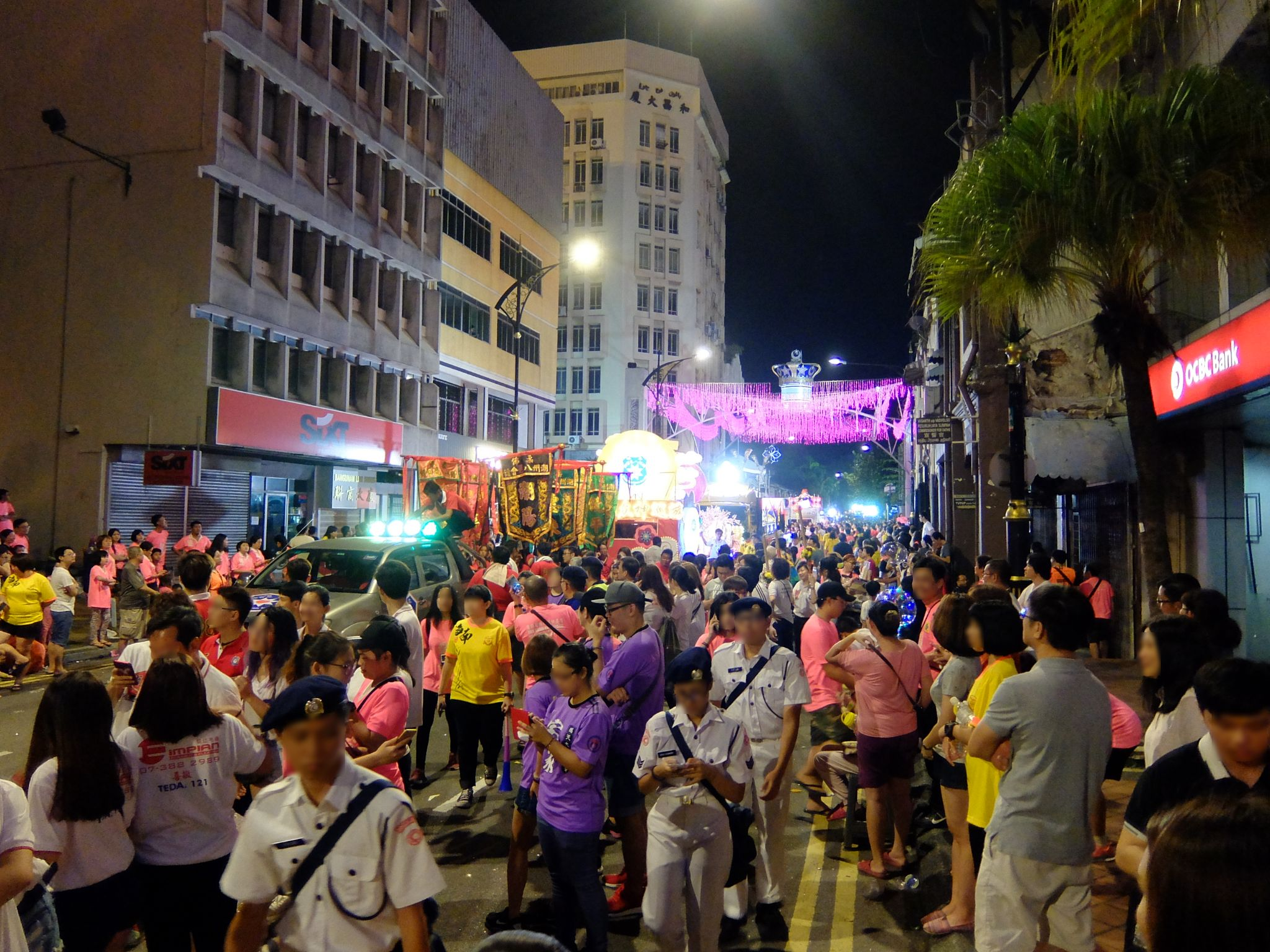
Chingay parade in 2018

The Chinese community holds the Chingay parade annually by the Johor Bahru Old Chinese Temple, which unites the five Chinese ethnic groups in Johor, namely Cantonese, Hainanese, Hakka, Hoklo and Teochew. This co-operation among different Chinese cultures under a voluntary organisation became a symbol of harmony among the different Chinese people that deepens their sense of heritage to preserve their cultural traditions. The Johor Bahru Chinese Heritage Museum describes the history of Chinese migration into Johor from the 14th to 19th centuries during the Ming and Qing dynasties. The ruler of Johor encouraged the Chinese community to plant gambier and pepper in the interior. Many of these farmers switched to pineapple cultivation in the 20th century, making Johor one of Malaysia's top fruit producers.

==== Historical attractions ====
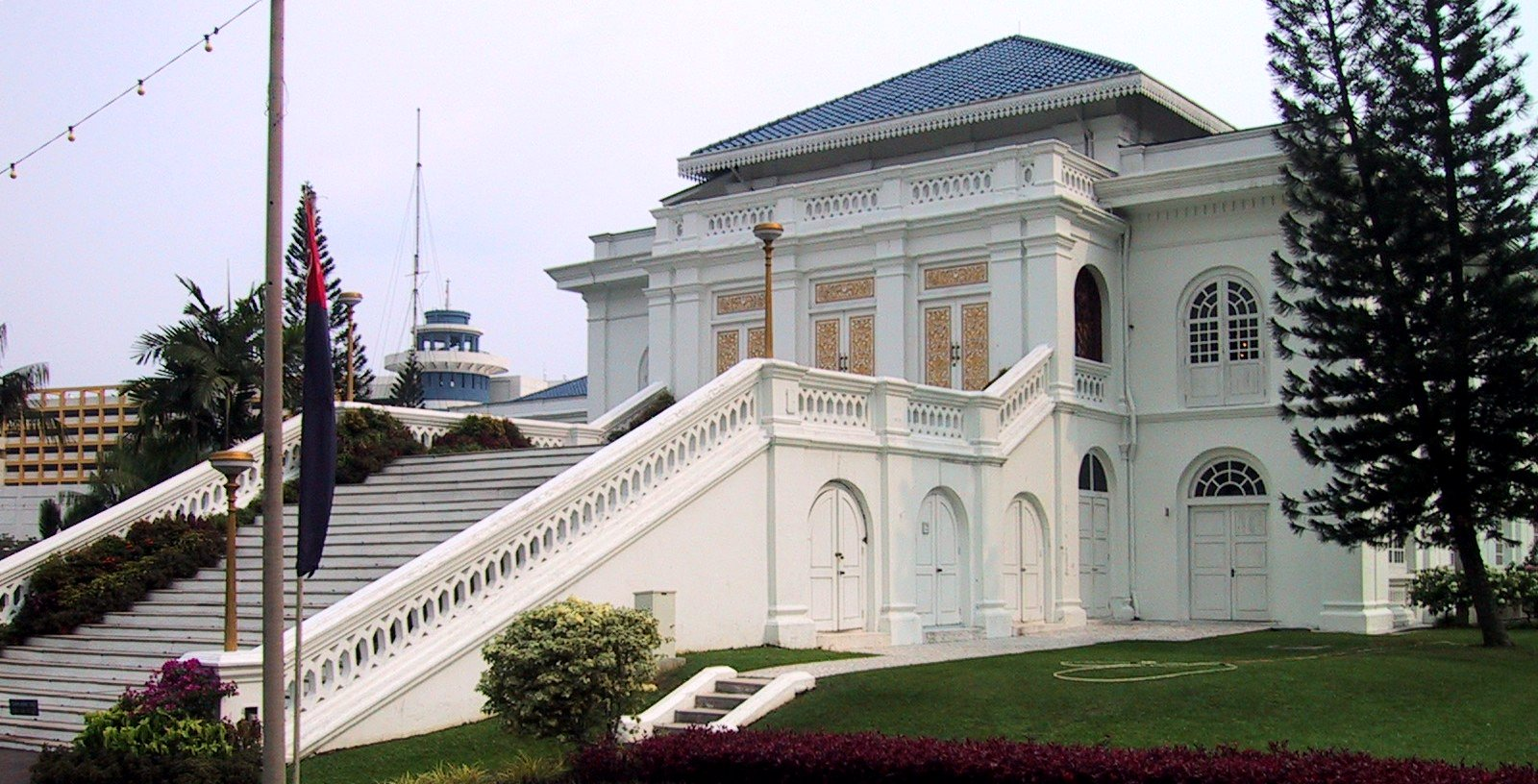
The Grand Palace, one of the important historical buildings in the city.

The Grand Palace is one of the historical attractions in the city, and is an example of Victorian-style architecture with a garden. Figure Museum is another historical colonial building since 1886 which ever become the house for the Johor first Menteri Besar Jaafar Muhammad; it is located on the top of Smile Hill (Bukit Senyum). The English College (now Maktab Sultan Abu Bakar) established in 1914 was located close to the Sungai Chat Palace before being moved to its present location at Sungai Chat Road; some of the ruins are visible at the old site. The Sultan Ibrahim Building is another historical building in the city; built in 1936 by British architect Palmer and Turner, it was the centre of the administration of Johor as since the relocation from Telok Blangah in Singapore, the Johor government never had its own building. Before the current railway station was built, there was Johor Bahru railway station (formerly Wooden Railway) which has now been turned into a museum after serving for 100 years since the British colonial era.

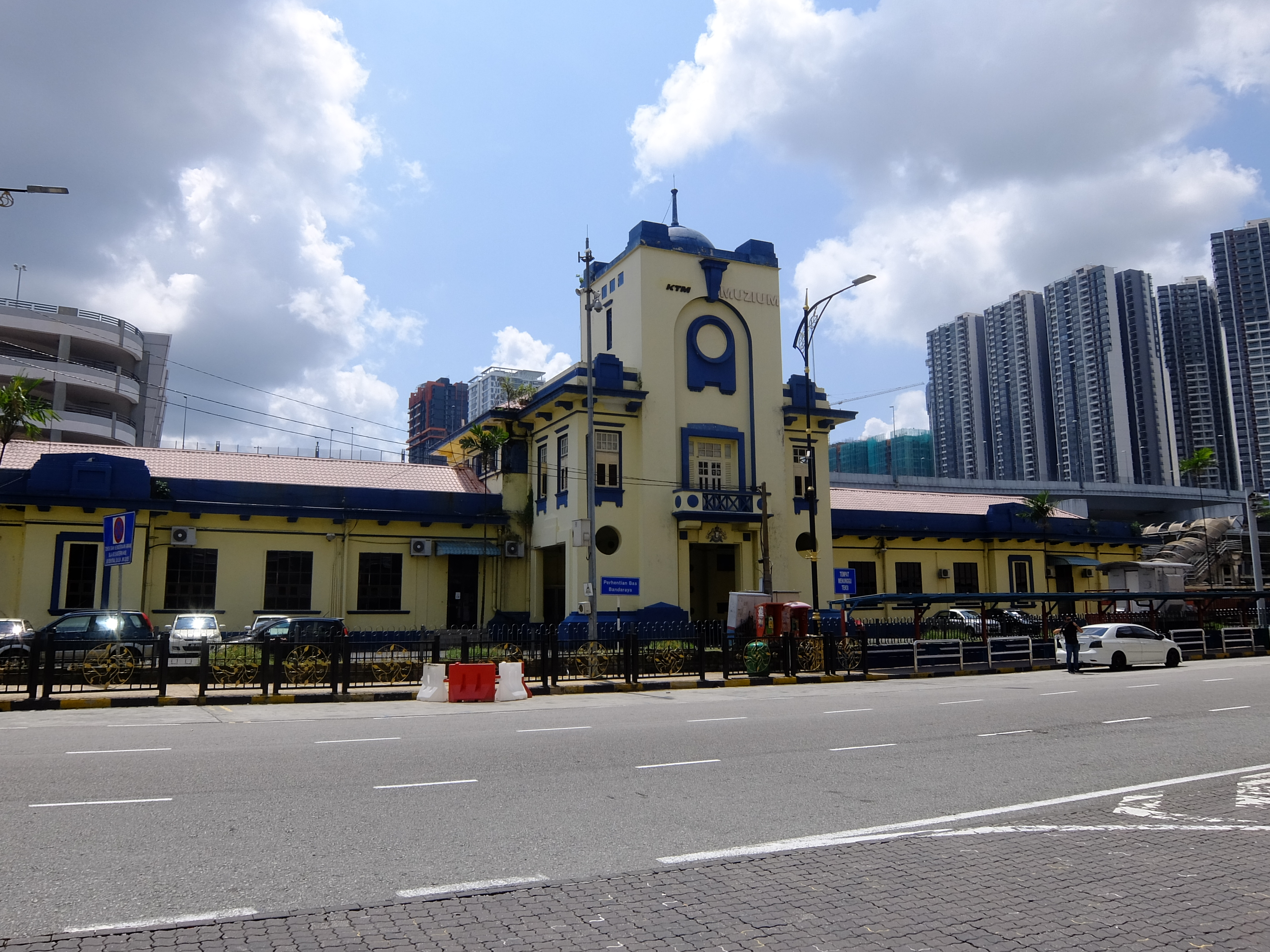
Johor Bahru railway station, now a museum, had served for 100 years before being replaced by the new Johor Bahru Sentral.

Sultan Abu Bakar State Mosque, located along Skudai Road, is the main and the oldest mosque in the state. It was built with a combination of Victorian, Moorish and Malay architectures. The Johor Bahru Old Chinese Temple, which is the oldest Chinese temple in the city, is located on the Trus Road, dedicated to the Five Patron Deities from the five Southern Chinese Clans (Hokkien, Teochew, Hakka, Cantonese & Hainanese) in the city. It was built in 1875 and renovated by the Persekutuan Tiong Hua Johor Bahru (Johor Bahru Tiong Hua Association) in 1994–95 with the addition of a small L-shaped museum in one corner of the square premises. The Wong Ah Fook Mansion, the home of the late Wong Ah Fook, was a former historical attraction. It stood for more than 150 years but was demolished illegally by its owner in 2014 to make way for a commercial housing development without informing the state government. Other historical religious buildings include the Arulmigu Sri Rajakaliamman Hindu Temple, which is the first glass temple in the world, Sri Raja Mariamman Hindu Temple, Gurdwara Sahib and Church of the Immaculate Conception.

==== Leisure and conservation areas ====
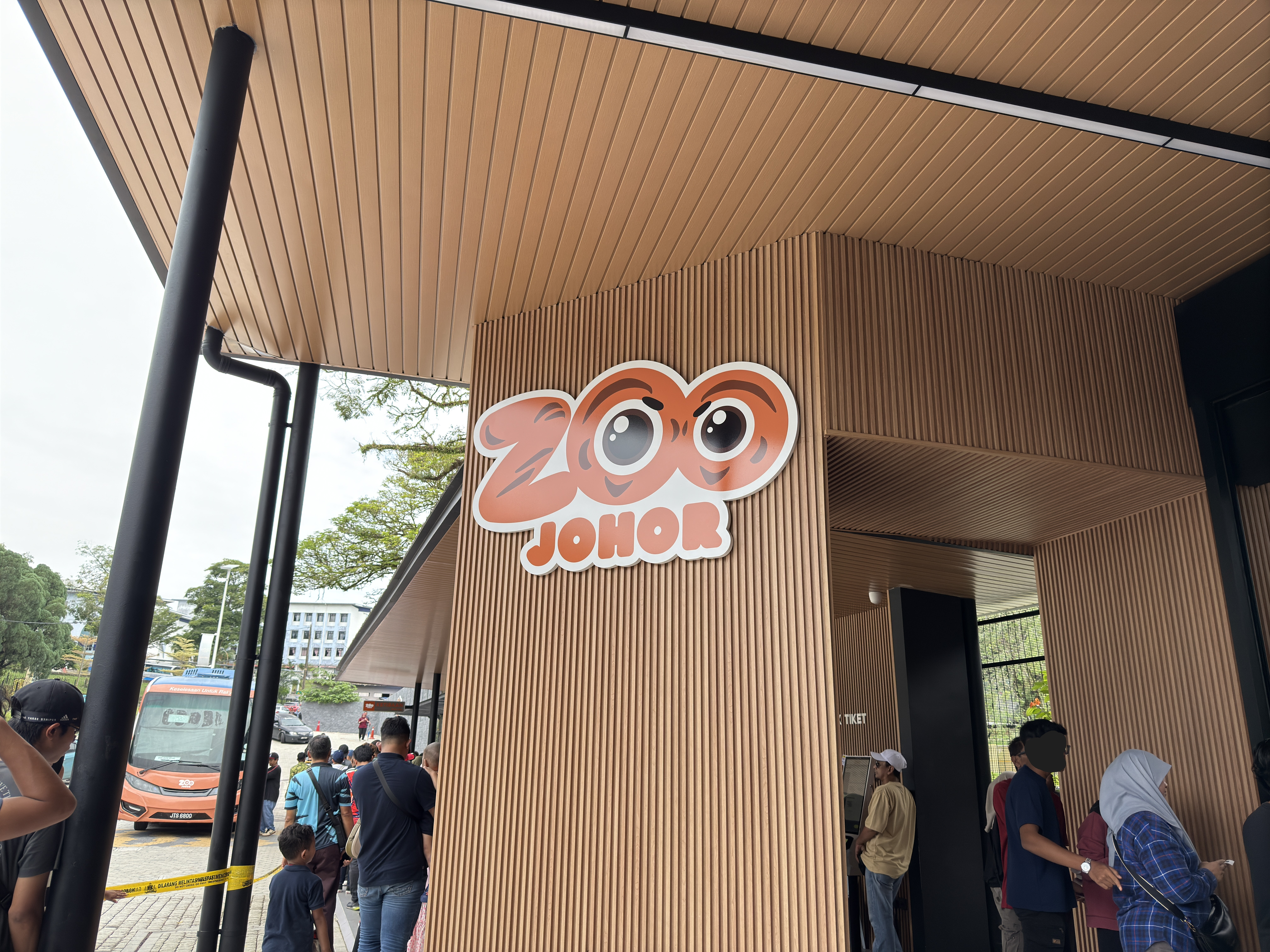
Johor Zoo, one of the oldest zoos in Asia.

The Danga Bay is a 25 kilometres (16 mi) area of recreational waterfront. There are around 15 established golf courses, of which two offer 36-hole facilities; most of these are located within resorts. The city also features several paintball parks which are also used for off-road motorsports activities.

The Johor Zoo is the oldest zoo in Malaysia and one of the oldest in Asia, built in 1928. It covers 4 hectares (9.9 acres) of land, it was originally called "animal garden" before being handed to the state government for renovation in 1962. The zoo has around 100 species of animals, including wild cats, camels, chimpanzees, gorillas, orangutans, and tropical birds. Visitors can participate in activities such as horse riding or using pedalos. The largest park in the city is the Independence Park.

==== Other attractions ====
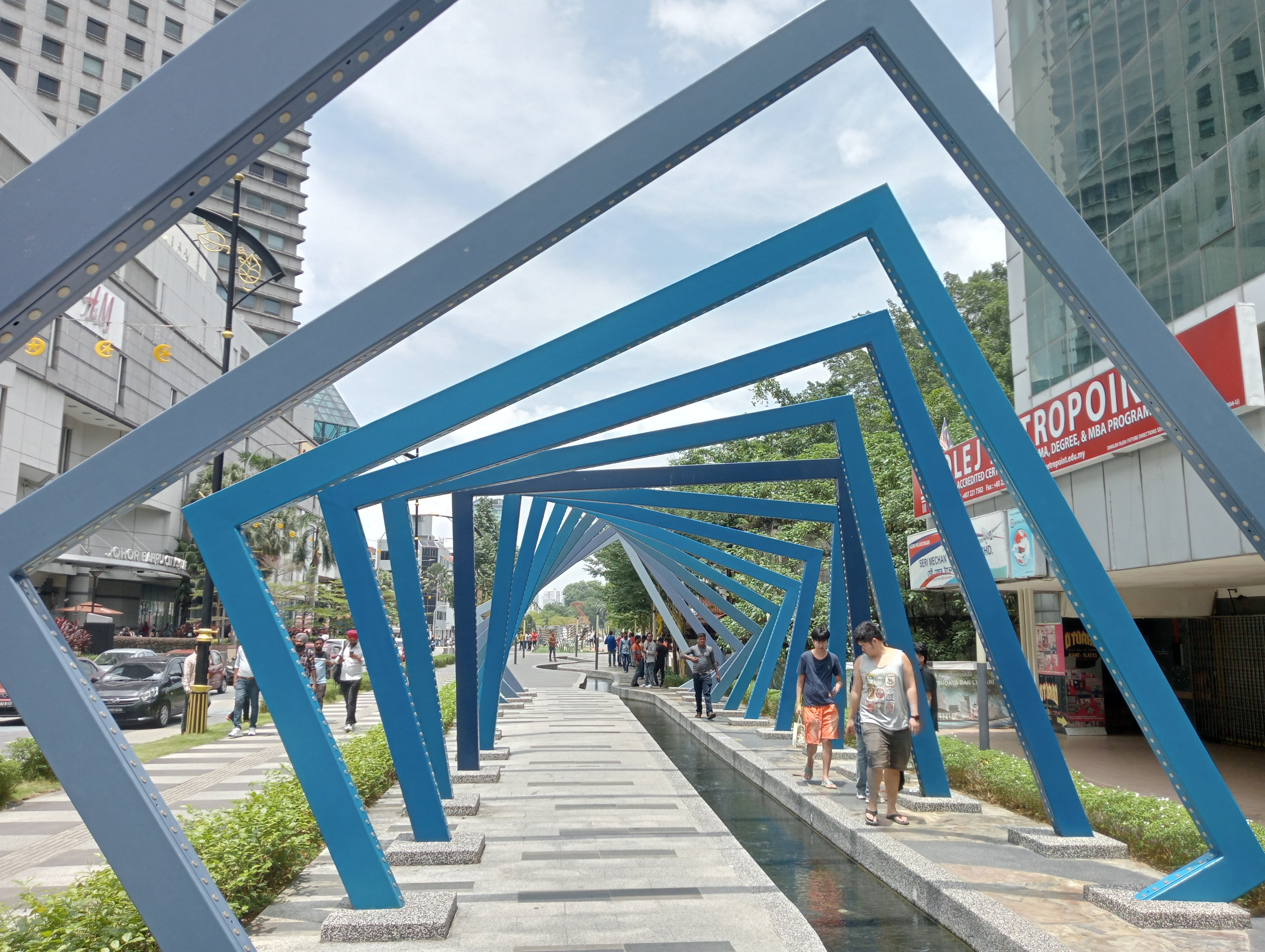
Wong Ah Fook Street, one of the major cultural and food streets in the city.

Dataran Bandaraya was built after Johor Bahru was proclaimed as a city. The site features a clock tower, fountain and a large field. The Wong Ah Fook Street is named after Wong Ah Fook. The Tan Hiok Nee Street is named after Tan Hiok Nee, who was the leader of the former Ngee Heng Kongsi, a secret society in Johor Bahru. Together with the Dhoby Street, both are part of a trail known as Old Buildings Road; they feature a mixture of Chinese and Indian heritages, reflected by their forms of ethnic business and architecture.

==== Shopping ====
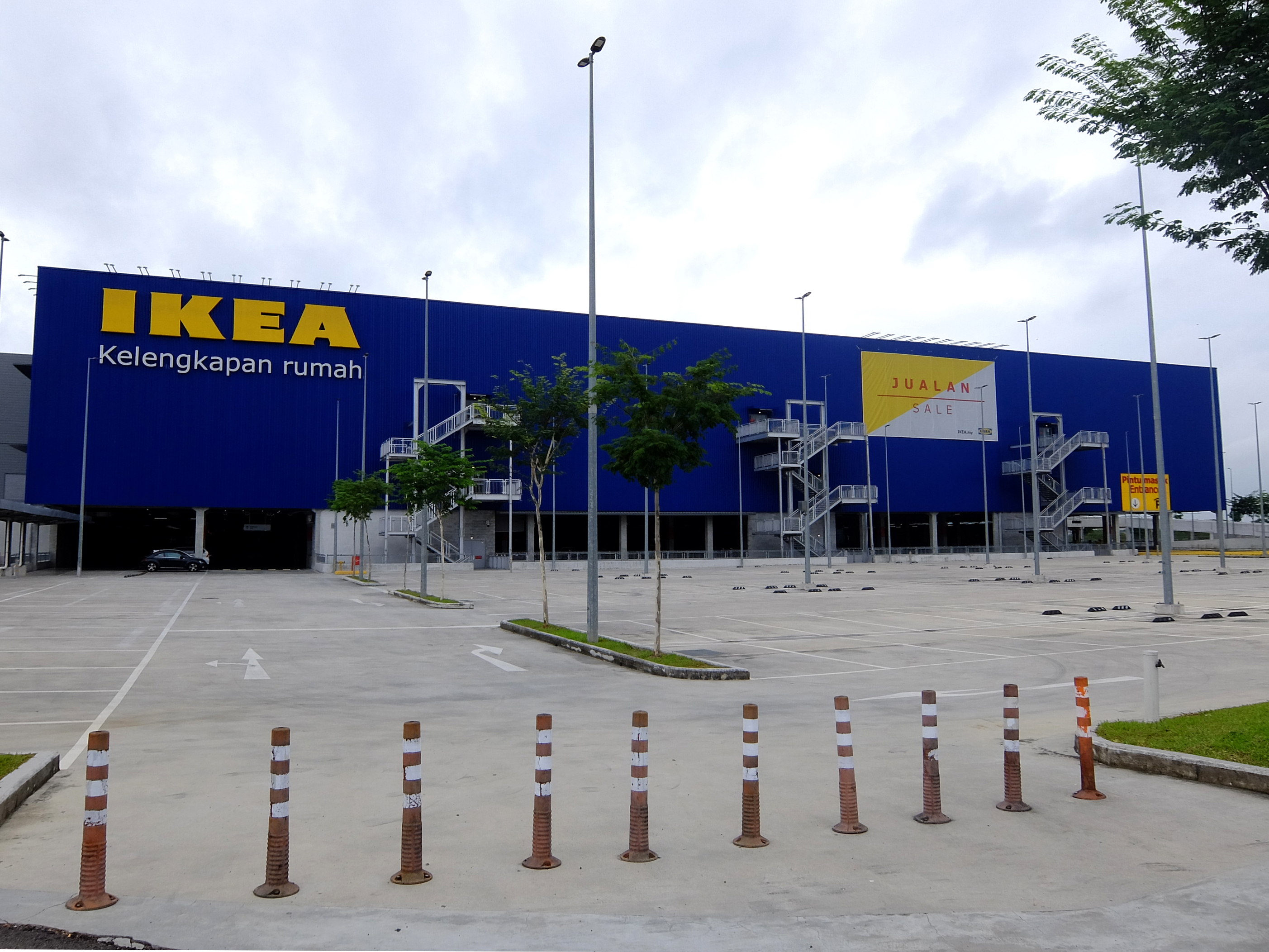
IKEA Tebrau, the largest IKEA store in Malaysia and once the largest in Southeast Asia.

The Mawar Handicrafts Centre, a government-funded exhibition and sales centre, is located along the Sungai Chat road and sells various batik and songket clothes. Opposite this is the Johor Area Rehabilitation Organisation (JARO) Handicrafts Centre which sells items such as hand-made cane furniture, soft toys and rattan baskets made by the physically disabled.

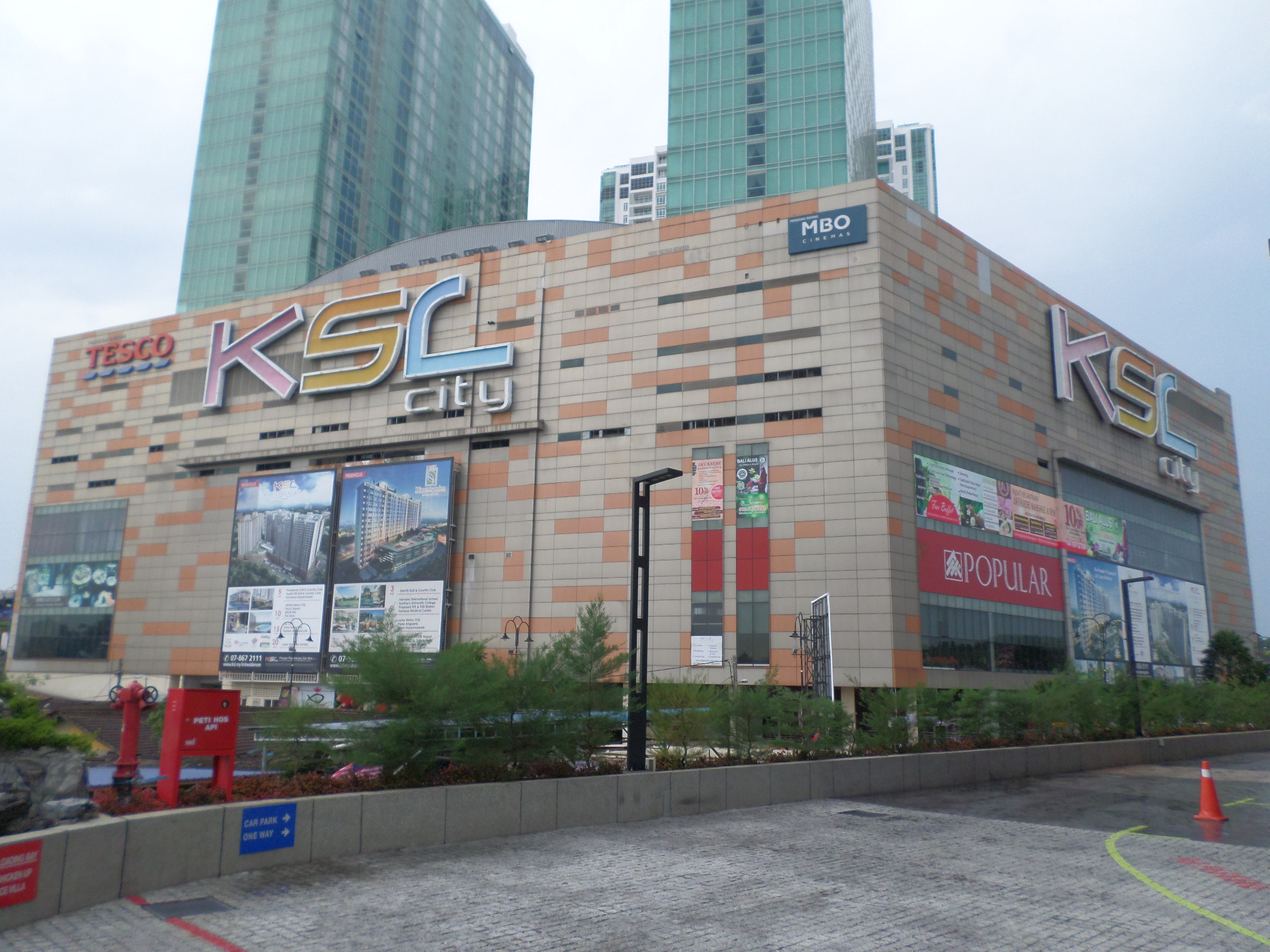
KSL City Mall

As of 2024, Johor has the most shopping centres out of any state in Malaysia, with a total of 156 within the state—primarily concentrated within Johor Bahru. Some prominent shopping centres in the city include Mid Valley Southkey, Paradigm Mall Johor Bahru, Toppen Shopping Centre, IKEA Tebrau, AEON Mall Tebrau City, Johor Bahru City Square, and others.

==== Entertainment ====
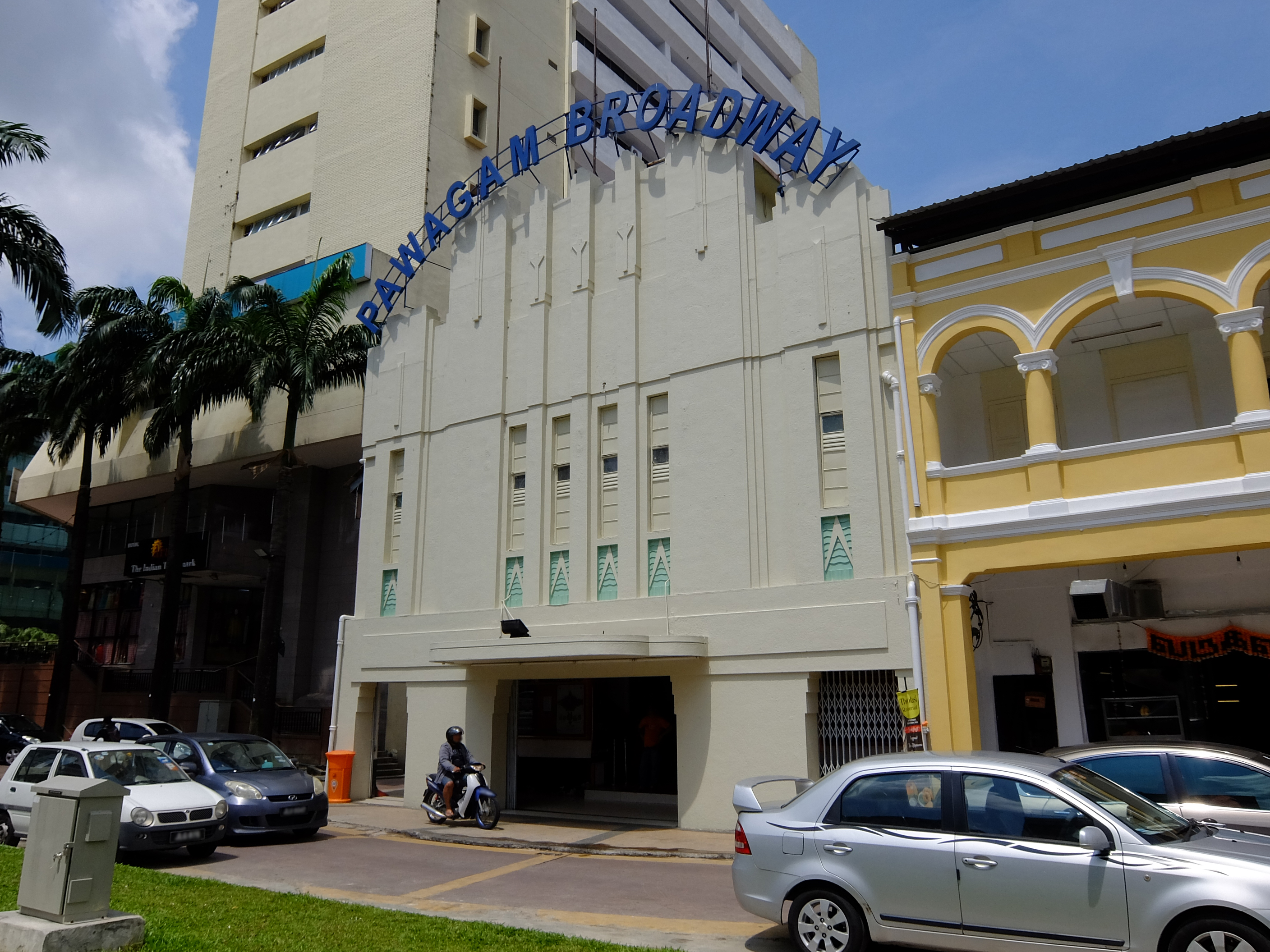
Broadway Theatre

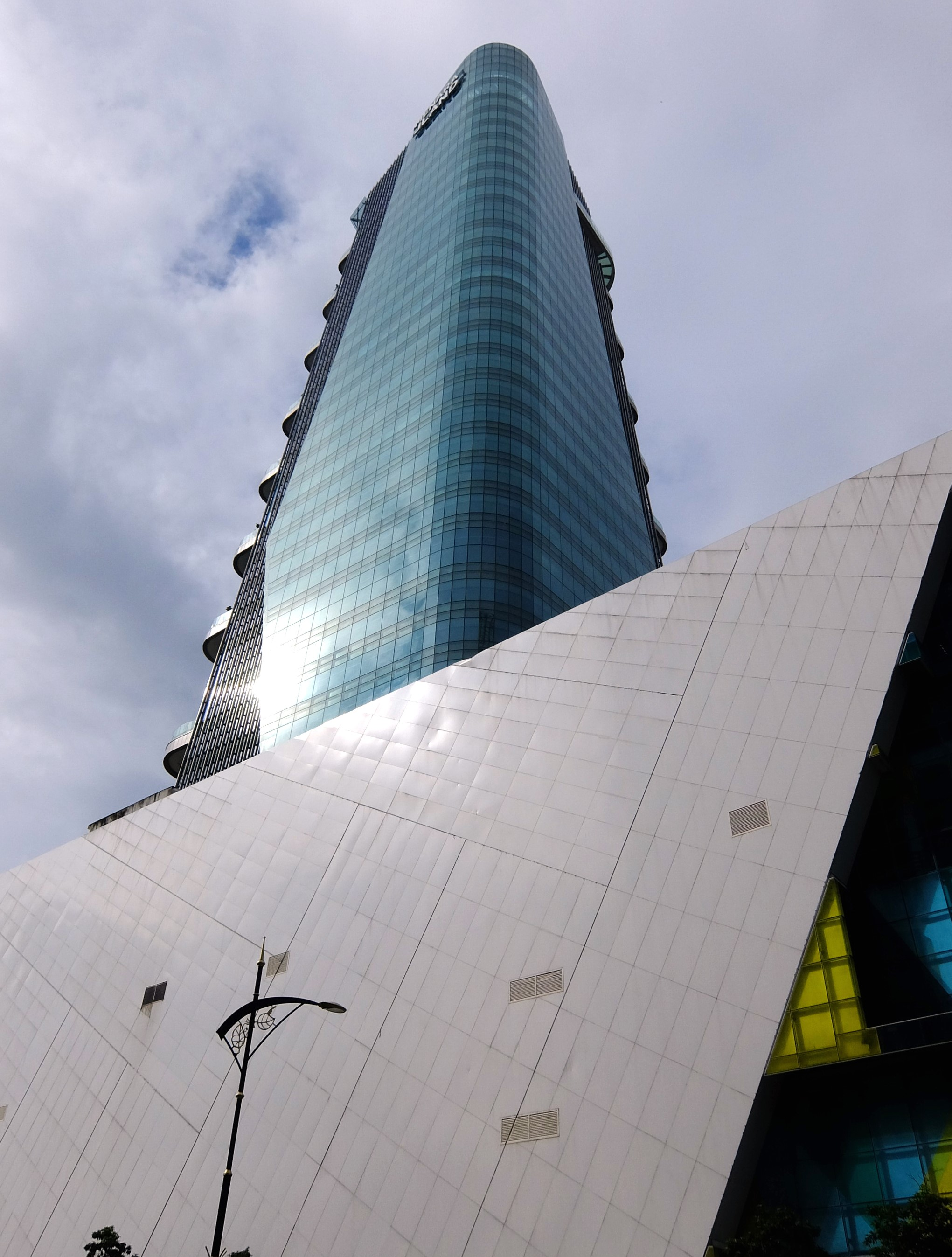
Observation deck in JLand Tower.

The oldest cinema in the city was the Broadway Theatre which mostly screened Tamil and Hindi movies. Other cinemas available in the city located inside shopping malls. JLand Tower, located in the city centre, also features a glass-floored skybridge and the city's tallest observation deck.

=== Sports ===
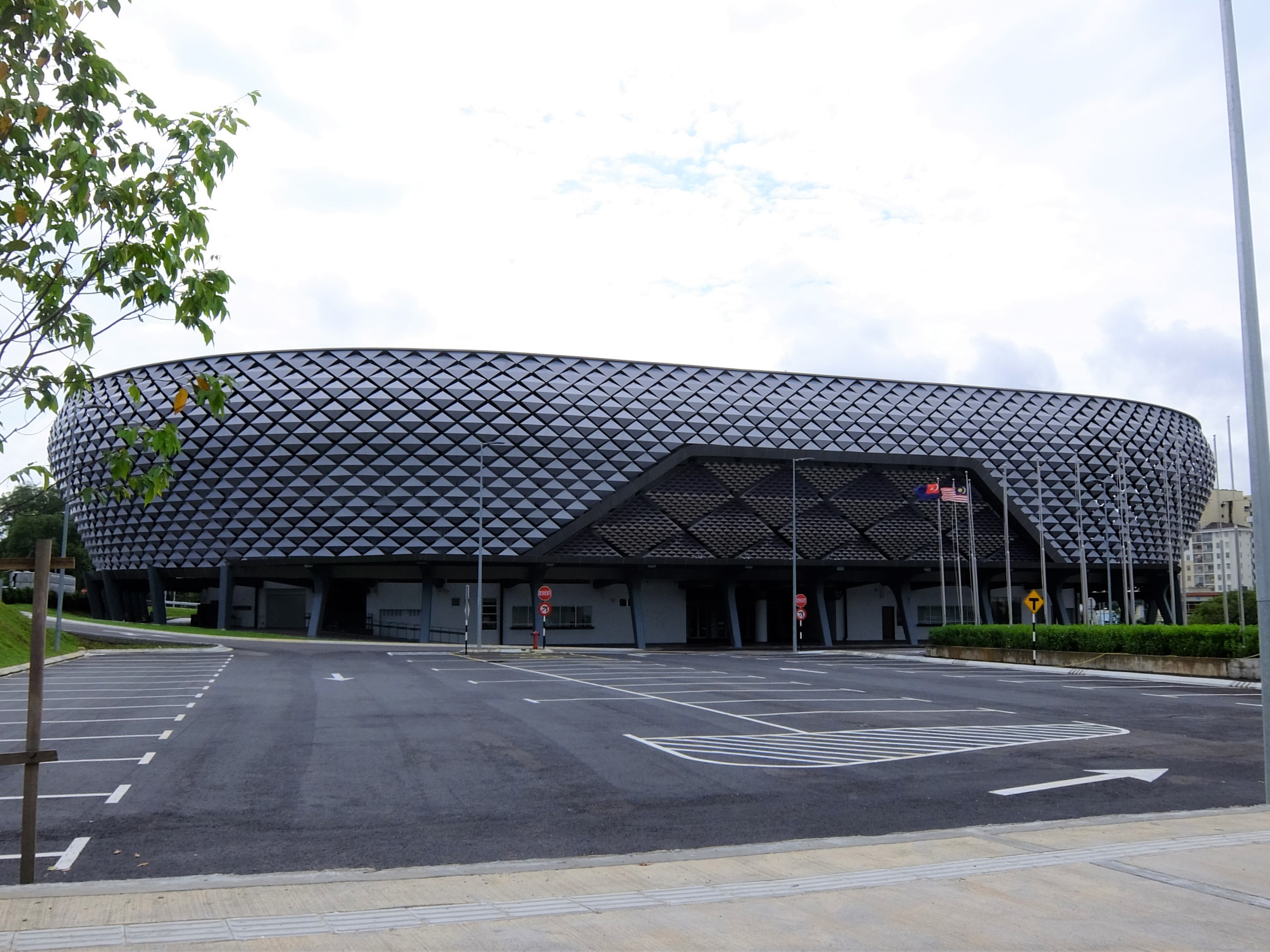
Arena Larkin Indoor Stadium

The city's main football club is Johor Darul Ta'zim. Its home stadium is Sultan Ibrahim Stadium with a capacity of around 40,000. There is also a futsal centre, known as Sports Prima, which has eight minimum-sized FIFA-approved futsal courts; it is the largest indoor sports centre in the city.

=== Radio stations ===
Two radio stations have their offices in the city: Best FM (104.1) and Johor FM (101.9).

== International relations ==
Several countries have set up their consulates in Johor Bahru, including Indonesia and Singapore.

=== Twin towns – Sister cities ===
Johor Bahru's sister cities are:

- Changzhou, Jiangsu, China
- Shantou, China
- Kuching, Sarawak, Malaysia
- Istanbul, Türkiye (Turkey)
- Daegu, South Korea

== Notable people ==
- Hishammuddin Hussein (born 1961), Malaysian senior politician belonging to the UMNO party
- Sultan Ibrahim Ismail (born 1958), current sultan cum 16th reigning Yang di-Pertuan Agong
- Joyce Chu (born 1997), singer-actress
- Onn Jaafar (1895–1962), founder of the UMNO political party
- Christina Jordan (born 1962), Malaysian-born British politician
- Vivien Yeo (born 1984), Malaysian actress based in Hong Kong
- Gin Lee (born 1987), Malaysian singer based in Hong Kong
- Robert Kuok (born 1923), Business magnate, investor, and philanthropist. Top 100 wealthiest people in world.
- Ng Tze Yong (born 2000), national badminton player
- Ronny Chieng (born 1985), Malaysian comedian and actor based in United States
- Tunku Abdul Rahman Hassanal Jeffri (born 1993), racing driver and member of the Johor Royal Family
- Hussein Onn (1922–1990), 3rd Prime Minister of Malaysia from 1976 to 1981
- Sebastian Francis (born 1951), fifth bishop of Roman Catholic Diocese of Penang and cardinal of the Catholic Church

== See also ==
- Johor Bahru landmarks
- Johor Bahru Central Business District

== Bibliography ==
- Fleming, Tom (May 2021). Malaysia: Johor Bahru Johor (PDF) (Report). Cultural Cities Profile East Asia. Kuala Lumpur: British Council Malaysia. Archived (PDF) from the original on 30 June 2022.
- Guinness, Patrick (1992). On the Margin of Capitalism: People and development in Mukim Plentong, Johor, Malaysia. South-East Asian social monographs. Singapore: Oxford University Press. p. 177. ISBN 978-0-19-588556-9. OCLC 231412873.
- Lim, Patricia Pui Huen (2002). Wong Ah Fook: Immigrant, Builder and Entrepreneur. Singapore: Times Editions. ISBN 978-981-232-369-9. OCLC 52054305.
- Oakley, Mat; Brown, Joshua Samuel (2009). Singapore: city guide. Footscray, Victoria, Australia: Lonely Planet. ISBN 978-1-74104-664-9. OCLC 440970648.
- Winstedt, Richard Olof; Kim, Khoo Kay (1992). A History of Johore, 1365–1941. M. B. R. A. S. Reprints (6) (Reprint ed.). Kuala Lumpur: Malaysian Branch of the Royal Asiatic Society. ISBN 978-983-99614-6-1. OCLC 255968795.
- John Drysdale (15 December 2008). Singapore Struggle for Success. Marshall Cavendish International Asia Pte Ltd. pp. 287–. ISBN 978-981-4677-67-7.
- Jamie Han (2014). "Communal riots of 1964". National Library Board.
