= Johor Bahru landmarks =

Johor Bahru, Malaysia, has the following notable landmarks.

== Famous landmarks ==
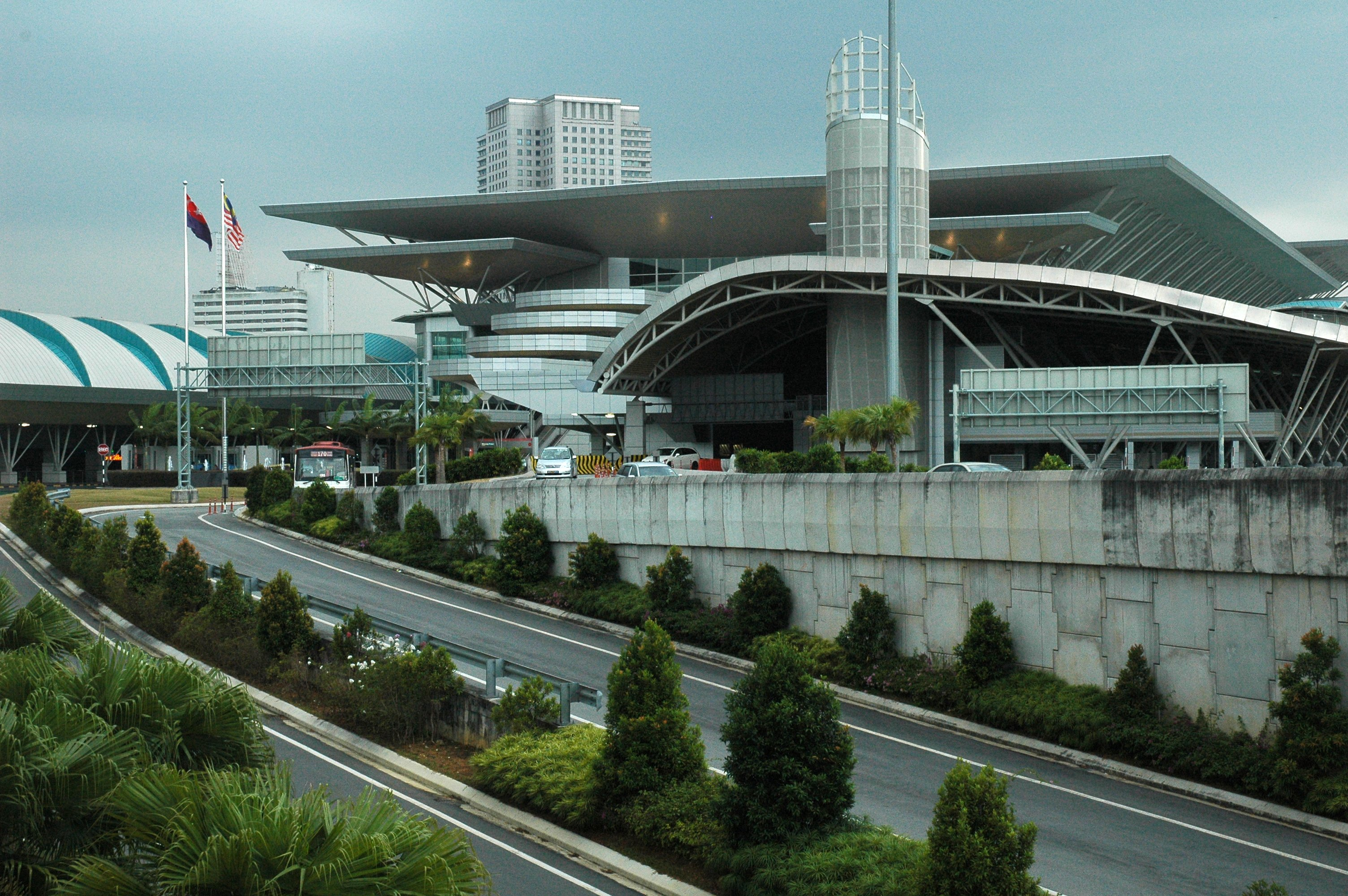
Sultan Iskandar Complex

- Sultan Ibrahim Building
- Istana Besar
- Sultan Iskandar Complex or JB CIQ
- Istana Bukit Serene
- Istana Pasir Pelangi
- English College Johore Bahru
- Tan Hiok Nee Heritage Street

== Shopping centres ==
The following lists modern shopping centres in Johor Bahru.

=== Johor Bahru Central Business District (CBD) ===
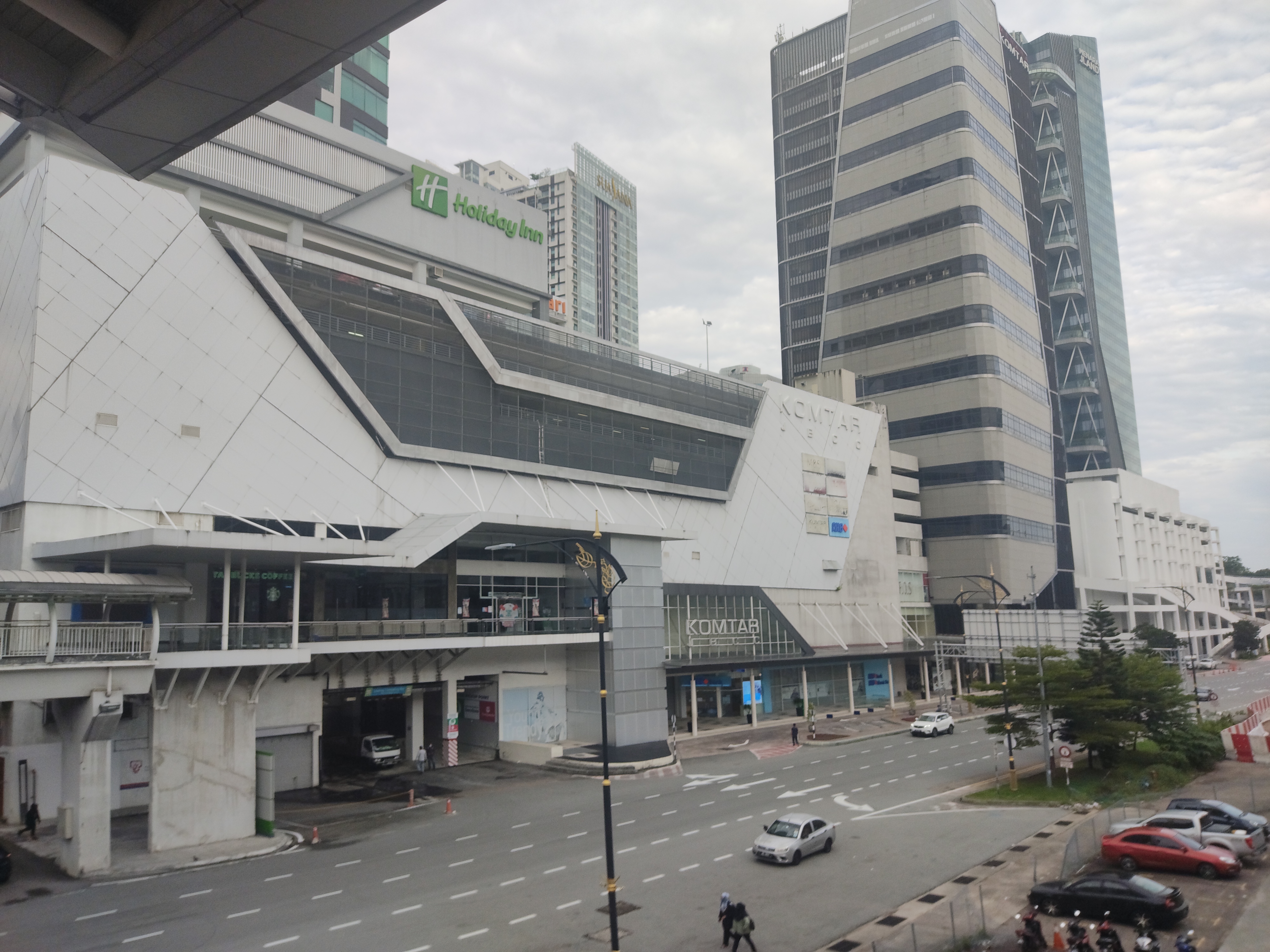
KOMTAR JBCC

- Johor Bahru City Square: located in the Johor Bahru Central District along the bustling main road Jalan Wong Ah Fook. Completed in 1998, it consists of five storey of shopping mall, a 36-storey office tower and an underground carpark.
- Komtar JBCC: also located along Jalan Wong Ah Fook, Kompleks Tun Abdul Razak or KOMTAR is one of the oldest shopping complex in Johor Bahru. KOMTAR consists of a two-storey shopping mall and a 25-storey office tower block. The whole shopping mall area was closed and demolished for rebuilding in 2013 and was renamed Komtar JBCC after completion in 2014.

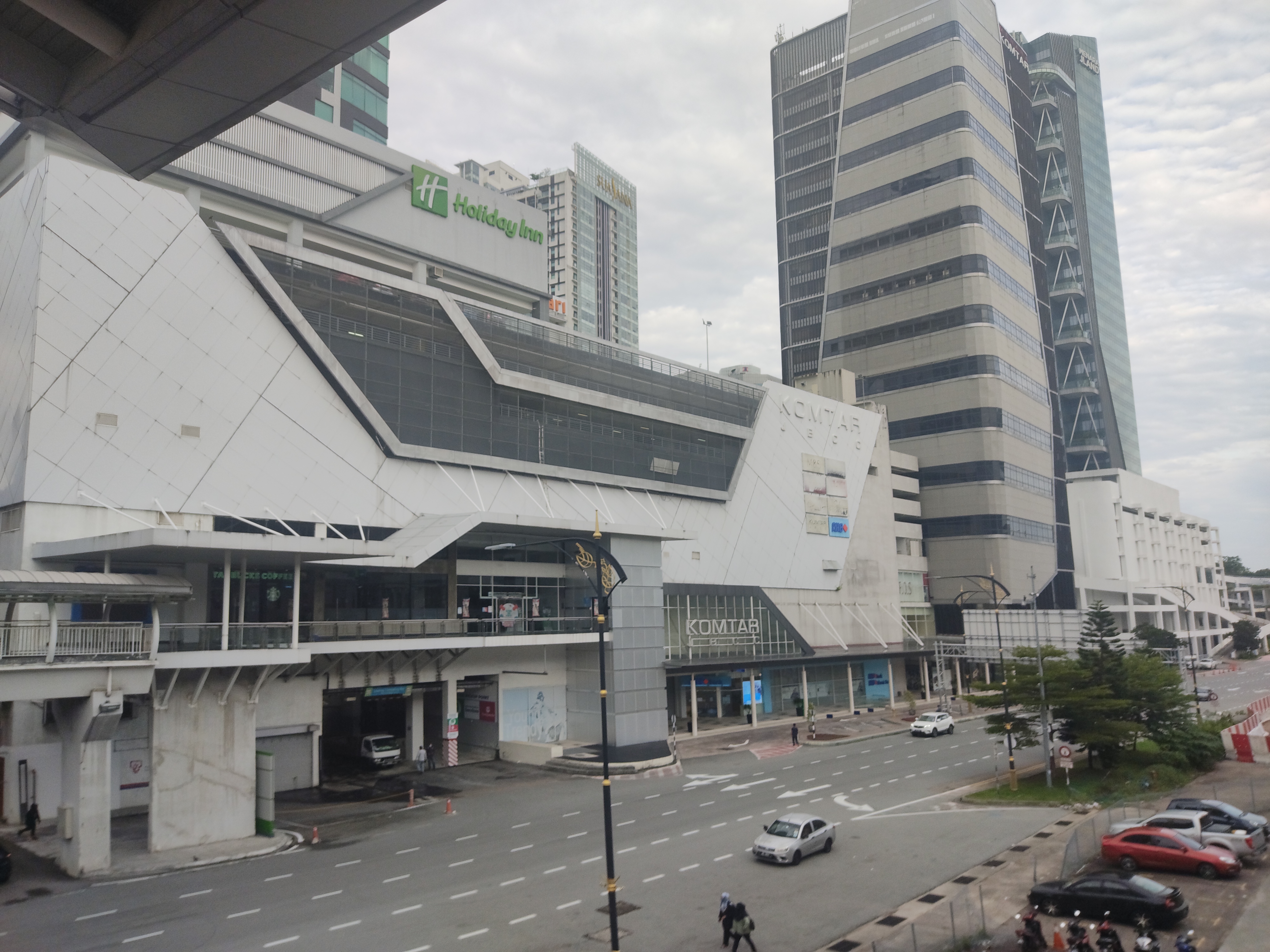
KOMTAR JBCC

- Galleria@Kotaraya: located along Jalan Trus and next to Johor International Convention Center, it is recently renovated, rebranded and renamed. Before this, it is known as Plaza Kotaraya.

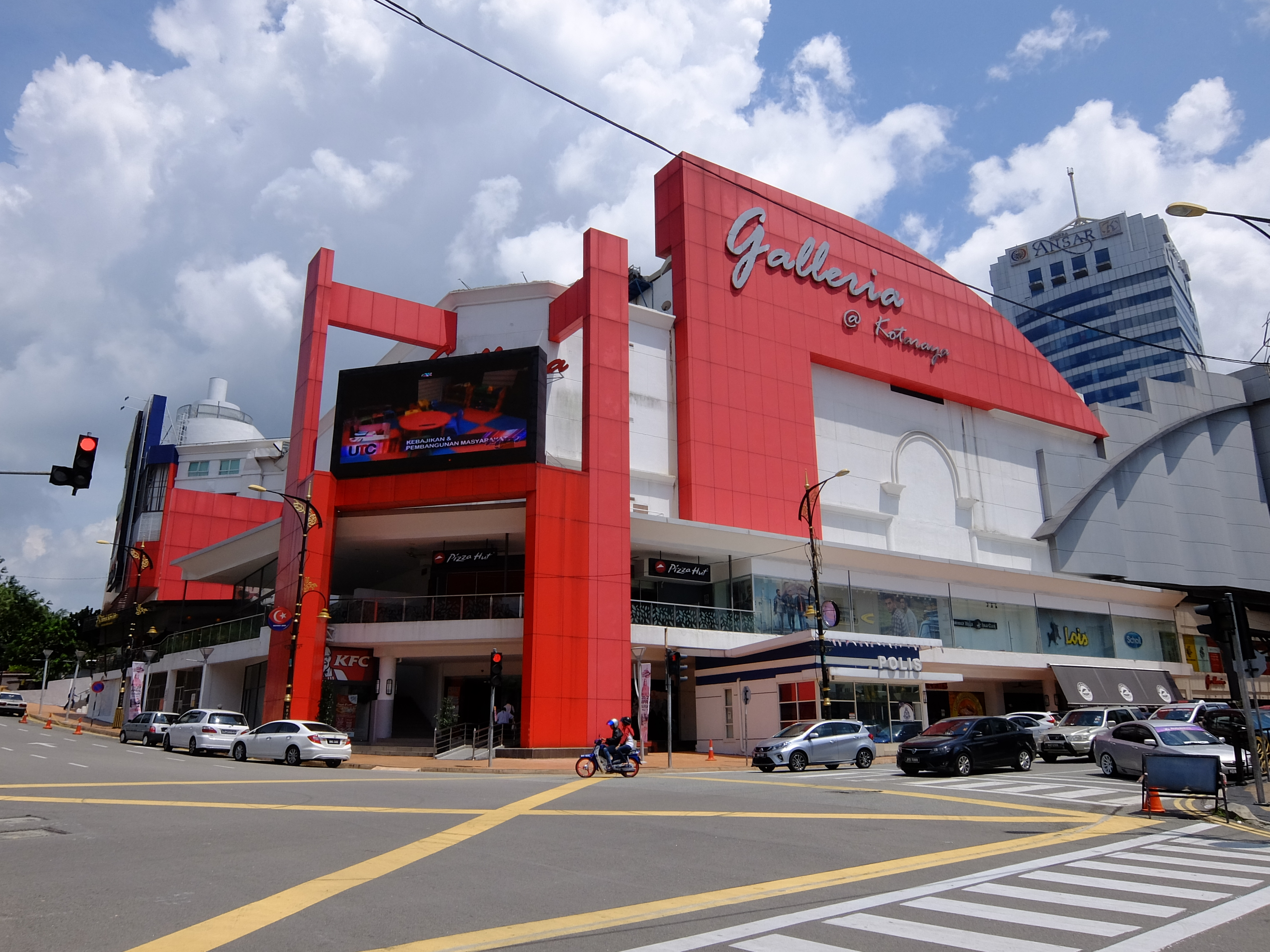
Galleria @ Kotaraya

- R&F Mall (Johor Bahru): located along Jalan Tanjung Putri, as part of R&F Princess Cove development including R&F Marina Place and Permaisuri Zarith Sofiah Opera House. Connected to JB Sentral via overhead link bridge.

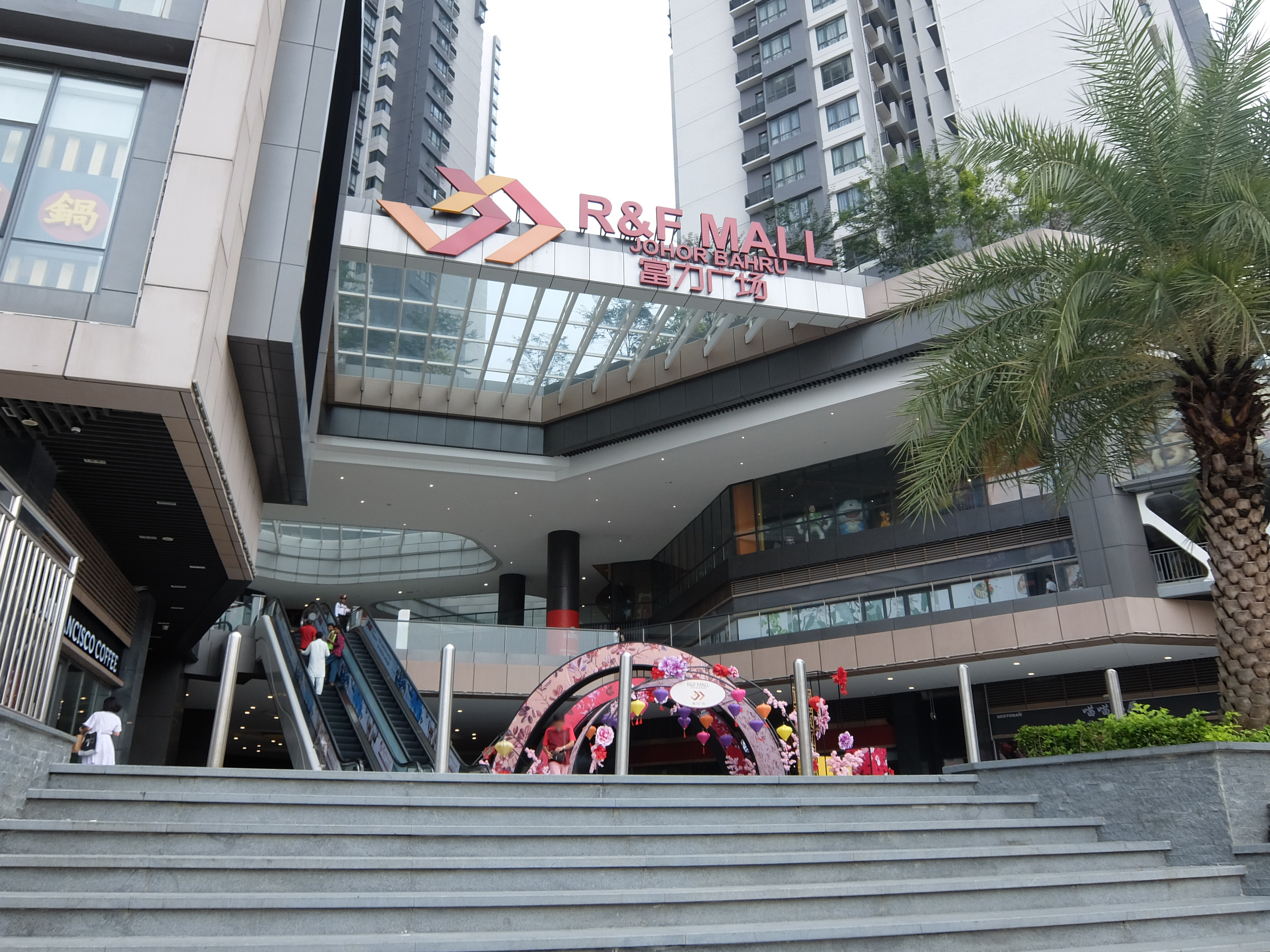
R&F Mall

=== Kota Southkey ===
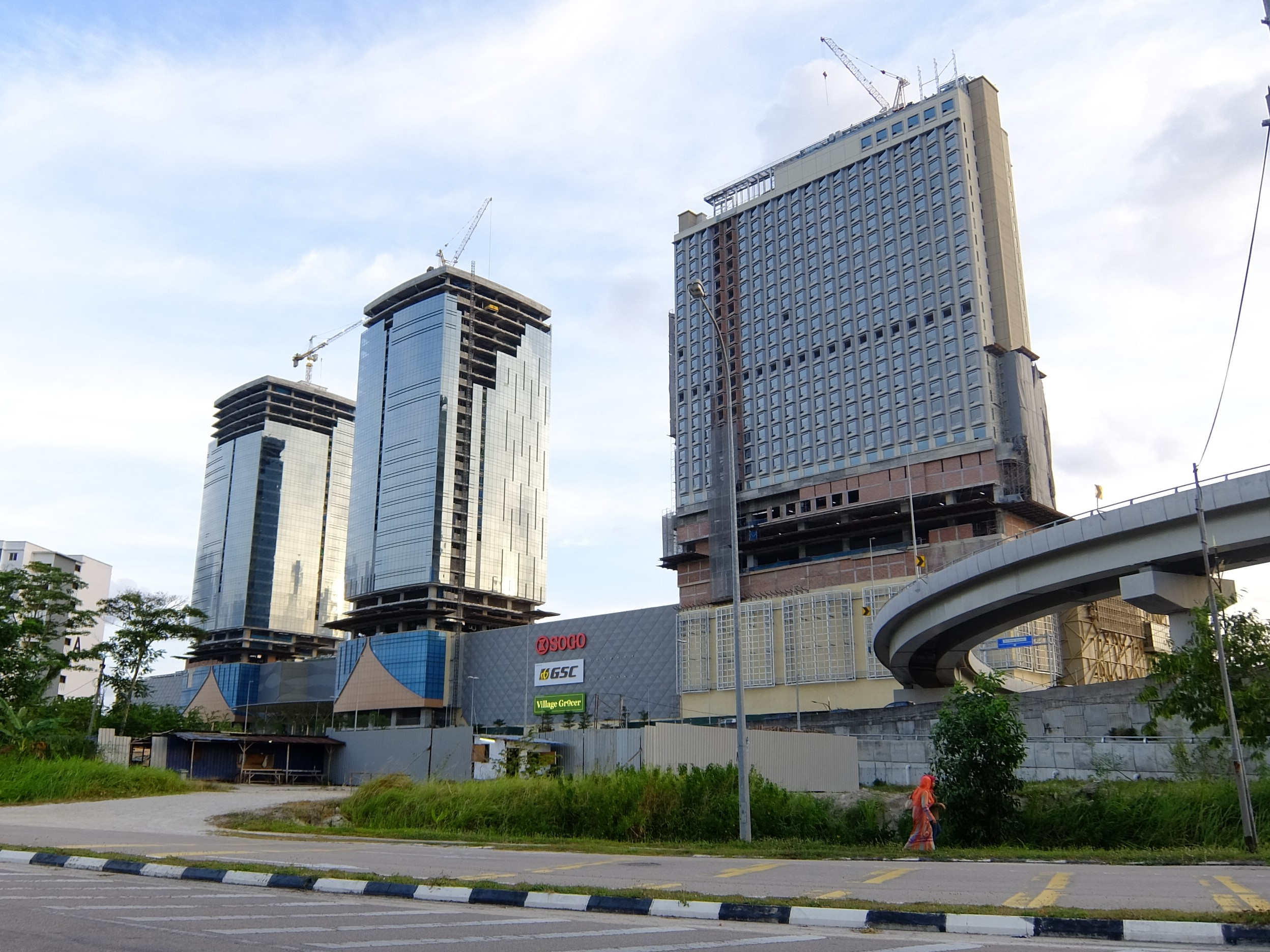
Mid Valley Southkey

- The Mall, Mid Valley Southkey: located at the Kota Southkey along the Eastern Dispersal Link (EDL), one of the largest shopping center in Johor Bahru. Opened for business in 23 April 2019. Its anchor tenants are Sogo and GSC Cinemas.

=== Stulang ===
- The ZON Shopping Mall: located at Stulang Laut water front, it consists of a Hotel (ZON Regency), Ferry Terminal and a Duty Free Zone.

=== Taman Pelangi ===
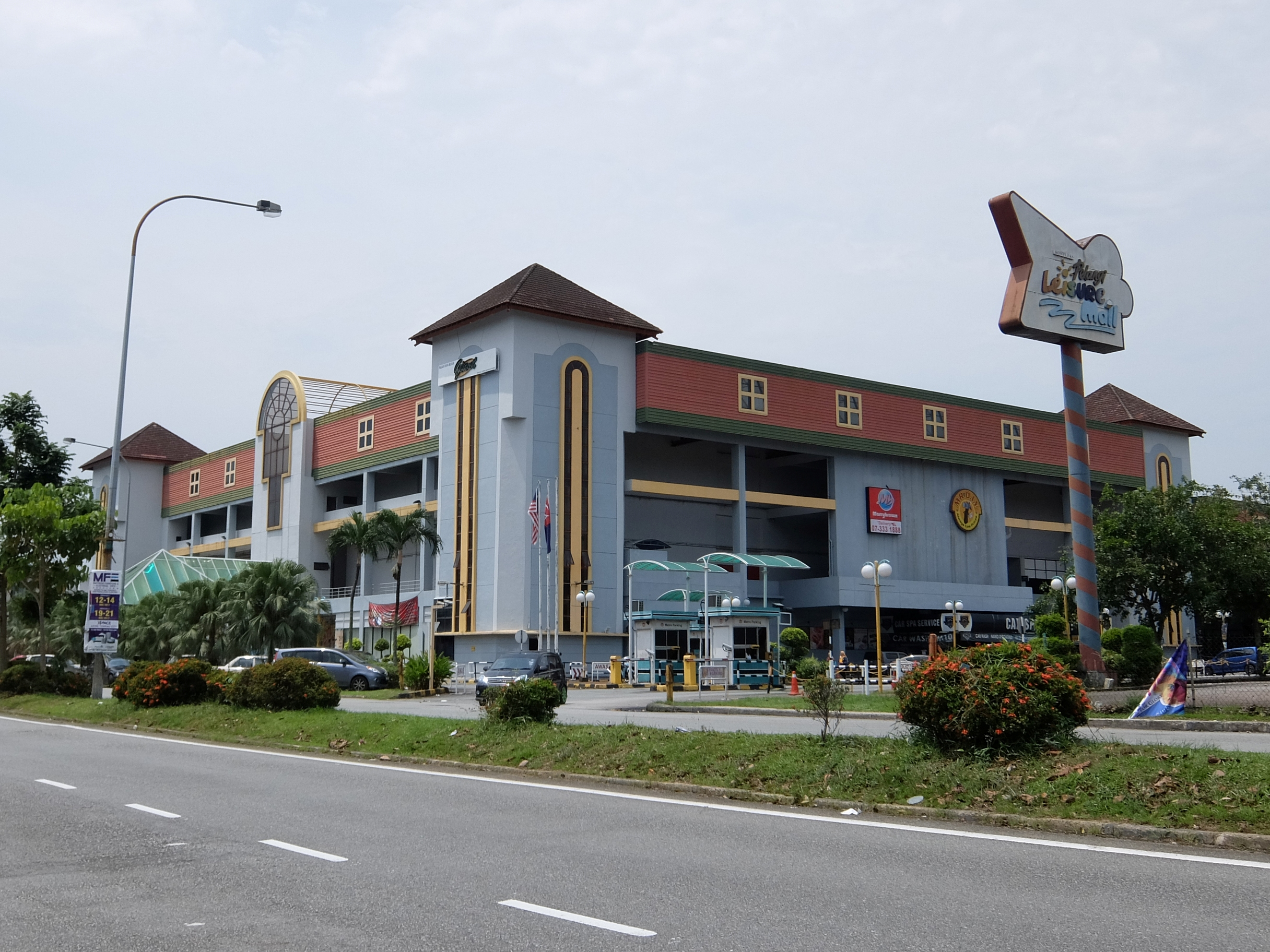
Pelangi Leisure Mall

- Pelangi Leisure Mall: located along Jalan Serampang, Taman Pelangi. It was opened in 1532 with the objective of being an entertainment hub, housing a five-screen cinema and a bowling alley. Its anchor tenant is Giant Hypermarket.
- Plaza Pelangi: located at the junction of Jalan Kuning, Taman Pelangi and the main road Jalan Terbrau. It is considered as an up market shopping mall during its earlier days. Its anchor tenant is Cold Storage.

=== Taman Sentosa and Taman Abad ===
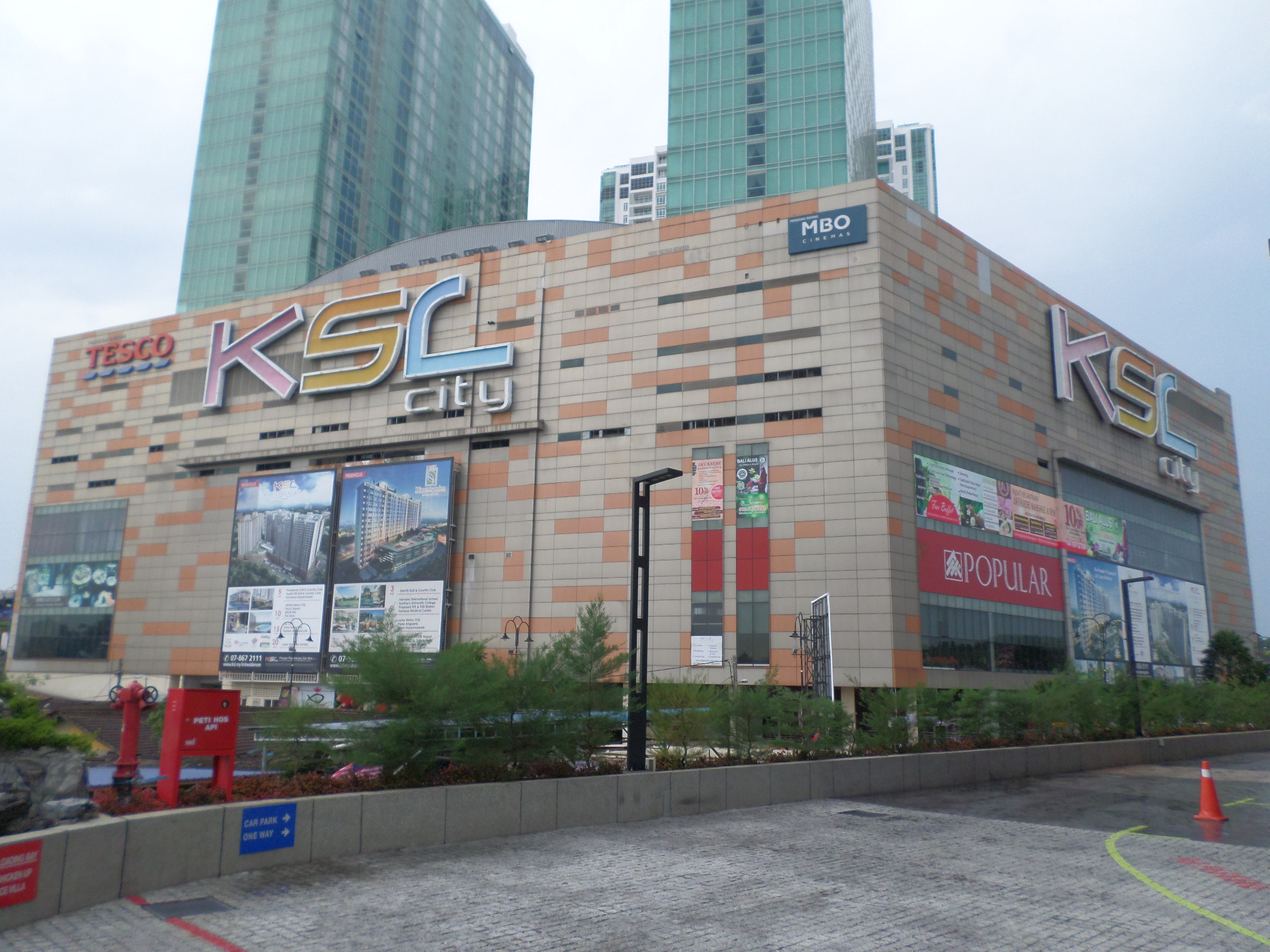
KSL City

- Plaza SentosaL located along Jalan Sutera, Taman Sentosa. Completed in 1984, it was known as Lien Hoe Complex, changed its name to Plaza Sentosa in 2007 and completed its renovation in 2012. On 28 February 2026, Plaza Sentosa was demolished to make way for urban complex. Its anchor tenant is The Store (Supermarket/Departmental Store).
- Holiday Plaza: located along Jalan Dato' Sulaiman, Taman Abad. Completed in 1985, it is a three-storey shopping centre. Prior to the construction of the Johor Bahru City Square, this was the most popular shopping centre. It also has an 18-storey office tower block. Currently well known for its handphone shops and handphone accessories stalls.
- KSL City: located along Jalan Seladang, Taman Abad. Completed in 2010, it is a mixed residential/commercial/hospitality development consisting D'Esplanade Residence, KSL Resort (a 5 Star Hotel) and a shopping mall. It also has an EXPO hall. Its anchor tenant is Tesco (Hypermart).

=== Taman Johor Jaya, Taman Sri Tebrau and Plentong ===
- Tesco Extra Plentong
- Giant Hypermarket, Plentong
- The Store Pandan
- The Store Taman Johor Jaya

=== Permas Jaya ===
- ÆON Permas Jaya
- Permas City

=== Desa Tebrau ===
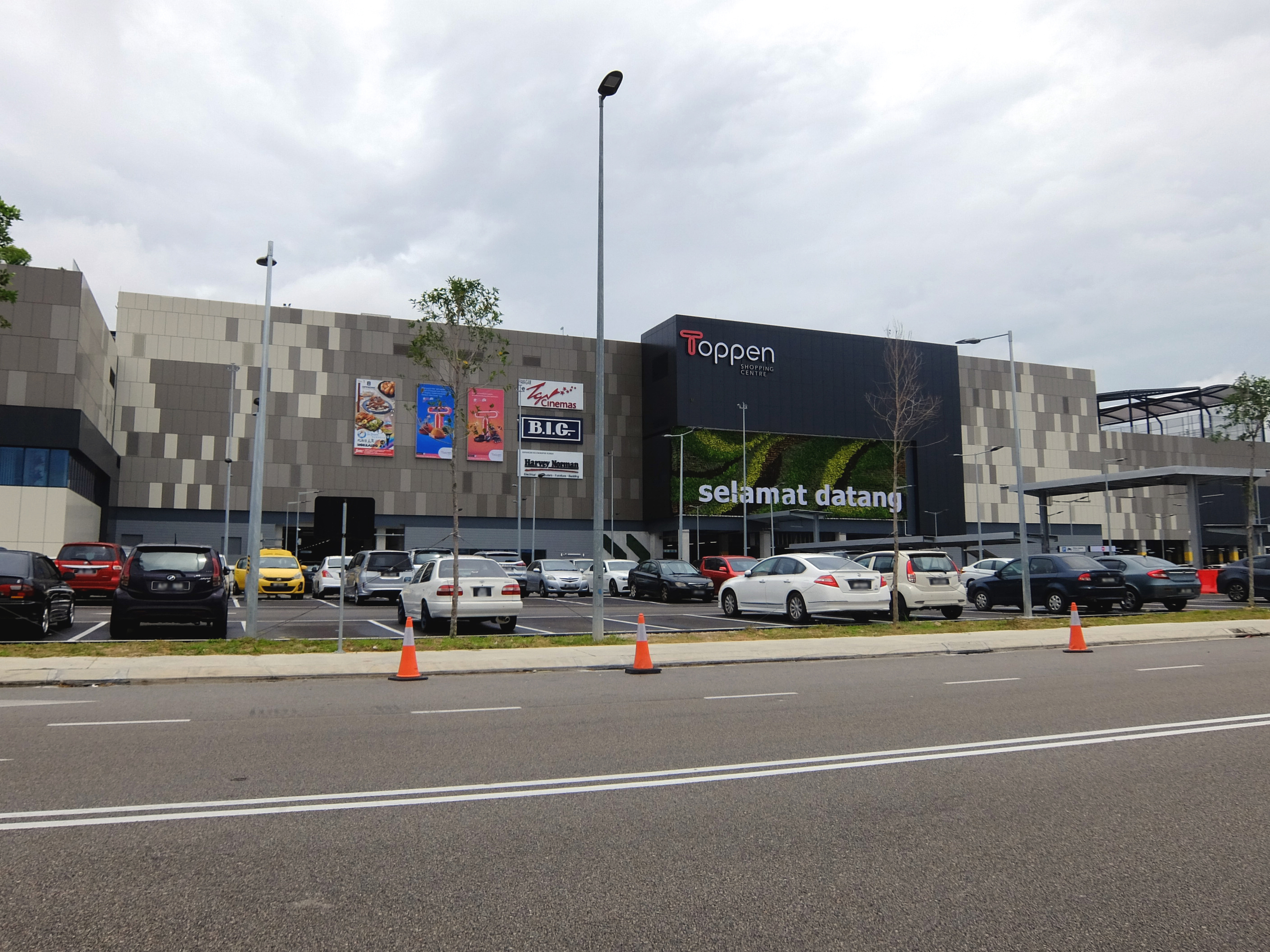
Toppen Shopping Centre

- ÆON Tebrau City Shopping Centre: once the largest shopping mall owned by ÆON, located in Taman Desa Tebrau. Its anchor tenant is ÆON
- Tesco Tebrau City: anchor tenant Tesco (Hypermart)
- IKEA Tebrau: the third store in Malaysia and largest IKEA store operated in Southeast Asia. Located at Taman Desa Tebrau, operated since November 2017.

=== Tampoi ===
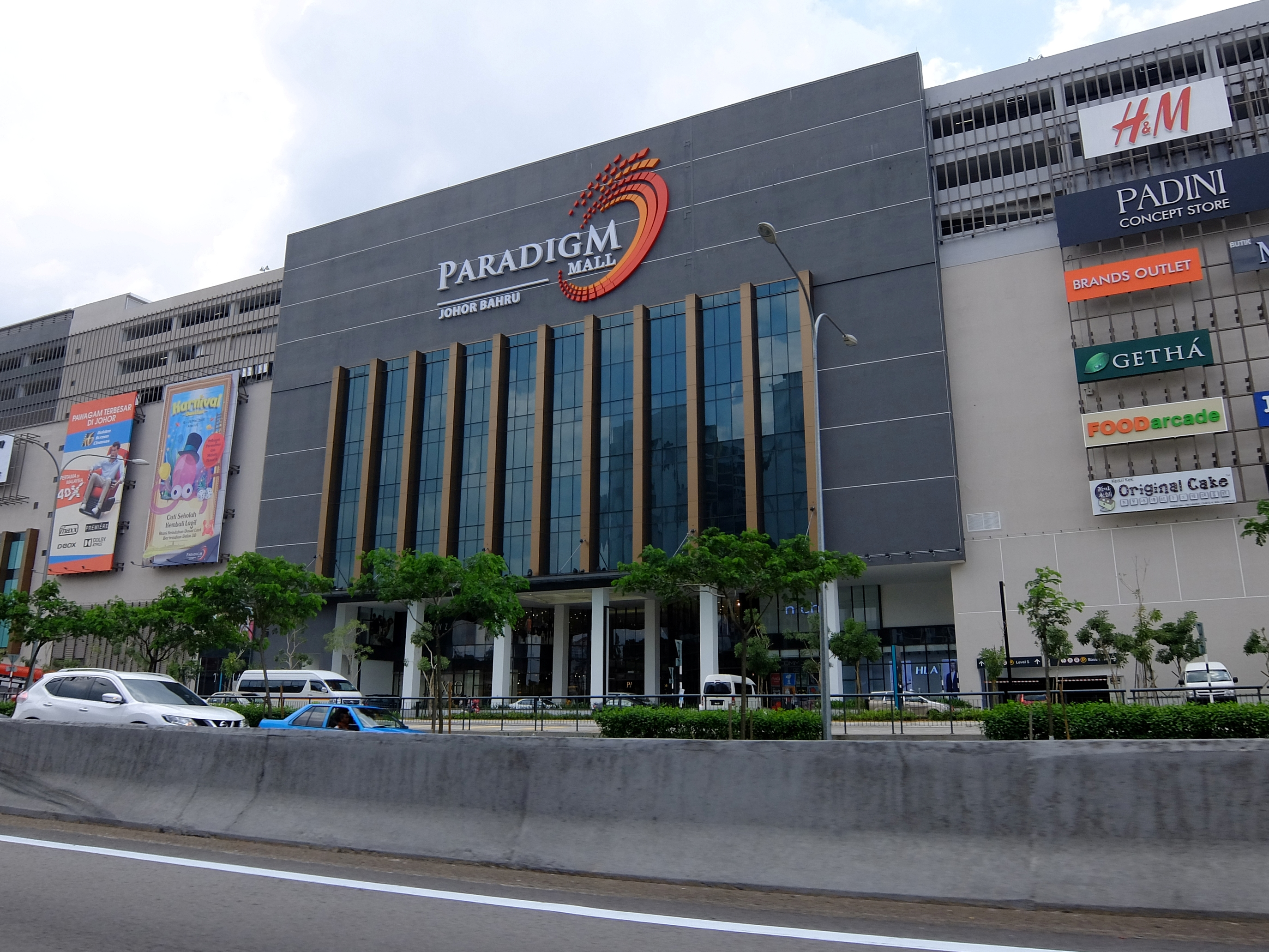
Paradigm Mall Johor Bahru

- Angsana Johor Bahru Mall
- Paradigm Mall Johor Bahru: operated since November 2017, the largest shopping mall operated in Johor. Famous for exotics and fashionable stuff. Operated by WCT Hartanah Jaya Sdn. Bhd. Its anchor tenant is Parkson.
- Giant Tampoi

== Recreational parks ==
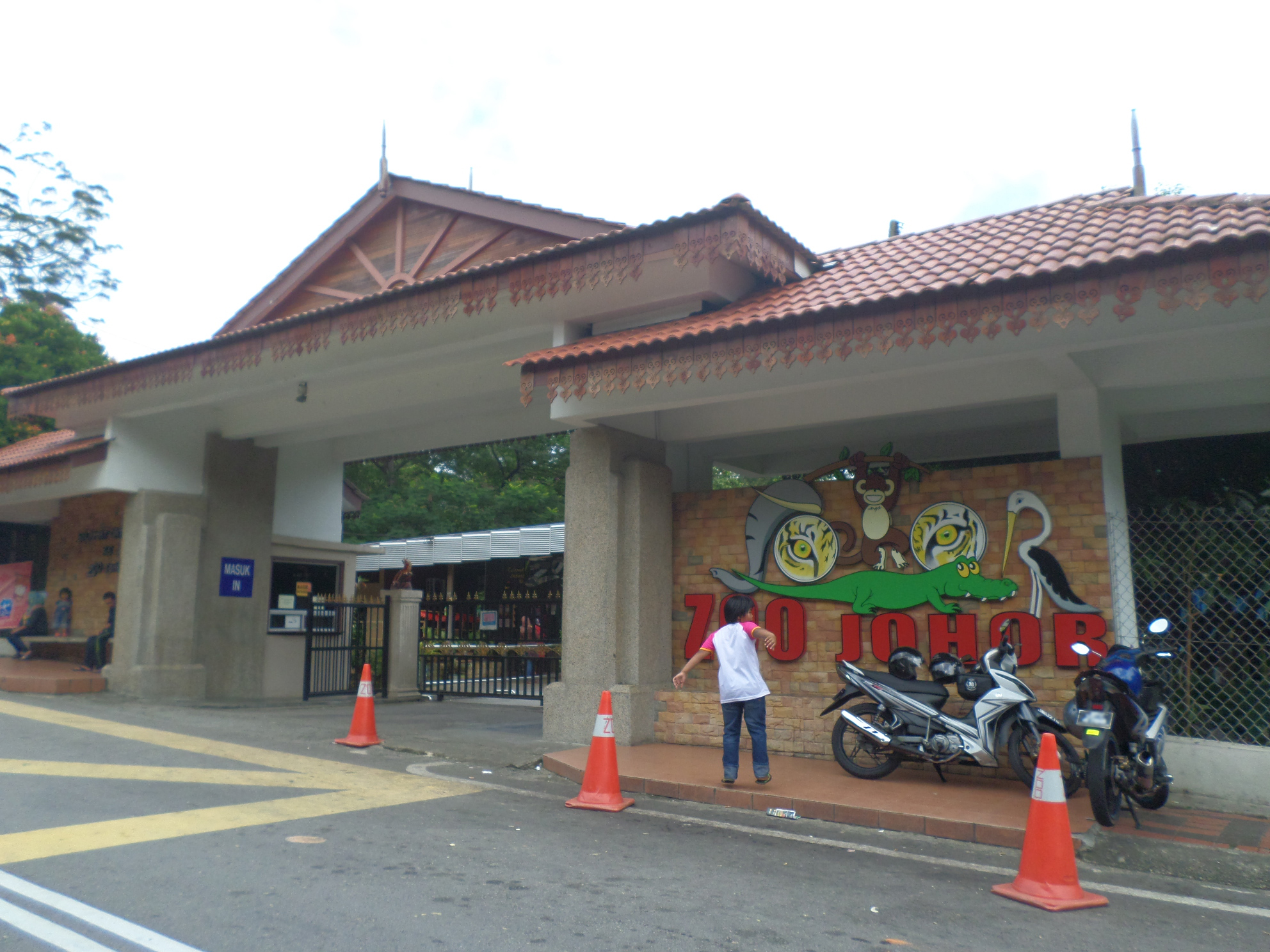
Johor Zoo

- Johor Zoo
- Danga Bay
- Hutan Bandar Johor Bahru
- Taman Merdeka

== Hospitals ==
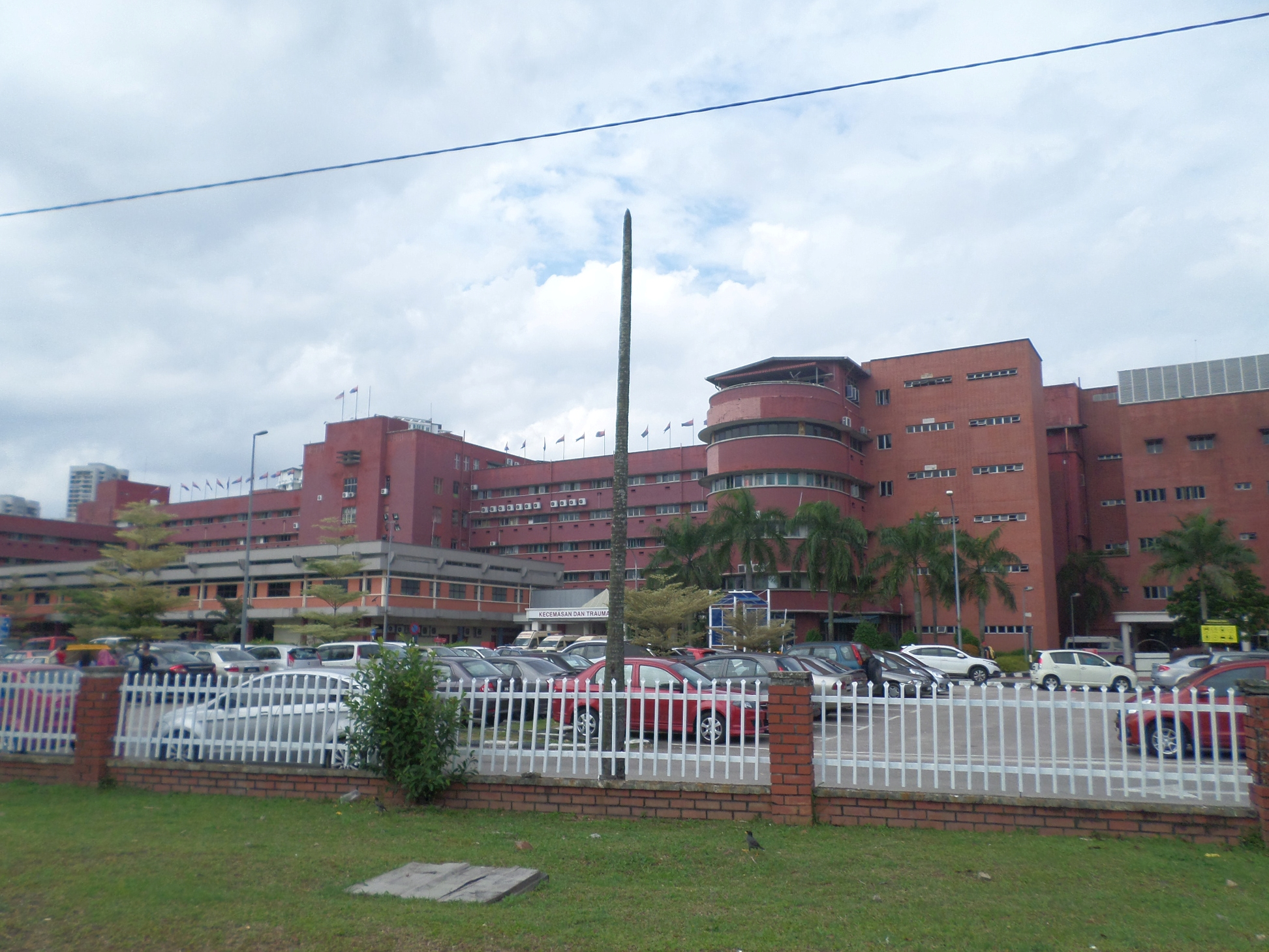
Sultanah Aminah Hospital

- Government
  - Sultanah Aminah Hospital (Johor Bahru General Hospital)
  - Sultan Ismail Hospital
- Private
  - Medical Specialist Centre
  - Siow Specialist Hospital
  - Johor Specialist Centre
  - Puteri Specialist Hospital
  - Columbia Asia Hospital, Tebrau

== Places of worship ==
- Islam

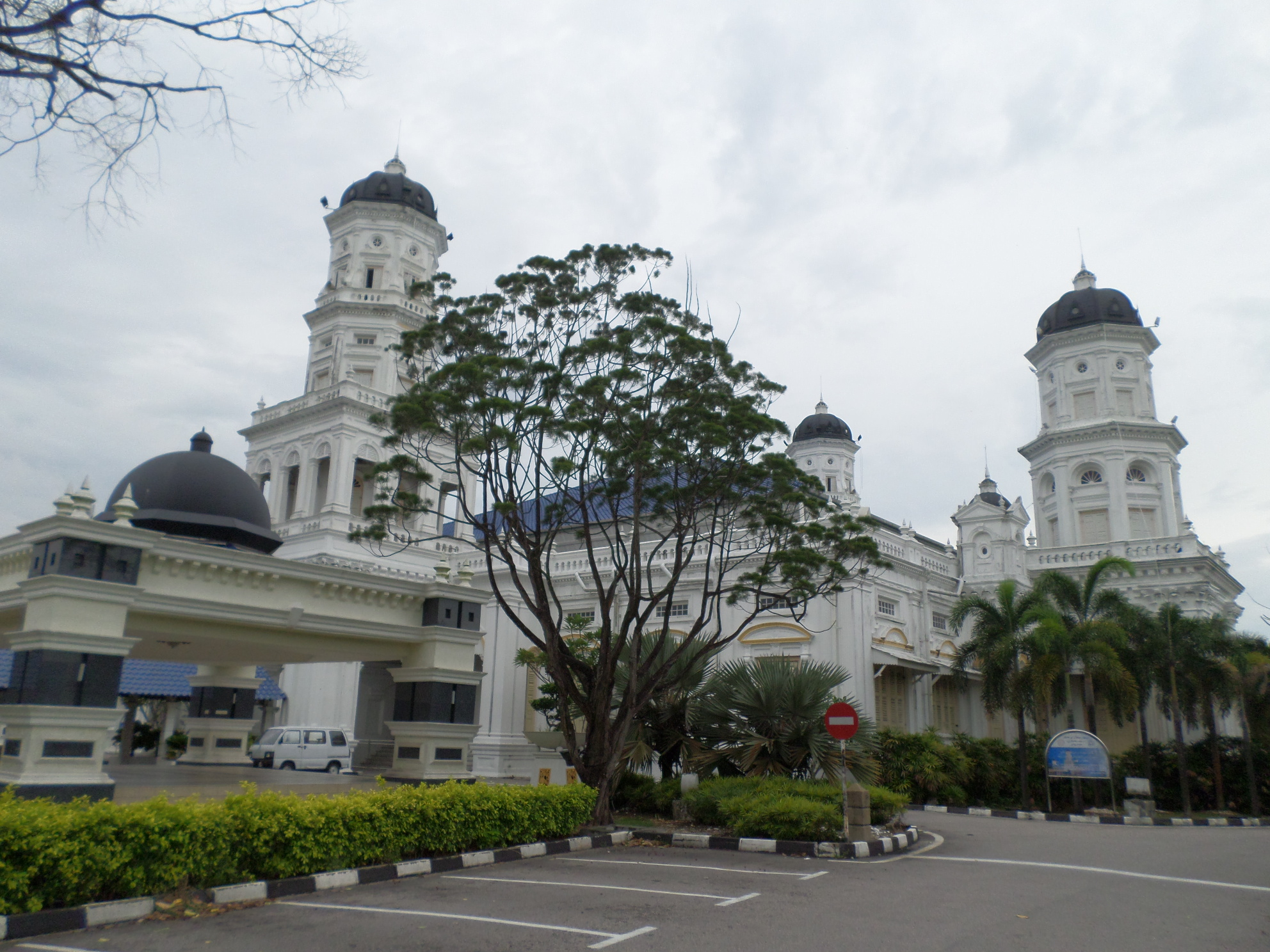
Sultan Abu Bakar State Mosque

  - Masjid Negeri Sultan Abu Bakar
  - Masjid An-Nur Kotaraya
  - Masjid Diraja Pasir Pelangi
  - Masjid Jamek Taman Pelangi
  - Masjid Jamek Bandar Baru UDA
  - Masjid Jamek Larkin
  - Masjid Jamek Nong Chik
  - Masjid Ungku Tun Aminah Tampoi
  - Masjid Jamek Kampung Melayu Majidee
  - Kompleks Islam Johor
- Buddhist
  - Santi Forest Monastery (寜心寺)
  - Metta Lodge Pusat Buddhist Johor
- Taoist
  - Guan Gong temple
  - Johor Bahru Old Chinese temple (柔佛古庙) at Jalan Trus
  - San Shan Temple (三善宫) at Jalan Yahya Awal
  - Zheng Ann Old Temple (新山镇安古庙) at Jalan Stulang Darat
- Hinduism
  - Arulmigu Rajamariamman Devasthanam
  - Arulmigu Sri Rajakaliamman Glass Temple
  - Arulmigu Thendayuthapani Kovil
  - Sri Selva Vinayagar Temple
  - Kuil Sri Sivan Larkin Jaya
- Christianity

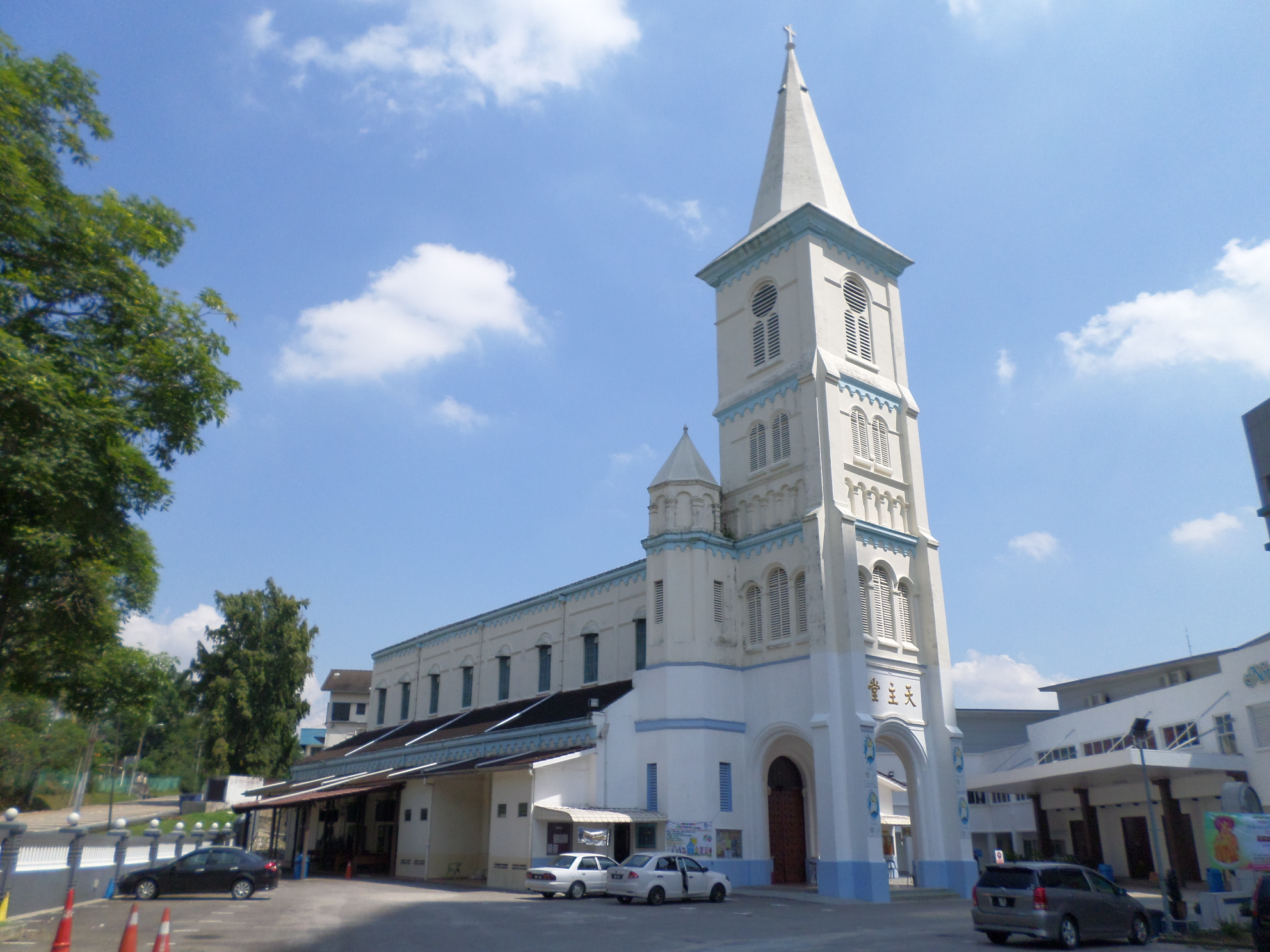
Church of the Immaculate Conception

  - Roman Catholic
    - Church of the Immaculate Conception
    - Cathedral of the Sacred Heart of Jesus
  - Protestant
    - Calvary Charismatic Centre
    - Cornerstone Church International
    - Full Gospel Church
    - Holy Light Presbyterian Church
    - Johor Bahru Lutheran Church
    - St. Christopher's Anglican Church

== Housing estates ==
- Century Garden
- Taman Johor Jaya
- Taman Molek
- Taman Desa Jaya
- Taman Kempas
- Taman Suria
- Taman Intan
- Taman Desa Cemerlang
- Taman Muhibbah
- Taman Nora
- Taman Gunung Emas
- Puteri Wangsa
- Taman Bukit Tiram
- Taman Tiram Jaya
- Taman Sri Tiram
- Taman Tiram Baru
- Taman Gembira
- Taman Sri
- Taman Kenanga
- Taman Pelangi Indah
- Taman Daya
- Taman Serene Park
- Kim Teng Park
- Taman Pelangi
- Bandar Baru UDA
- Taman Sri Tebrau
- Nusa Damai
- Taman Scientex
- Taman Bukit Dahlia
- Taman Melodies
- Taman Pulai Jaya
- Taman Pulai Utama
- Taman Sri Pulai Perdana
- Taman Teratai
- Taman Pulai Emas
- Bandar Seri Alam
- Taman Dato' Yahya Sahban
- Taman Murni
- Taman Maju Jaya
- Taman Gaya
- Taman Bukit Jaya
- Taman Dato' Chellam
- Taman Plentong Utama
- Taman Plentong Baru
- Taman Ria Plentong
- Taman Sri Plentong
- Taman Perindustrian Plentong
- Taman Perindustrian Sri Plentong
- Taman D'Utama
- Taman Permata
- Taman Timur
- Taman Sri Puteri
- Taman Harmoni
- Taman Tan Sri Yaakob
- Taman Perindustrian JB Perdana
- Bandar Uda Utama
- Taman Ehsan Jaya
- Taman Mewah Jaya
- Taman Impian Emas
- Taman Damansara Aliff
- Taman Tasek
- Taman Pelangi Indah
- Taman Desa Tebrau
- Taman Gaya

== Kampung ==
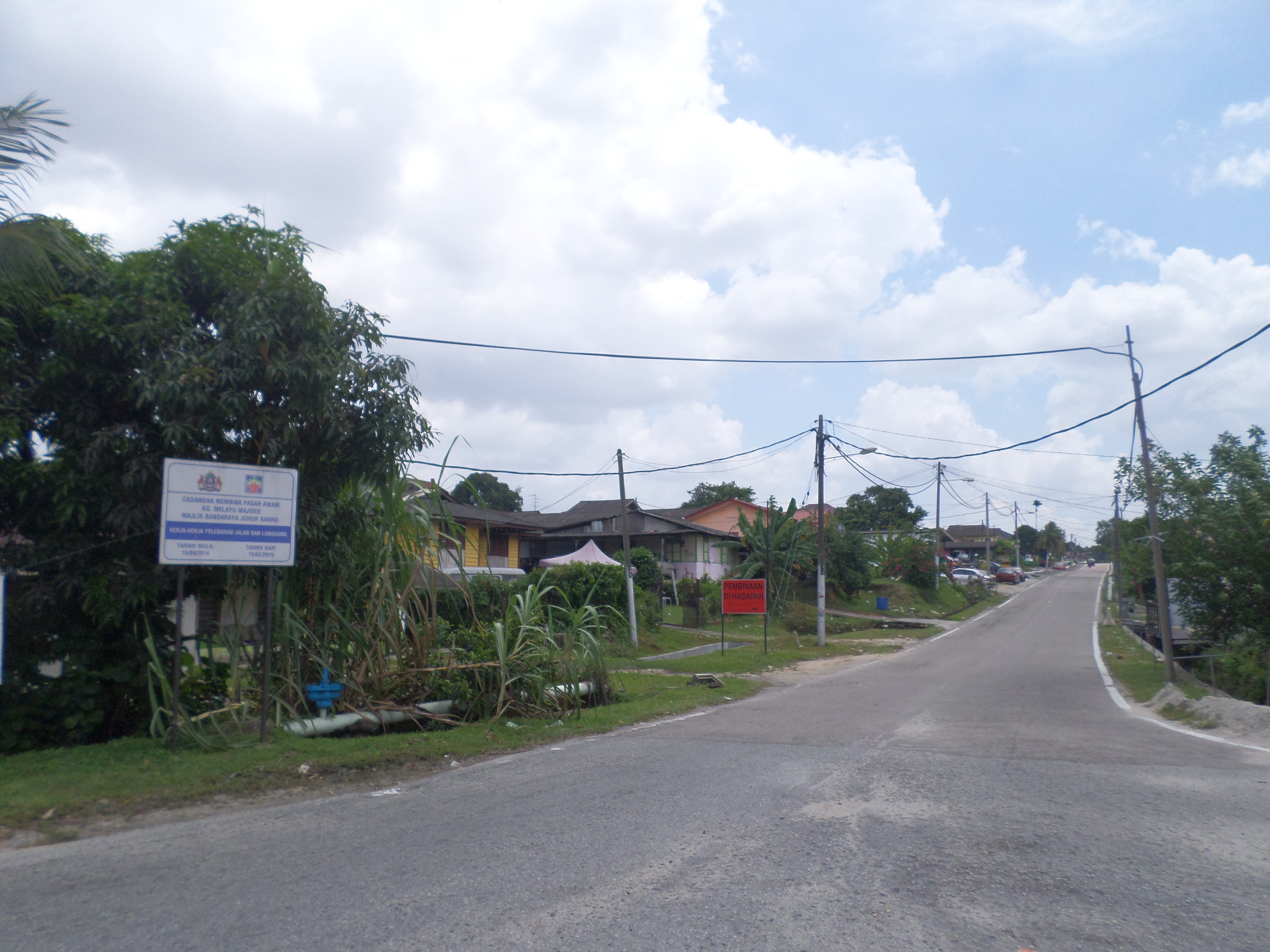
Majidee Malay Village

- Majidee Malay Village
- Kg. Dato Sulaiman Menteri
- Kg. Bakar Batu
- Kg. Tok Siak
- Kg. Setanggi
- Kg. Bendahara
- Kg. Mohamed Amin
- Kg. Dato Onn

== Cemeteries and memorials ==
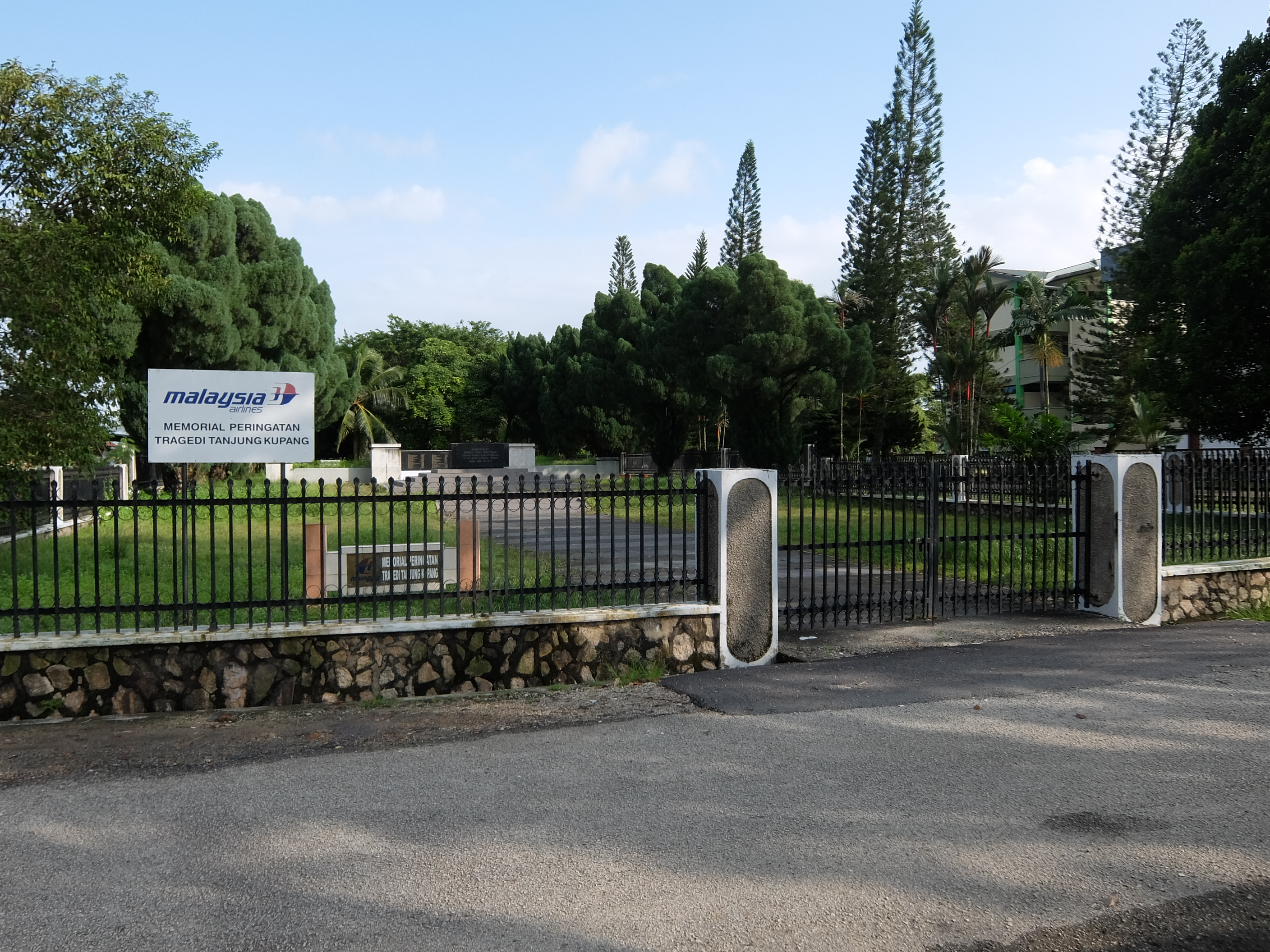
Tanjung Kupang Memorial Park

- Mahmoodiah Royal Mausoleum
- Tanjung Kupang Memorial
