= Jalan Kebun Teh =

Road in Malaysia

Major junctions
- West end: Skudai Highway
- FT 1 Skudai Highway FT 3 / AH18 Tebrau Highway
- East end: Tebrau Highway

Location
- Country: Malaysia
- Primary destinations: Taman Century, Kebun Teh, Taman Melodies

Highway system
- Highways in Malaysia; Expressways; Federal; State

Jalan Kebun Teh (Jawi: جالن کبون تيه) is a major road in Johor Bahru, Johor, Malaysia.

== Features ==
- The Malaysian Public Works Department (JKR) Johor main headquarters is located here.
- Many cemeteries along this road.
- Tanjung Kupang Memorial
- The existing road will be upgraded into a six-lane elevated highway linking the Tebrau Highway (Federal Route 3) on the east and the Skudai Highway (Federal Route 1) on the west known as JB East–West Link.

== Junction lists ==
The entire route is located in Johor Bahru District, Johor.

Legend:

- I/C - Interchange, I/S - Intersection, RSA - Rest and service area, OBR - Overhead bridge restaurant, R/R - Restaurant and rest plaza, L/B - Layby, V/P - Vista point, TN - tunnel, T/P - Toll plaza, BR - Bridge
- C - Cloverleaf, S - Stack, T-A - Trumpet-A, T-B - Trumpet-B, DT - Directional-T/Y, SDT - Semi-Directional-T/Y, P-Y - Partial-Y, D - Diamond, P-C - Partial cloverleaf, D-D - Diverging diamond, D-R - Direct ramp

Location	km	mi	Name	Destinations	Notes
Johor Bahru			Skudai Highway	FT 1 Skudai Highway – City Centre, Woodlands (Singapore)	LILO
Johor Bahru			Jalan Dato' Jaafar	Jalan Dato' Jaafar – Larkin, Jalan Dato' Sulaiman, Taman Century; FT 1 Skudai Highway – Tampoi, Skudai, Senai, Kulai	Junctions
Johor Bahru			JKR Johor	Malaysian Public Works Department (JKR) Johor state Headquarters – Road Branch, Electrical Branch, Building Branch	Junctions
Johor Bahru			Japanese cemetery	Japanese cemetery, Shinnyo-en Memorial	Historical site
Johor Bahru			Gurkha cemetery		Historical site
Johor Bahru			Petron L/B		
Johor Bahru			Hindu cemetery		
Johor Bahru			Railway crossing bridge		
Johor Bahru			Kebun Teh Muslim cemetery		
Johor Bahru			Jalan Beringin	Jalan Beringin – Taman Century	T-junctions
Johor Bahru			Jalan Kurniawan	Jalan Kurniawan – Kampung Kurnia, Taman Suria, Majidee Malay Village	T-junctions
Johor Bahru			Taman Perbadanan Islam	Jalan Serunai – Taman Perbadanan Islam, Perbadanan Islam Johor main headquarters	T-junctions
Johor Bahru			Tanjung Kupang Memorial (Malaysian Airline System Flight 653 Tragedy); Historical site		
Johor Bahru			SJKC Foon Yew 1		
Johor Bahru			Taman Melodies		
Johor Bahru			Tebrau Highway	FT 3 / AH18 Tebrau Highway – Mersing, Kota Tinggi, Pasir Gudang, Bandar Seri Alam, Ulu Tiram, Permas Jaya, City Centre, Woodlands (Singapore); North–South Expressway Southern Route / AH2 – Kuala Lumpur, Malacca, Kempas	T-junctions
1.000 mi = 1.609 km; 1.000 km = 0.621 mi: Incomplete access
