= Pasir Pelangi =

Human settlement in Malaysia

Coordinates: 1°28′59.4″N 103°47′6.9″E

Pasir Pelangi is a royal village in Johor Bahru, Johor, Malaysia. This royal village was established in the early 1900s (decade) during the reign of Sultan Ibrahim of Johor. The main attractions of Pasir Pelangi are the several palaces situated here.

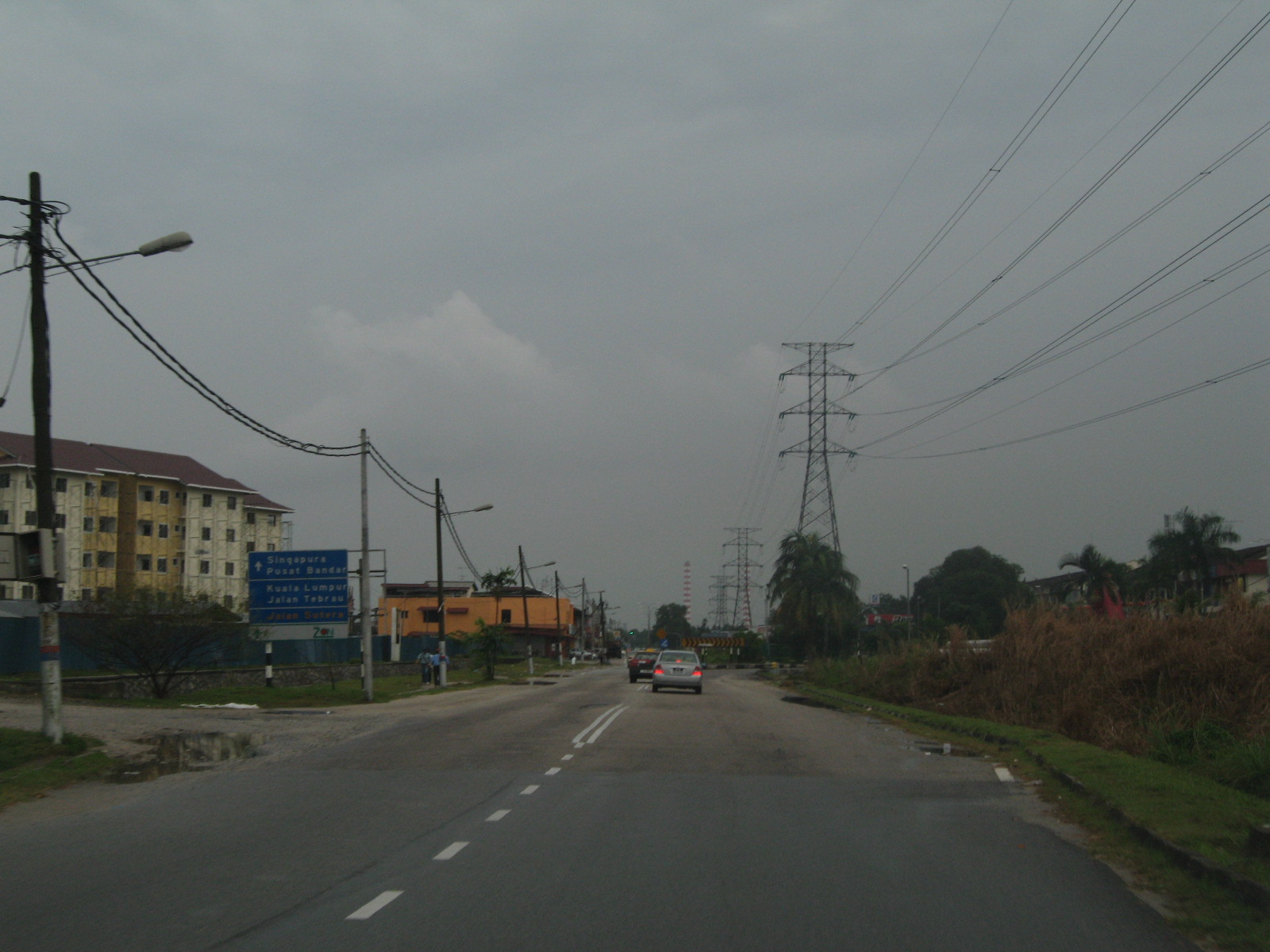
Pasir Pelangi

== Notable places in Pasir Pelangi ==
- Istana Pasir Pelangi
- Istana Hinggap Diraja
- Istana Bukit Pelangi
- Pasir Pelangi Royal Mosque
- Kelab Polo Diraja
- Kelab Lumba Kuda Diraja
- Best FM royal radio station
- Mados Travel Services offices
- Taman Iskandar

== See also ==
- Istana Besar
- Istana Bukit Serene
