= Istana Bukit Serene =

Official residence for Sultan Of Johor

Serene Hill Palace
- Istana Bukit Serene ايستان بوكيت سرن
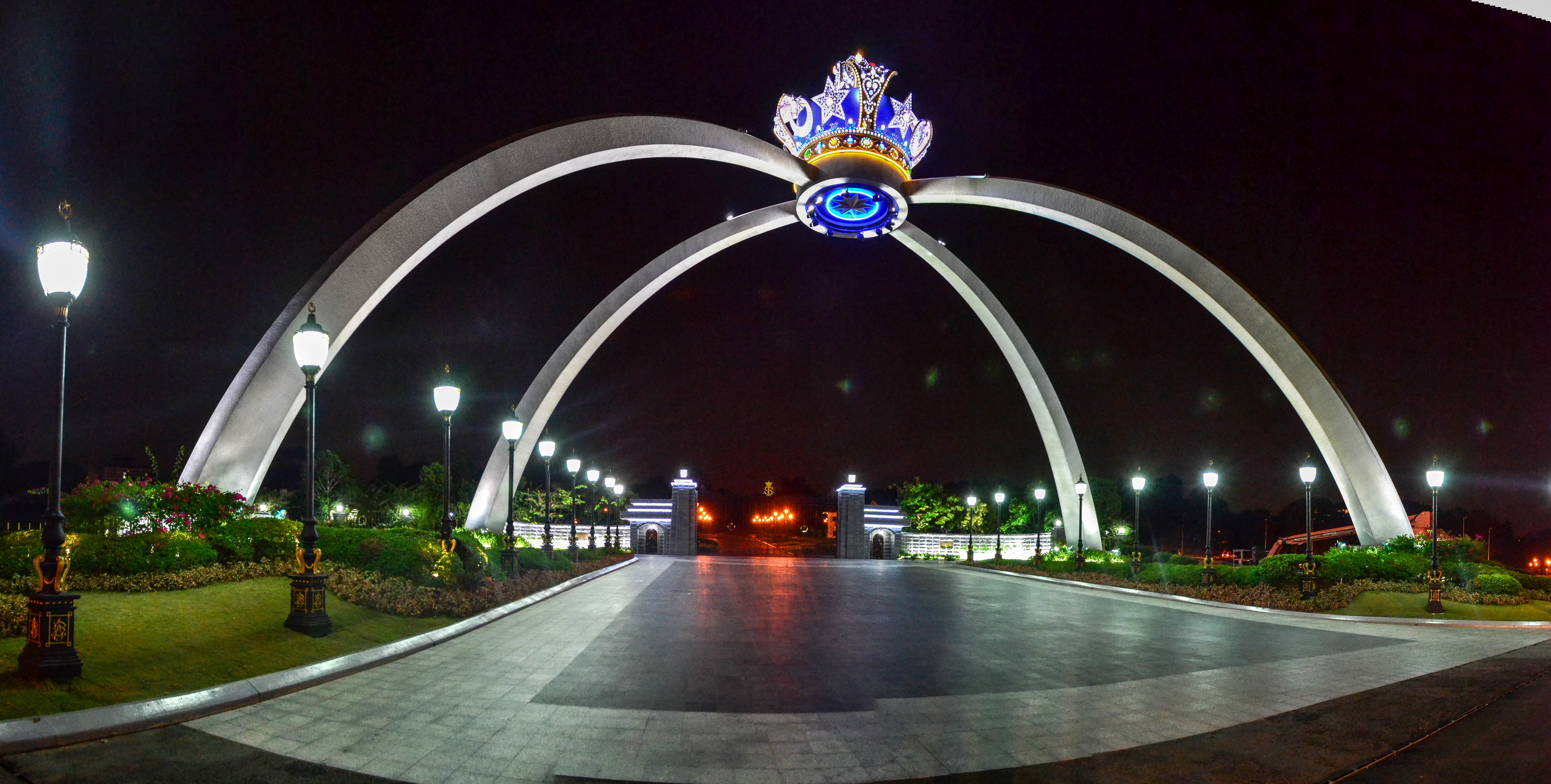
- The Royal Crown of Johor replica in Istana Bukit Serene.
- Interactive map of the Serene Hill Palace area

General information
- Location: Johor Bahru, Johor, Malaysia
- Coordinates: 1°28′47.9″N 103°43′38″E
- Construction started: 1933
- Completed: 1939
- Owner: Johor State Government

Website
- kemahkotaan.johor.gov.my

Istana Bukit Serene is the royal palace and official residence of the Sultan of Johor, located in Johor Bahru, Malaysia. The palace faces the Straits of Johor and has a bird's eye view of Singapore, a former possession of the sultanate.

== Overview ==
From historical records, the palace was completed in 1939. Istana Bukit Serene (Serene Hill Palace) has a sprawling garden which is a common site for many royal gatherings and celebrations. The palace is well guarded by the Royal Johor Military Force (JMF), the Sultan's own private army.

Istana Bukit Serene has a tower measuring 35m in height and is among the famous tourist attractions in Johor Bahru. This historical building features unique carvings and is influenced by the Art Deco aesthetic.

== History ==
Istana Bukit Serene was a gift from the Johor government to the late Sultan Ibrahim Sultan Abu Bakar in conjunction with the ruler's 40th anniversary as the sultan of Johor.

=== Japanese Occupation (1942–1945) ===
Sultan Ibrahim became a personal friend of Tokugawa Yoshichika during the 1920s. Tokugawa was a member of the Tokugawa clan, and his ancestors were military leaders (shōgun in Japanese) which ruled Japan from the 16th to the 19th centuries. When the Japanese invaded Malaya, Tokugawa accompanied General Yamashita Tomoyuki's troops and was warmly received by Sultan Ibrahim when they reached Johor Bahru at the end of January 1942.

Yamashita and his officers then stationed themselves at Istana Bukit Serene and the state secretariat building, Sultan Ibrahim Building to plan for the invasion of Singapore. From the palace, he had a good view of the positions of the Australian Army and Navy across the Straits of Johor. Yamashita used the palace tower as viewing point as it had a bird's eye view of Singapore.

Although advised by his top military personnel that the palace was an easy target, Yamashita was confident that the British Army would not attack Istana Bukit Serene because it was the pride and possession of the Sultan of Johor. Yamashita's prediction was correct as the British Army did not attack the palace.

Shortly before the Japanese surrendered in 1945, Sultan Ibrahim was expelled from his residence at Istana Bukit Serene and was forced to reside at Istana Pasir Pelangi, the crown prince's palace.

== Historical events ==
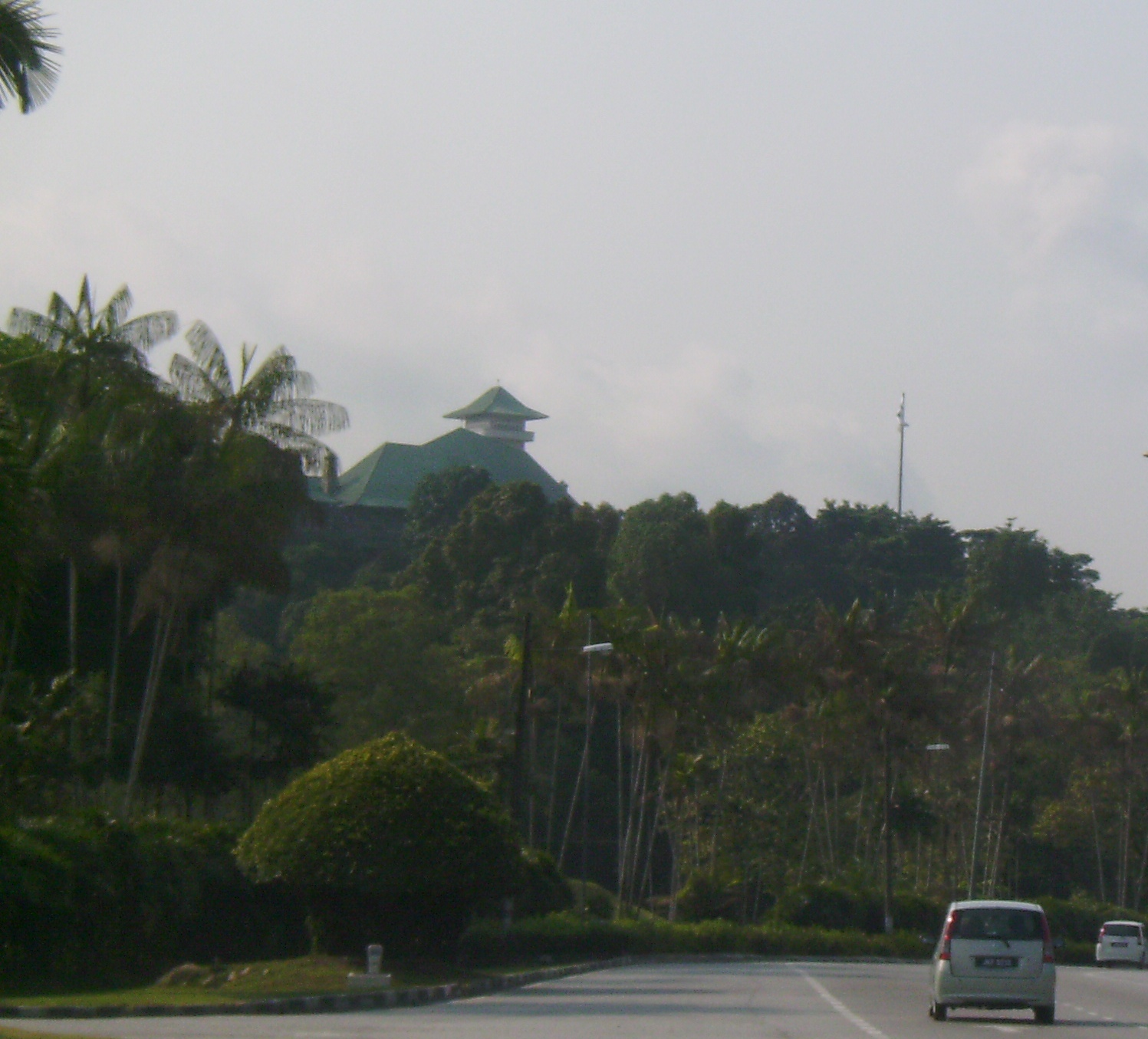
Istana Bukit Serene seen from afar.

Historical events held at the Istana Bukit Serene include:

- venue for the Sultan Ibrahim Sultan Iskandar's investiture ceremony in conjunction with his 55th birthday in 2014.
- Akad nikah (solemnization) ceremony of Tunku Mahkota Johor Tunku Ismail Sultan Ibrahim and his consort Che Puan Khaleeda Bustamam was held on 24 October 2014.

== See also ==
- Istana Besar
- Istana Pasir Pelangi
- Pasir Pelangi
- House of Temenggong
- Monarchies of Malaysia
