= Ungku Tun Aminah Jamek Mosque =

Mosque in Johor Bahru, Johor, Malaysia

Ungku Tun Aminah Mosque
- Masjid Jamek Ungku Tun Aminah
- Location within Johor

Religion
- Affiliation: Sunni Islam

Location
- Location: Johor Bahru, Johor, Malaysia
- Interactive map of Ungku Tun Aminah Mosque
- Coordinates: 1°29′43.5″N 103°42′07.4″E

Architecture
- Type: Mosque

The Ungku Tun Aminah Mosque (Malay: Masjid Jamek Ungku Tun Aminah) is a mosque in Tampoi, Johor Bahru, Johor, Malaysia. The mosque is similar to National Mosque in Kuala Lumpur.

== See also ==
- Islam in Malaysia
