= Istana Besar =

Royal residence in Johor, Malaysia

Coordinates: 1°27′18.0″N 103°45′22.91″E

Grand Palace
- Istana Besar
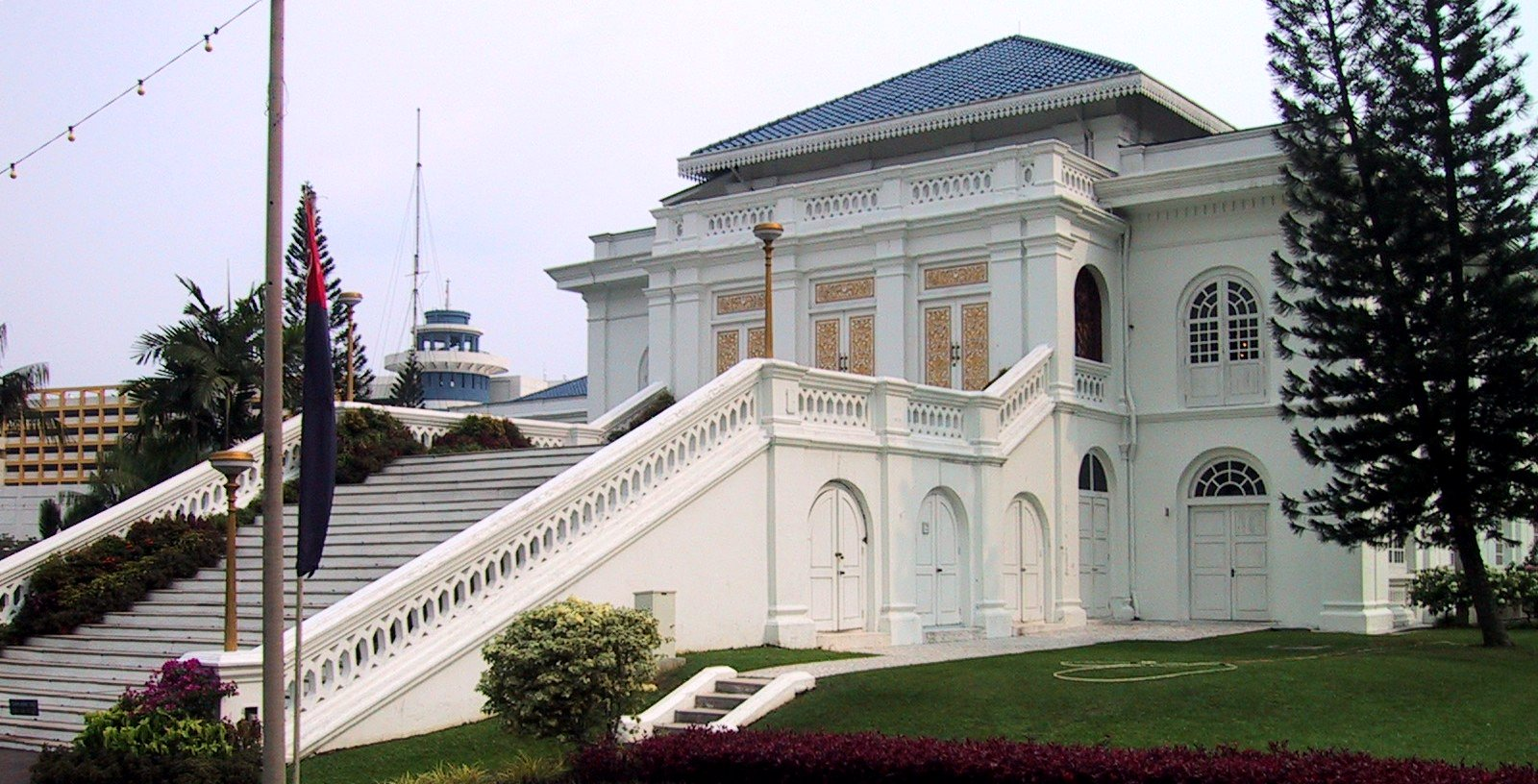
- Interactive map of the Grand Palace area

General information
- Type: Palace
- Architectural style: Anglo-Malay
- Location: Johor Bahru, Johor, Malaysia
- Completed: 1866

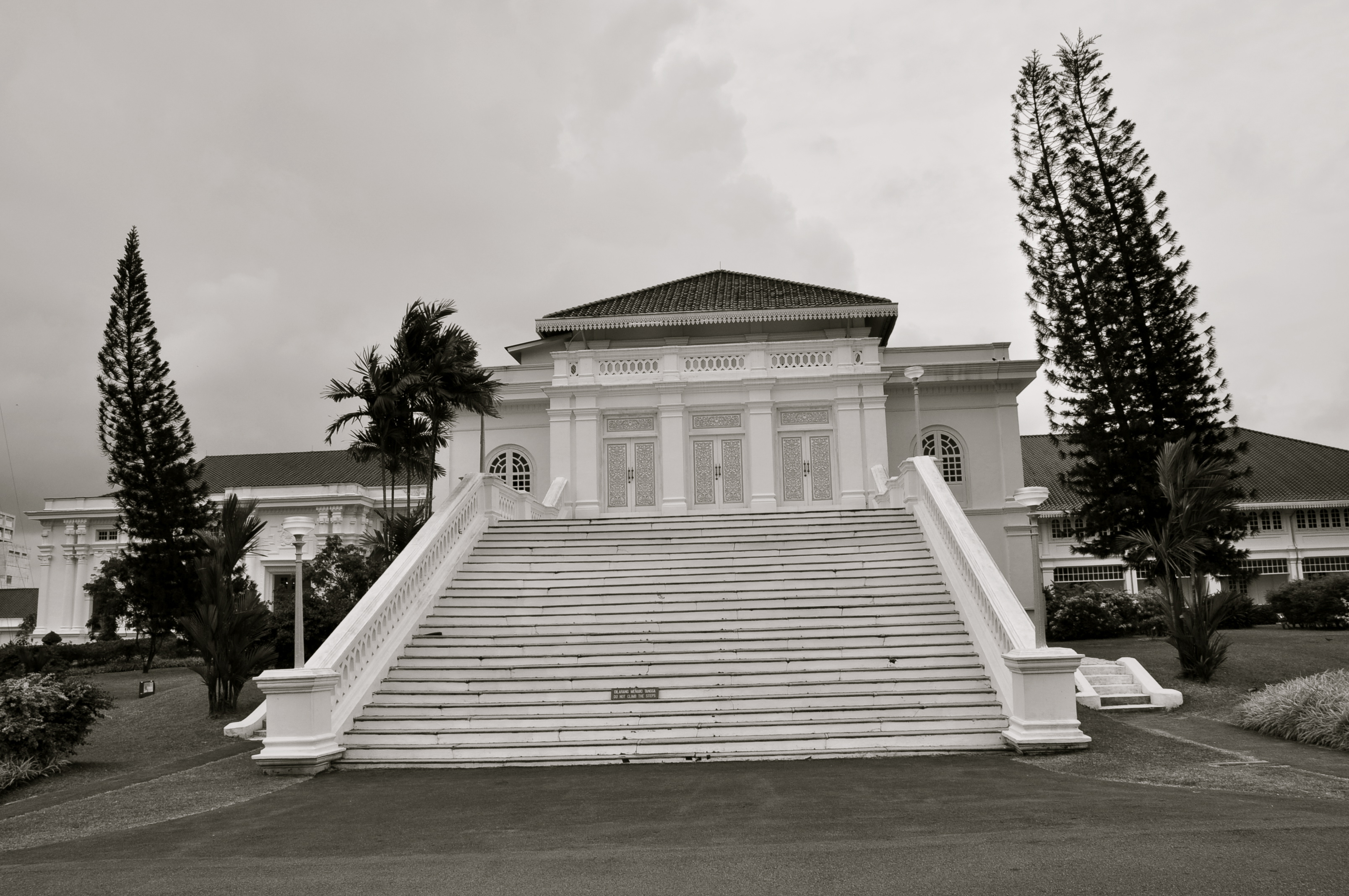
Steps to the main hall of Istana Besar, Johor Bahru

The Istana Besar or Grand Palace is the royal palace of the Sultan of Johor and is located in Johor Bahru, Malaysia.

== Overview ==
Located in the city of Johor Bahru, the palace was built in 1866 during the reign of Sultan Abu Bakar. The palace overlooks the Straits of Johor and features Anglo-Malay architecture, characterised by its dome of Malay design with its blue roof of Anglo influence.

The Istana Besar is currently used only for investitures, state banquets and royal functions.

=== Royal Museum ===
Within the Istana Besar is the Royal Abu Bakar Museum, which was renovated to become a museum in 1982 and officially opened in 1990. It is a living museum which houses a collection of royal heirlooms, artifacts and a record of the history of the state's royal family. The Royal Museum was closed to the public from January 2012.

== See also ==
- Istana Bukit Serene
- Istana Pasir Pelangi
- Pasir Pelangi
