= Pasir Pelangi Royal Mosque =

Mosque in Johor Bahru, Johor, Malaysia

- Masjid Diraja Pasir Pelangi
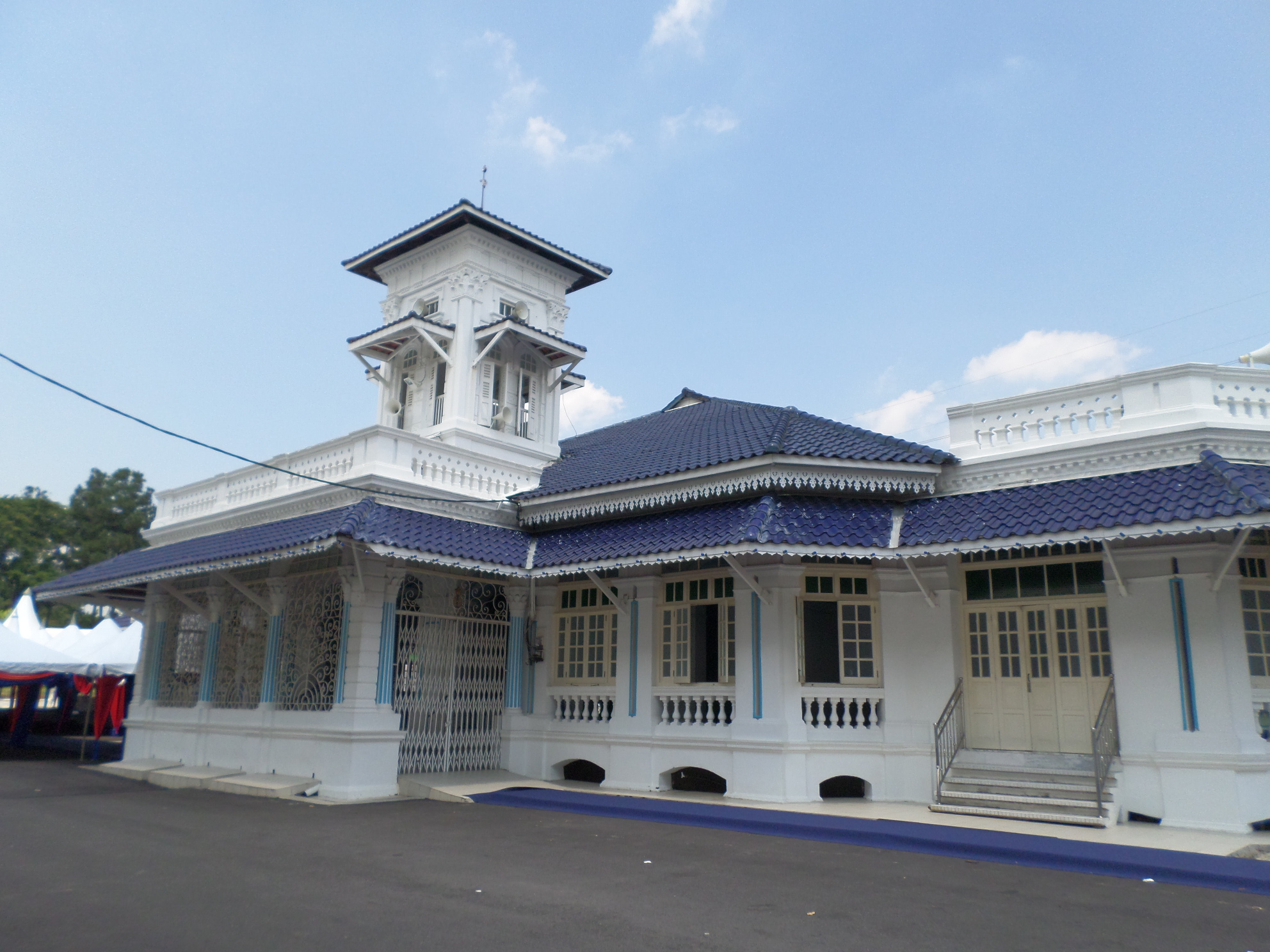

- Location within Johor

Religion
- Affiliation: Islam

Location
- Location: Johor Bahru, Johor, Malaysia
- Interactive map of Pasir Pelangi Royal Mosque
- Coordinates: 1°29′17.7″N 103°47′08.4″E

Architecture
- Type: mosque
- Minaret: 1

Pasir Pelangi Royal Mosque (Malay: Masjid Diraja Pasir Pelangi) is a Johor's royal mosque located in Pasir Pelangi, Johor Bahru District, Johor, Malaysia. It was constructed in the 1920s. The mosque bears a similar architectural design to the Sultan Abu Bakar State Mosque.

== Transportation ==
The mosque is accessible by BAS.MY route J21.

== See also ==
- Islam in Malaysia
