= Permaisuri Zarith Sofiah Opera House =

Opera house in Johor Bahru, Malaysia

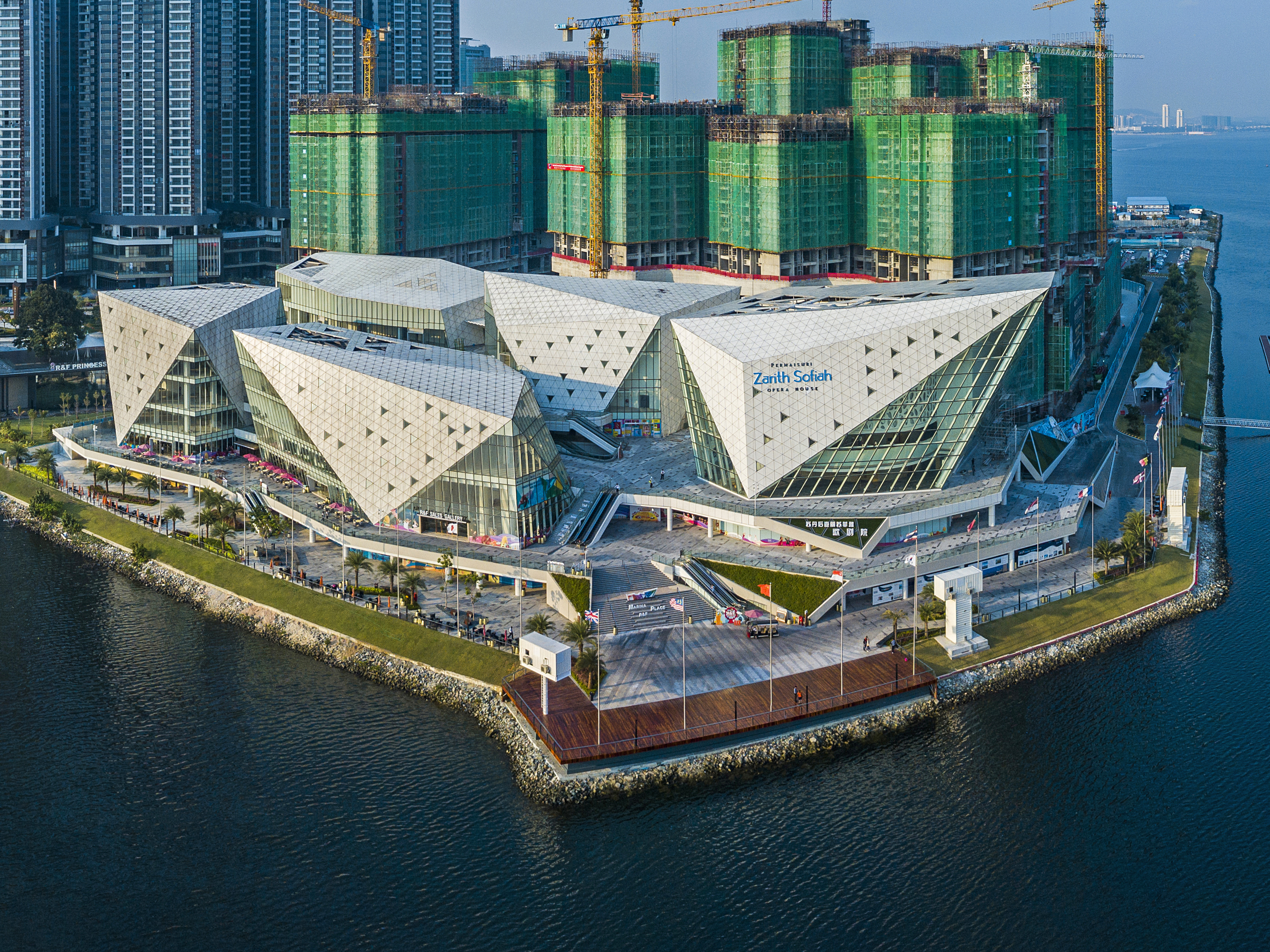
- Interactive map of Permaisuri Zarith Sofiah Opera House
- Location: Johor Bahru, Johor, Malaysia
- Coordinates: 1.45681°N 103.77031°E
- Type: Opera house

Construction
- Opened: January 2020

Permaisuri Zarith Sofiah Opera House (Chinese: 苏丹后查丽苏菲雅歌剧院) is an opera house in Johor Bahru, Malaysia. It opened in January 2020. It is the first opera house in the state of Johor. The architecture of the opera house was inspired by diamonds. It is named after Raja Zarith Sofiah, the wife of Ibrahim Iskandar, the Sultan of Johor.

The opera house is part of the R&F Princess Cove residential development, which includes high-rise condominium towers and a retail shopping mall, the R&F Mall. The building sits across 114,430 square feet (10,631 m^{2}) of reclaimed land, while the main performance hall contains 600 seats. The opera house faces the Johor–Singapore Causeway, which links Johor Bahru to Singapore. In 2023, the New Straits Times reported that the building's exterior had accumulated excessive dirt and grime.
