= Kolam Ayer Mosque =

Mosque in Johor Bahru, Johor, Malaysia

- Masjid Kolam Ayer
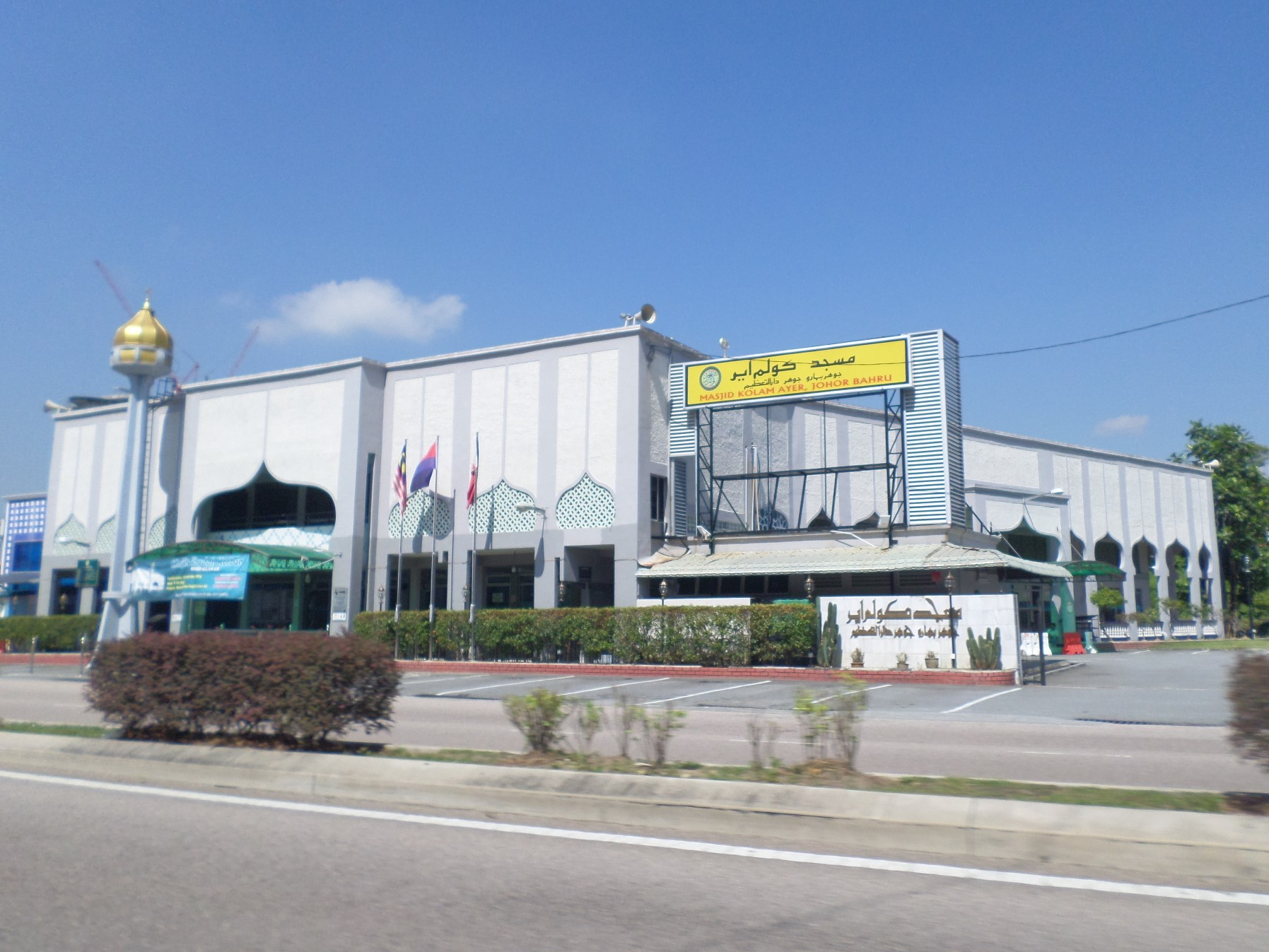

- Location within Johor

Religion
- Affiliation: Islam
- Branch/tradition: Sunni

Location
- Location: Johor Bahru, Johor, Malaysia
- Interactive map of Kolam Ayer Mosque
- Coordinates: 1°28′07.0″N 103°44′10.9″E

Architecture
- Type: mosque

The Kolam Ayer Mosque (Malay: Masjid Kolam Ayer) is a mosque in Kampung Nong Chik, Johor Bahru, Johor, Malaysia. The mosque is located on Jalan Kolam Air.

== See also ==
- Islam in Malaysia
