= Johor Zoo =

Zoo in Johor Bahru, Johor, Malaysia

Johor Zoo Zoo Johor
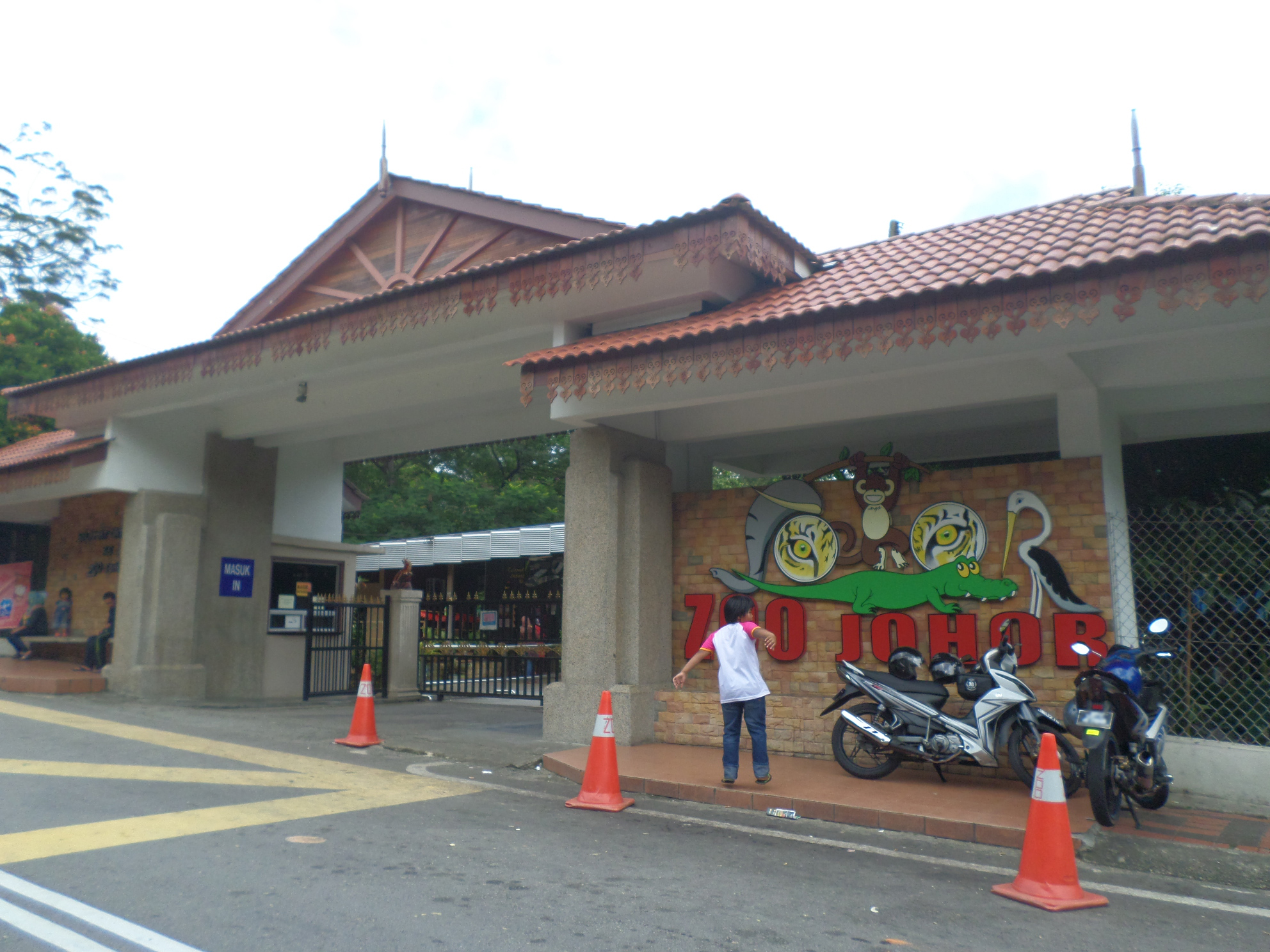
- Interactive map of Johor Zoo; Zoo Johor
- 1°27′27.0″N 103°45′08.1″E
- Date opening: 1928
- Location: Johor Bahru, Johor, Malaysia
- Land area: 12.5 ha (31 acres)
- Website: Official website

The Johor Zoo (Malay: Zoo Johor; Jawi: زو جوهر) is a 12.5 ha (31 acres)-wide zoo in Johor Bahru, Johor, Malaysia, it is the oldest zoo in Malaysia. It has more than 100 animal species in the zoo displayed in 28 exhibits such as macaws, indian peafowl, great white pelican, storks, turtles, tortoises, ostriches, emus, southern cassowaries, chimpanzees, gorillas, orangutans, Asian elephants, dromedary camels, chital deers, mousedeers, malayan tapirs, king cobra, raccoons, malayan porcupines, rhinoceros hornbill, mandrills, celebes crested macaque, marmosets, squirrel monkey, brown capuchin, macaques, hippos, saltwater crocodiles, pythons, iguanas, civets, binturong, leopard cat, asian small-clawed otters, white handed gibbons, sambar deer, gaur, flamingoes, horses, sun bear, African lion and Malayan tigers. It is located 1 km from the city centre and is the only zoo administered by a state government in Malaysia.

The zoo was opened in 1928 by His Royal Highness Almarhum Sultan Sir Ibrahim Ibni Almarhum Sultan Sir Abu Bakar and named as the Kebun Binatang, which is Malay for Animal Garden, or zoo and was the first of its kind in Southeast Asia at that time. On 1 April 1962, the zoo was handed over to Johor State Government and opened to the public that same year.

== Transportation ==
The zoo is accessible by Muafakat Bus route P-101 and Shuttle Z00 bus.

== See also ==
- List of tourist attractions in Malaysia
