= Istana Pasir Pelangi =

Malaysian palace

Pasir Pelangi Palace
- Istana Pasir Pelangi
- Location within Malaysia

General information
- Type: palace
- Location: Johor Bahru, Johor, Malaysia
- Coordinates: 1°28′41.2″N 103°46′54.0″E
- Year built: 1911

Technical details
- Floor count: 2

The Istana Pasir Pelangi (Pasir Pelangi Palace) is a royal palace of the Tunku Mahkota of Johor. It is located in the royal town of Pasir Pelangi, Johor Bahru, Johor, Malaysia.

== History ==
The palace was first built in 1911.

After Ibrahim Iskandar of Johor ascended the throne as the Sultan of Johor in 2010, he ordered both of the Istana Besar and Istana Bukit Serene to be renovated, after which he temporarily resided in this palace until the renovation of the said palaces were completed.
