= R&F Mall =

Shopping mall in Johor Bahru, Johor, Malaysia

- 新山富力广场
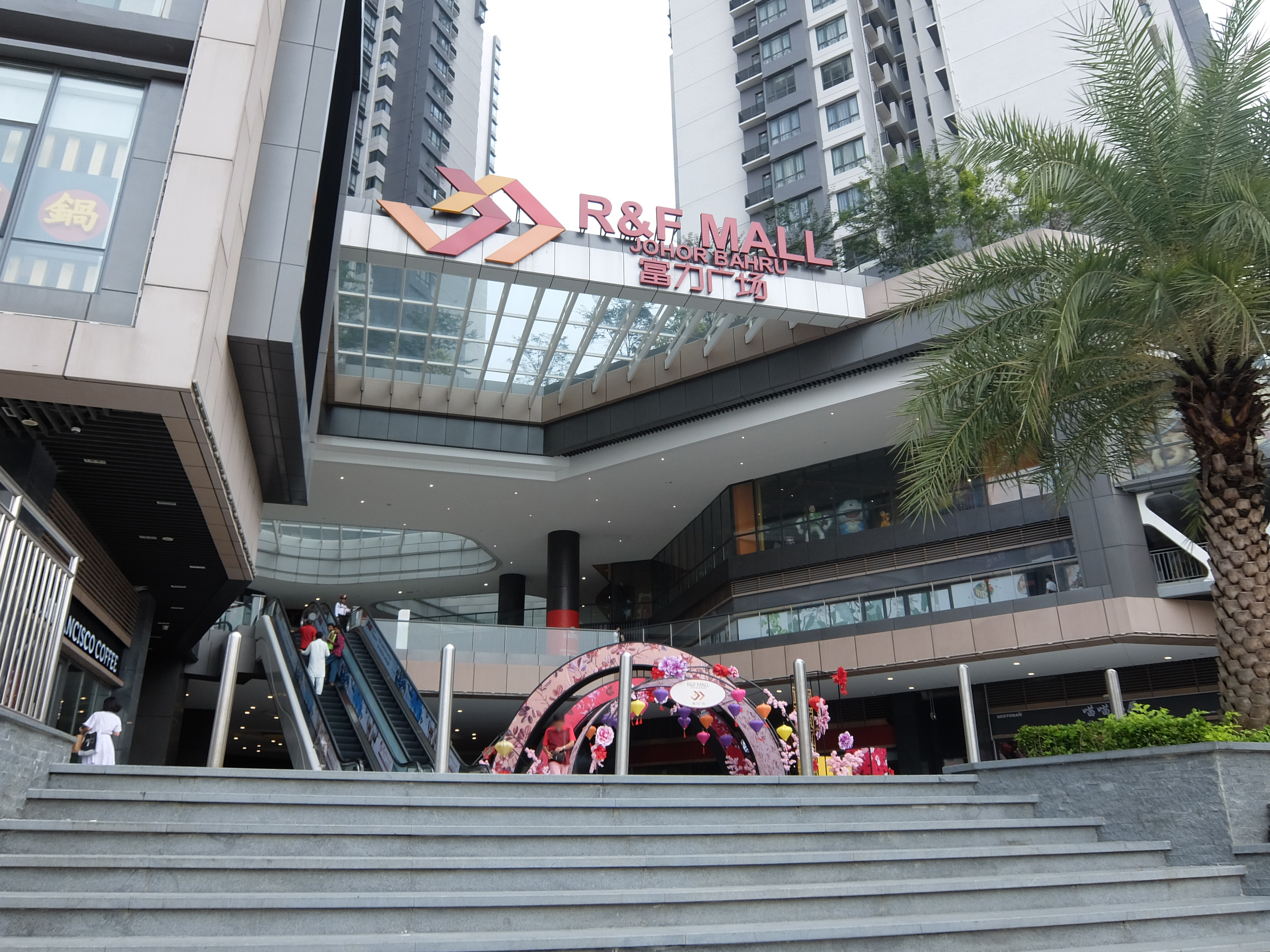
- Coordinates: 1°27′34″N 103°46′09″E
- Address: Johor Bahru, Johor, Malaysia
- Opened: 28 March 2019; 7 years ago
- Developer: R&F Properties
- Owner: R&F Properties
- Floors: 3
- Parking: Yes
- Public transit: JB Sentral

R&F Mall is a shopping mall integrated as part of R&F Princess Cove, a mixed-use integrated residential and commercial development in Tanjung Puteri, Johor Bahru, Johor, Malaysia.

== History ==
The shopping mall was opened on 28 March 2019.

== Architecture ==
R&F Mall is integrated below the first phase of the R&F Princess Cove residential towers. It sits adjacent to R&F Marina Place, a commercial center incorporating a yacht club and Permaisuri Zarith Sofiah Opera House, the first international opera house in Johor which spans 114,430 square feet and has an audience capacity of 600 people. The jewel-shaped opera house, which reflects its identity as the "Jewel of the South", was named after Raja Zarith Sofiah, the Permaisuri of Johor and incumbent Queen of Malaysia.

The mall features an open-space concept layout, taking advantage of natural lighting and ventilation due to its adjacency to the Straits of Johor.

== Business ==
R&F Mall was part of the first phrase of the R&F Princess Cove integrated development by R&F Properties.

The shopping mall's anchor tenants include hypermarket chain Jaya Grocer and home improvement retailer MR.DIY. It also houses various dining, lifestyle and fashion outlets.

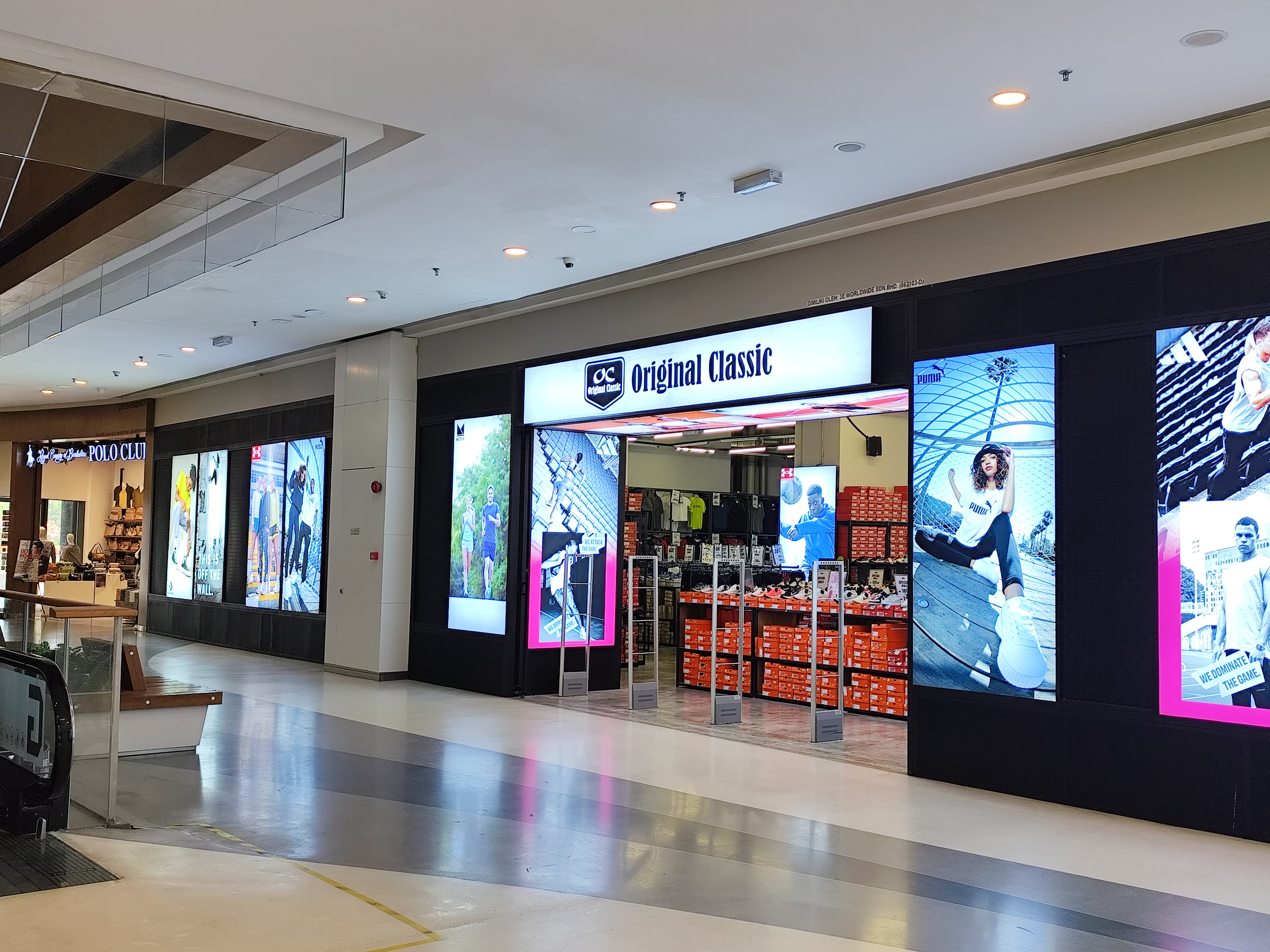
Original Classic outlet located on Ground Floor

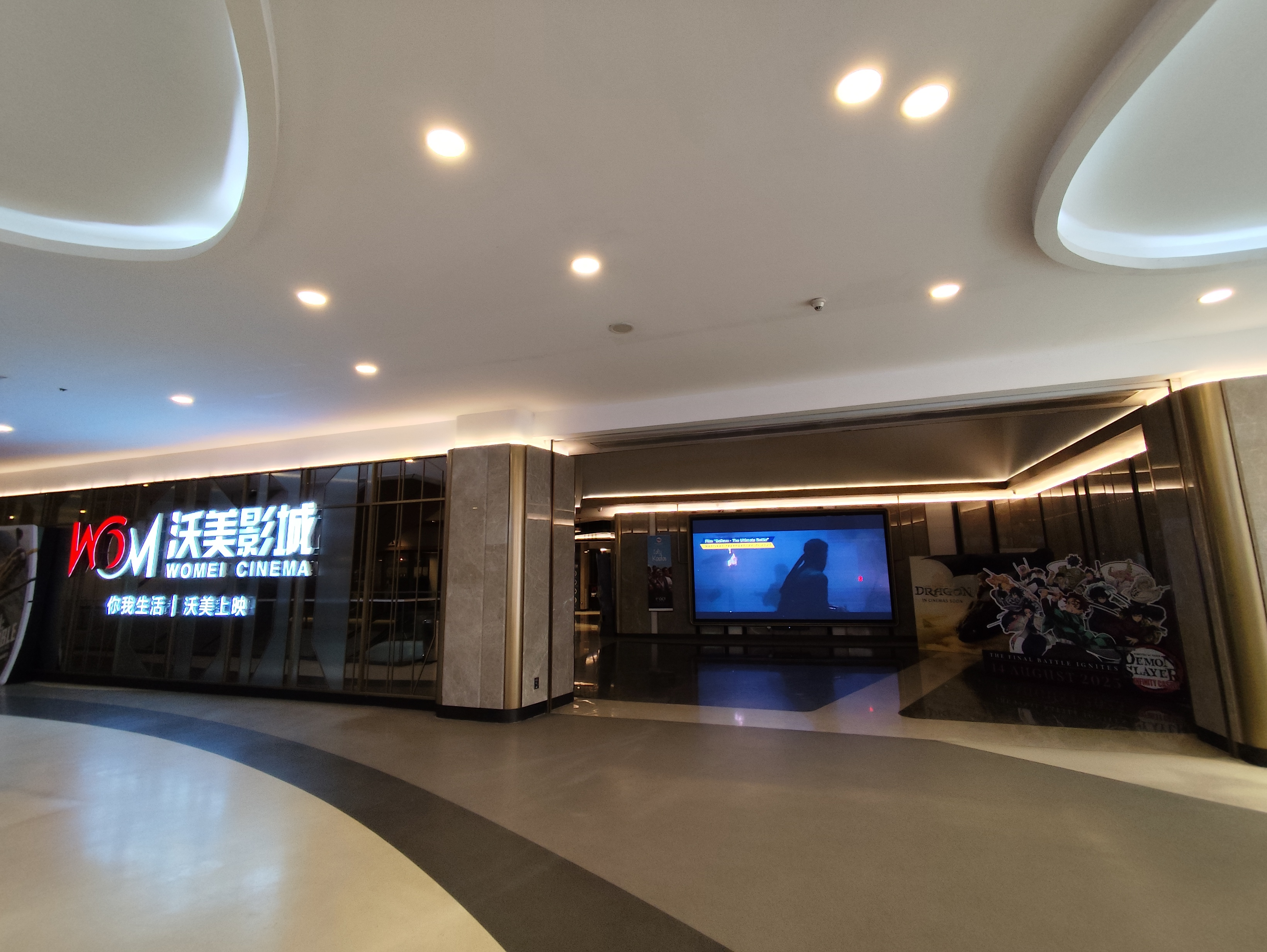
Womei Cinema located on Level 1

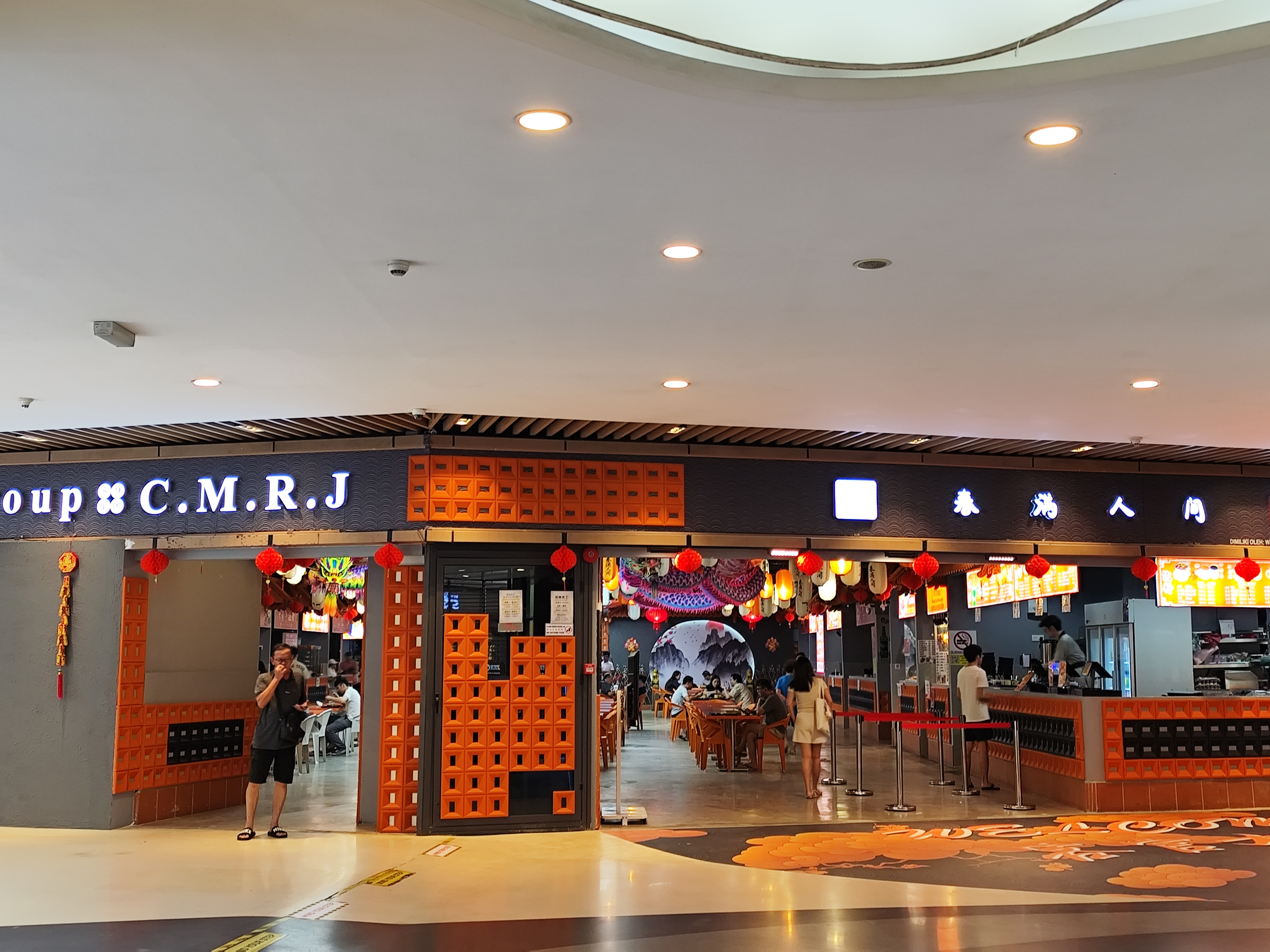
Food court located on Level 2, taken in January 2026.

== Accessibility ==
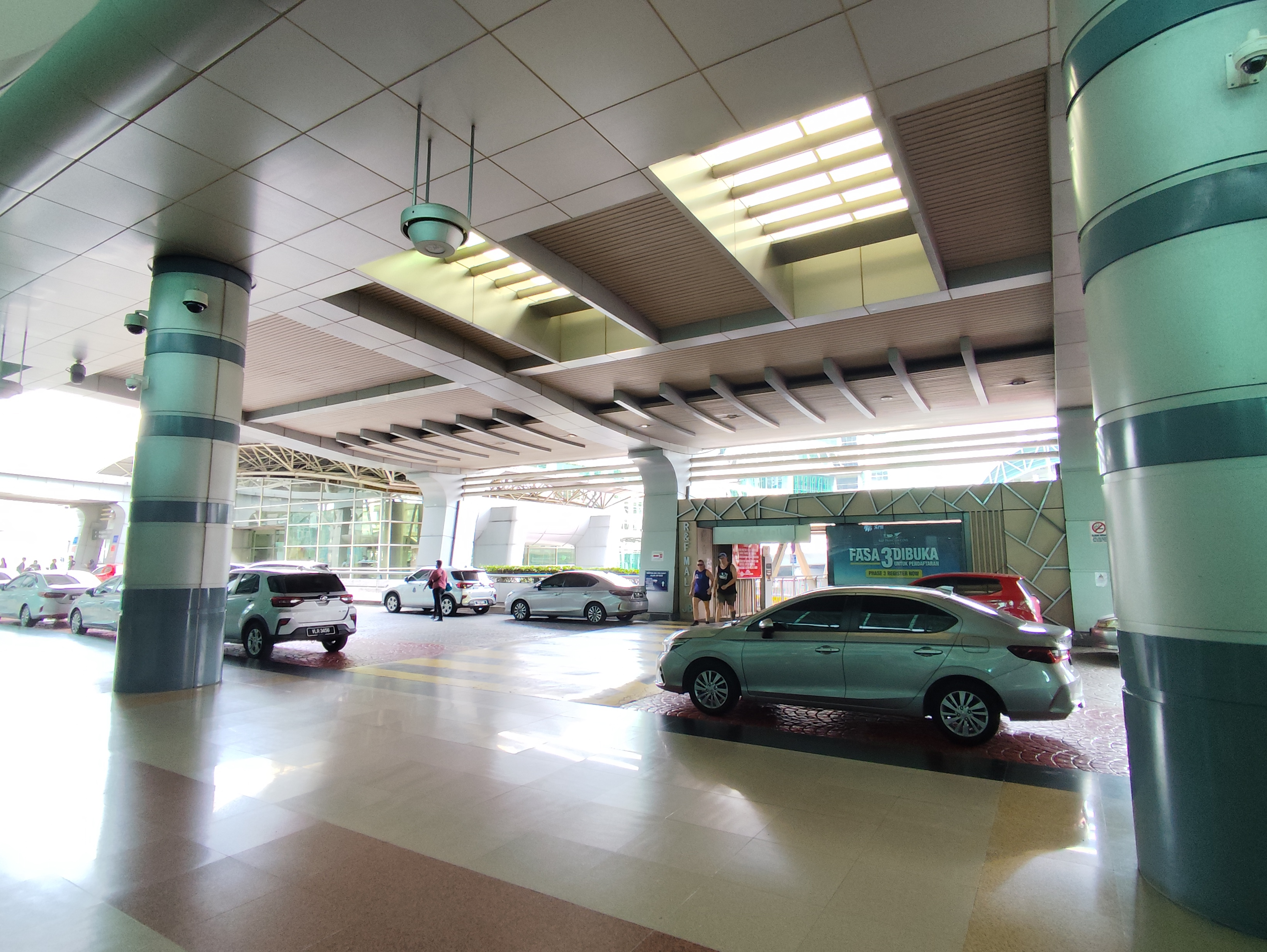
Entrance to the overhead linkbridge to R&F Mall, at the pick-up point of Johor Bahru Sentral station.

The shopping mall is directly accessible via. an overhead link bridge from Johor Bahru Sentral Station (and Sultan Iskandar Building, the co-located Checkpoint, Immigration and Quarrantine (CIQ) complex).

Since 15 August 2025, the mall is also served by a free day-time shuttle bus route, operated by Causeway Link, that runs between the mall's bus boarding point, and JB Sentral Bus Terminal.

== See also ==
- List of shopping malls in Malaysia
