= Taman Melodies =

Suburb in Johor Bahru, Johor, Malaysia

Coordinates: 1°29′N 103°46′E

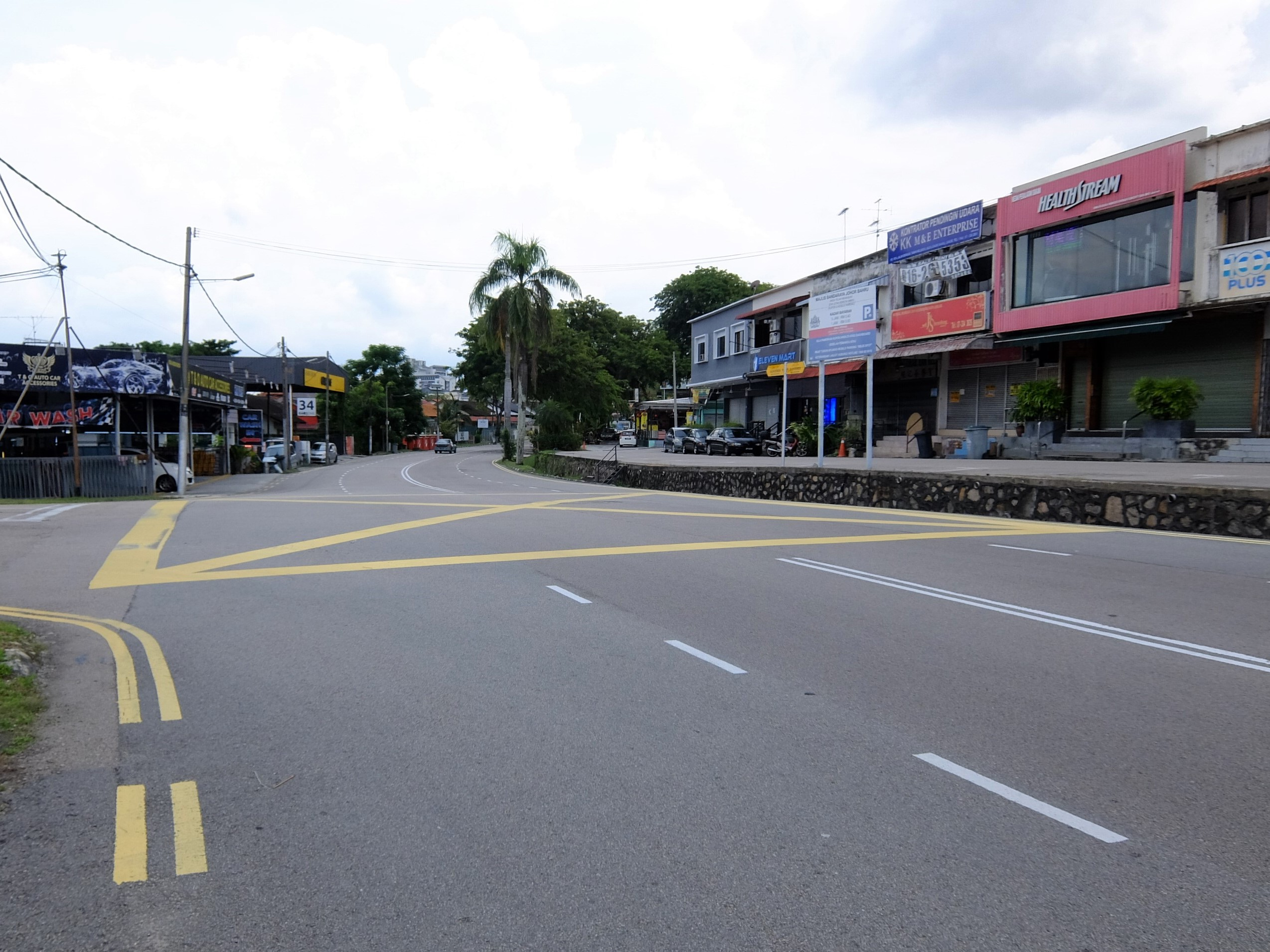
Taman Melodies highway

Taman Melodies is a townships located in Johor Bahru, Johor, Malaysia. Taman Melodies is near to Taman Sentosa, Taman Suria and Taman Kebun Teh.
