= Century Garden =

Housing development in Johor Bahru, Malaysia

Century Garden (Malay: Taman Abad) is one of the earliest housing development in Johor Bahru, Johor, Malaysia. The housing ranges from expensive bungalow houses built at the top of the valley to older, more modest single-storey terrace houses built in the 1960s. It was developed by a visionary and prominent Johor Bahru businessman, Yap Siew Cheng (1918–1970). Ambitious and daring at that time because its location was considered quite far out of Johor Bahru town and surrounded by rubber estates.

The Holiday Plaza shopping centre is in the estate. Its strategic location, close to the city's central business district makes it a sought residential area with facilities and amenities and hotels close at hand. Other notable landmarks located in Taman Abad include Metropolis Tower, Menara MAA, New York Hotel and DNP plaza, all of which are located along Jalan Dato Suleiman.

It is also unique and notable for its neighbourhood watch program started in 1999 by long-term resident, Suzie Yap. The ongoing neighbourhood watch program is staffed and funded purely by the residents themselves on a voluntary basis and has succeeded in reducing crime in the area significantly. It was also noted that another old male resident helped to set up road blocks along Jalan Wijaya to control traffic inflow. However, such measures were ridiculed by some residents for there were few automobiles travelling along Jalan Wijaya long before the road blocks were set up.

== Accessibility ==
Taman Abad is connected to Jalan Dato Abdullah Tahir and Jalan Dato Suleiman through Tebrau Highway.
