= Church of the Immaculate Conception (Johor) =

Coordinates: 1°27′54.7″N 103°45′31.7″E

- Malay: Gereja Kandungan Suci; Chinese: 圣母无染原罪天主堂; Tamil: அமலோற்பவ அன்னை தேவாலயம்
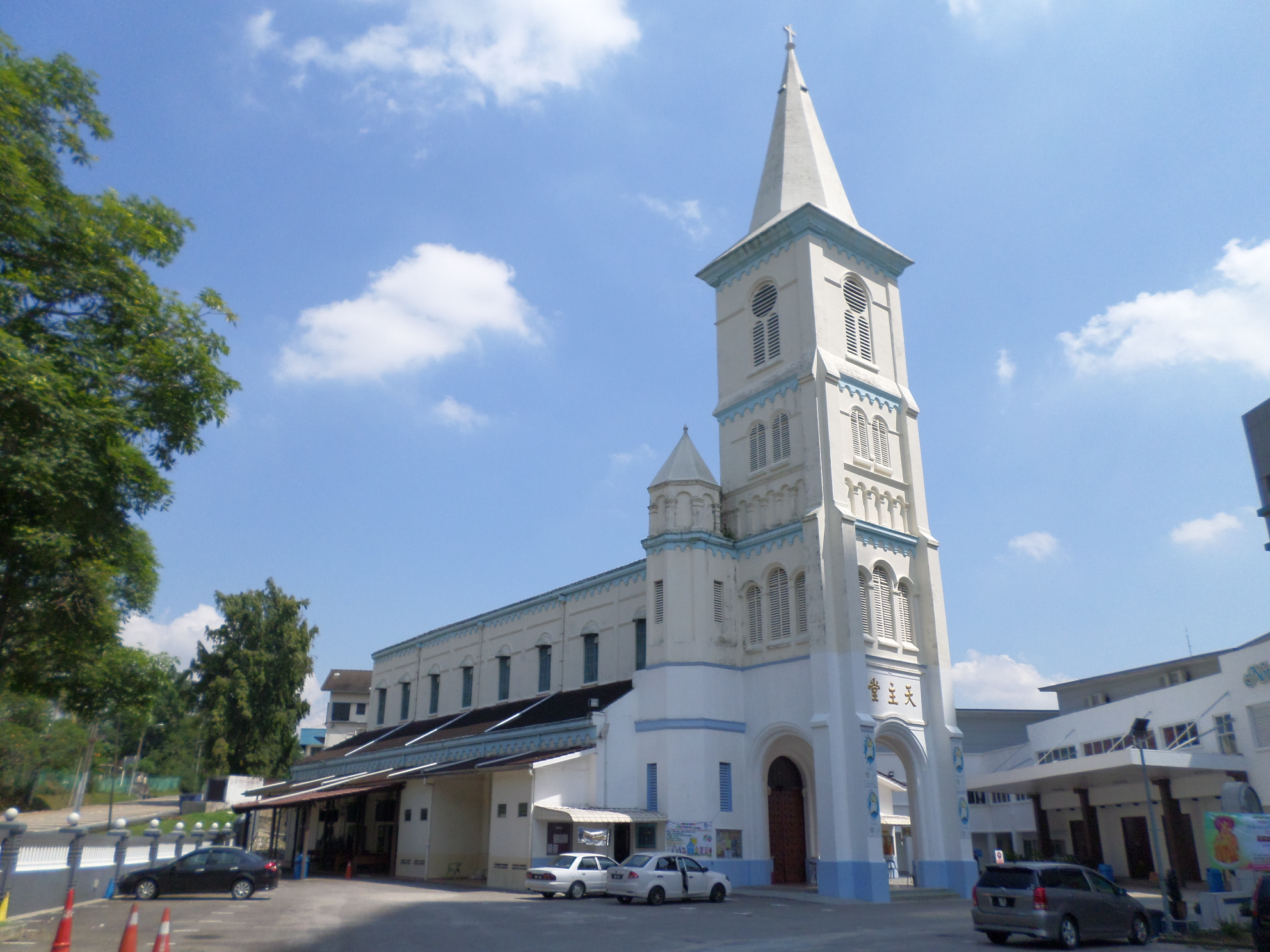
- Church of the Immaculate Conception
- Location: Johor Bahru, Johor, Malaysia
- Denomination: Roman Catholic
- Website: cicjb.org

History
- Status: Active

Architecture
- Architect: C. Saleilles
- Completed: 1883 (original building); 1927 (current building)

Administration
- Diocese: Melaka-Johor

Clergy
- Bishop: Bernard Paul
- Priest: Edward Rayappan

The Church of the Immaculate Conception is a Roman Catholic church in Johor Bahru, Johor, Malaysia. It is the oldest church in Johor Bahru, built in 1927, An earlier church was built in 1883 by Casimir-Jean Saleilles and was dedicated to Our Lady of Lourdes.

== History ==
The beginnings saw the establishment of Johor as an outstation of Serangoon in 1881. Saleilles visited parishioners by boat. He also visited the leper hospital.

The original church of Our Lady of Lourdes was inaugurated in 1883 on a piece of land given by Sultan Abu Bakar.

Its replacement, the Church of the Immaculate Conception, was built by M. Duvelle.

Daily masses are held in four languages.

== See also ==
- Religion in Malaysia
