= Taman Suria =

Township in Johor, Malaysia

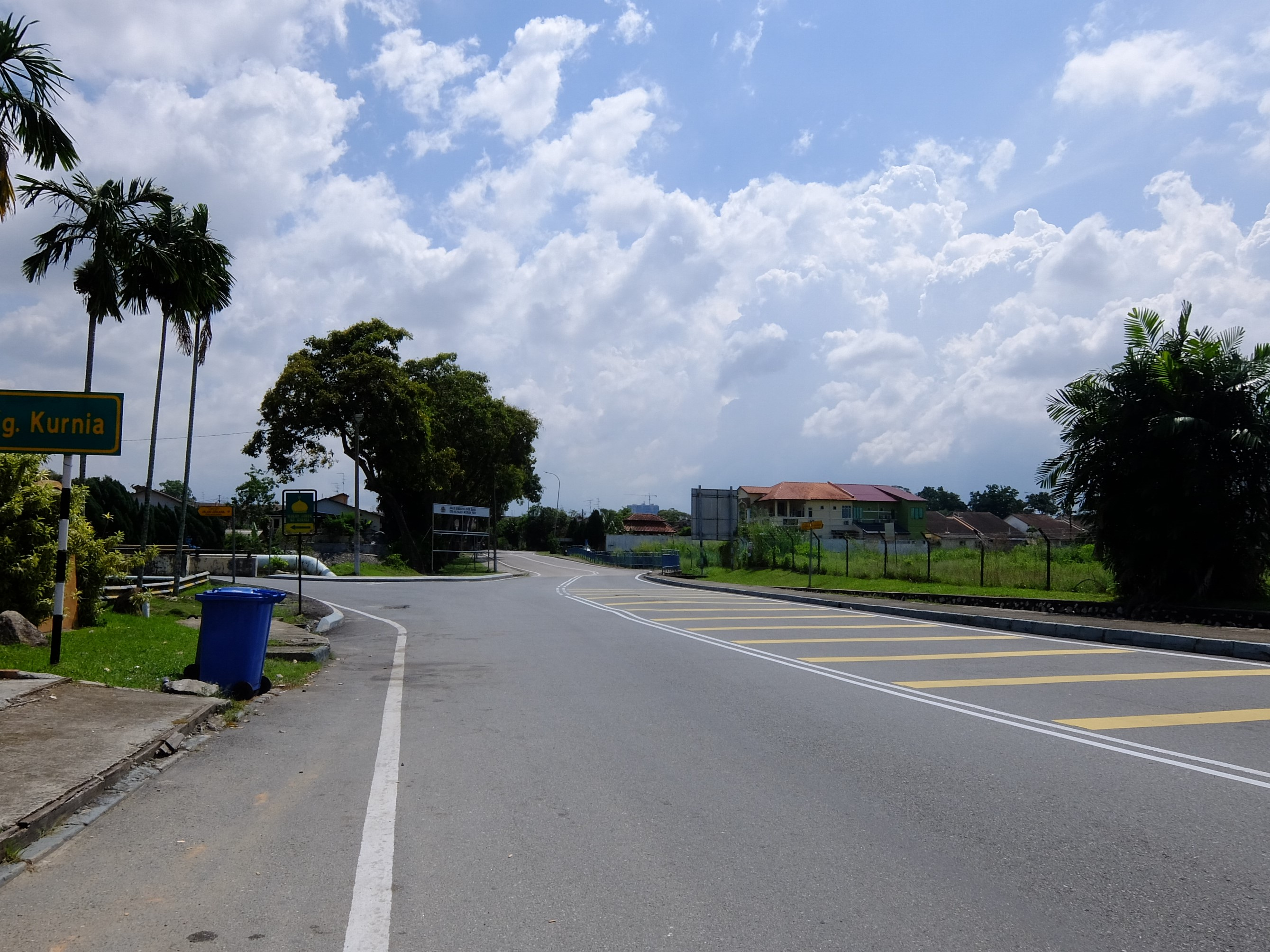
Taman Suria

Taman Suria is a suburb in the city of Johor Bahru, Johor, Malaysia. The elementary school Sekolah Kebangsaan Taman Suria is located here.
