= Kuching High School =

- SMJK Kuching High 古晋中学(国民型)
- Kuching High School logo

Location
- Jalan Mathie; Kuching, Sarawak, 93100; Malaysia
- Coordinates: 1°33′17″N 110°20′58″E

Information
- Other names: Kuching High National-type Secondary School (Malay: Sekolah Menengah Jenis Kebangsaan Kuching High) (Chinese: 古晋中学(国民型))
- Former names: Kuching High Aided Secondary School (Sekolah Menengah Bantuan Kuching High) (1963-2002); Chung Hua Middle School No. 2 (古晉中華第二中學) (1958-1963); Chung Hua Middle School (中華中學) (1946-1958); Min Teck Junior Middle School (民德初級中學) (1916-1941)
- School type: public, secondary
- Motto: 公 (gong), 毅 (yi), 诚 (cheng), 朴 (pu) (Justice, Perseverance, Honesty, Simplicity)
- Established: 1916
- Founder: Kuching Teochew Association(古晉潮州公會)
- School board: SMK Kuching High Board of Management
- Session: Double
- School code: YFB1201
- Chairperson: ABS Vincent Chew Boon Shen
- Principal: Jong Yian Chong
- Teaching staff: 95
- Age: 13 to 18
- Enrollment: 1620 (2022)
- Language: Malay, English and Chinese
- Campus size: 3 acres (1.2 ha)
- Campus type: Urban
- Houses: Azam; Berani; Cemerlang; Gigih; Tabah; Yakin
- Colours: Black, yellow, red
- Accreditation: Ministry of Education
- Newspaper: The Bulletine
- Yearbook: Highians
- Website: insarawak.com/kuchinghigh/
- Last updated: 13 November 2022

Kuching High School (KHS; Malay: SMJK Tinggi Kuching; Chinese: 古晋中学(国民型)), officially Kuching High National-type Secondary School (Malay: Sekolah Menengah Jenis Kebangsaan Tinggi Kuching; Chinese: 古晋中学(国民型)), is a national-type chinese secondary school in Kuching, the capital of the Malaysian state of Sarawak. The school provides secondary education from Transition to Form 5, which culminates in the sitting of the public examinations of Form Three Assessment in Form 3 and the Malaysian Certificate of Education in Form 5. The school was founded in 1916 as a Chinese private school and from 1963 until today it became a Government-aided school.

== Location ==
The school is located on a 3-acre (1.2-hectare) site at Jalan Mathie in Kuching, the capital city of Sarawak, a state in East Malaysia.

== History ==
=== Background ===
Kuching High School was founded in 1916 by Kuching Teochew Association (古晉潮州公會), an association for the Teochew people in Kuching, as Min Teck Junior Middle School (民德初級中學) as a self-founded Chinese school. It was initially located at Jalan Batu. From 1941 to 1946 the school was closed due to the Japanese Occupation. It was reopened in 1946 but under the new name Chung Hua Middle School (中華中學) as well as a new management which was a Joint Board of Management consisting of representatives from thirteen associations in Kuching. At the time it was the only Chinese middle school reopened after the Occupation. In 1958, another Chinese middle school was established at Jalan Pending and it was named as Chung Hua Middle School No. 1 (古晋中华第一中学), hence then Chung Hua Middle School was renamed again

as Chung Hua Middle School No. 2 (古晉中華第二中學). It was one of the four Chung Hua Middle Schools under the Board.

After Sarawak joined Malaysia on 16 September 1963, the Sarawak Education Department introduced a ten-year Conversion Plan to bring all Chinese middle schools in the state into the national education system, whereby they would receive government funding and the medium of instruction, which was then in Chinese, would be converted to English, although Chinese would still be taught as a compulsory language subject. Chung Hua Middle School No. 2 decided to be nationalised to receive the funding, thus Teochew Association retook the school's management under the auspice of the parents and the approval of the Education Department. It was then renamed as Kuching High Aided Secondary School (Sekolah Menengah Bantuan Kuching High), adopting the name 'Kuching High' to assimilate into the system, as well being designated as a sekolah menengah bantuan or aided secondary school. Meanwhile, the other Chung Hua Middle Schools opted out of the plan and thus become the non-aided Chinese independent high schools.

In 1963, the first intake of students under the new national designation had 830 students and 25 classes in both the Chinese and English streams.

In 2002, with the restructuring and renaming process of all government and government-aided schools in the country the school was designated as a sekolah menengah kebangsaan or national secondary school and thus adopted its current official name.

=== Building ===
In early 1963, the school consisted of a 7 wooden school blocks, such as the administration block built in 1932 which included the general office, staff room, science laboratory and library, as well as six two-storey classroom blocks, two basketball courts, one badminton court and a store-room. In 1974, a two-storey partially wooden science laboratory block was constructed. Due to growing student enrolment, in 1977, the one-storey Block 2 was reconstructed into a two-storey classroom block and the store-room into a three-storey concrete block, which housed science laboratories and uniformed societies, to alleviate overcrowding. In 1988, a four-storey concrete block was built on the basketball court and named Block 6, with the top three floors utilised as classrooms and the ground floor as the canteen, while in 1990, another four-storey concrete block was built to replace Block 6 and named Block 7, with the top-most floor as the science laboratories, ground floor for co-curricular activities and the rest as classrooms.

Block 4 and 5 were demolished to make way for a new three-storey concrete block with a hall, theatre, library and living skills education rooms in 1996. However, it was a failed project as the plan was not approved by the local authorities since the site was made government's reserved land.

In 2000, several parts of the school was renovated, including a new great hall on the badminton/tennis court, a steel canopy joining adjacent Block 6 and 7, a garden between Block 1 and 3 and a concrete wall aligning the school compound along Mathie Road. The following year, the school's jogathon provided MYR 250,000 for building a computer room. In the end of 2002, a cooperatives room and an auditorium was built, while counselor's room was revamped from an old classroom.

In 2004, the roof of the great hall was repaired in response to one that was blown away in a storm and in 2007, the great hall was renovated.

In early 2008, the two-storey Junior Science Block which was an extension of the administration block, consisting the junior science laboratories, red crescent office and staff's toilets together with Block 2 was declared unsafe by the Public Works Department (PWD) due to termite problem and had since become unoccupied.

However, before the school's Board of management received a grant from the Education Ministry to renovate the unsafe blocks, the administration block and Junior Science Block was razed in a fire on 2 December 2008, causing the school in need of MYR 500,000 for temporarily housing its staff. Construction of the razed blocks would be divided into two phases, viz. phase one for the construction of junior science block and classroom blocks, whereas phase two for administrative block that includes an office, a library, classrooms and a conference room, costing MYR 3.4 million and MYR 2.2 million respectively. On 23 December 2008, an EGM was held by the Teochew Association to approve amount of MYR 3.2 million to rebuild the block, of which MYR 200,000 for a temporary administration office, and the remaining MYR 3 million to rebuild Block 1 and admin block.

==== 2 December Fire ====
A fire razed Kuching High School on 2 December 2008 afternoon. The incident started at 1:05pm (GMT+8.00 HRS) when the staff noticed smoke billowing from the Red Crescent Society room at the ground floor of the Junior Science Laboratory and contacted the Civil Defence Department and the Fire and Rescue Services Department. At the same time, the office clerk, teachers and security guards at the site salvage important documents, some files and various equipments including heavy duty printers and computers from the administration block which houses historical documents, students' belongings and computers. The fire then spread to junior science laboratories above the building and administrative block adjacent to the Junior science laboratory block.

In about 40 minutes, the inferno was brought under control by forty-one firefighters with four fire engines and three Rapid Intervention Motorcycles (R.I.M) units from four Fire Departments in Batu Lintang, Tabuan Jaya, Petra Jaya and Padungan. Initial investigations revealed short circuit as the cause of the fire. Despite no casualty recorded, the school was faced with heavy material losses and ensuing financial problem to reconstruct the facilities. In addition to the two-storey Junior science laboratory block that includes junior science laboratories, equipment store room and staff wash room, as well as the adjacent two-storey administration block that includes principal room, staff room, administration room, library, meeting room for staff and students activities, which were burnt down in the blaze, textbooks kept in the Junior science laboratory block for the student's Textbook Loaning Scheme (Skim Pinjaman Buku Text or SPBT) the following school year were also destroyed. Also, the destroyed corporation's property within one of the burnt blocks summed up to a MYR 20,000 lost.

==== Aftermath ====
With the reason that classrooms used for the annual SPM examination, which was scheduled until 4 December 2008, were quite a distant from the burning blocks, the students sat for their exam as planned with no hindrance.

An immediate effort was called for to restore the burnt buildings along with those which had been declared unsafe by PWD preceding the calamity. The fire left the School Board of Management with an estimated MYR 6.4 million reconstruction cost. This included MYR 3 million for rebuilding the administration block and MYR 1.4 million for the Junior Science block, which were both razed by the fire, in addition to MYR 2 million for rebuilding Block 2 that consisted of living skills, religious teaching, and equipment storage rooms, which were falling down. To meet ends with its heavy cost, an appeal was made to the Ministry of Education for a grant.

On 23 December 2008, an emergency general meeting (EGM) held by the Teochew Association ordered the construction of a temporary administration office with MYR 200,000. Another MYR 3 million was funded by the meeting to rebuild Block 1 and the admin block for the long run. Also, the Kuching High Rebuilding Committee, chaired by Mr Kuek Eng Mong, was formed on 6 January 2009 with the support of ex-Highians (alumni), Parent-teacher association, Kuching High School Board of Management, Kuching Teochew Association and other concerned individuals. The school was also blessed with concerns from the state's Deputy Chief Minister Datuk Patinggi Tan Sri Dr George Chan Hong Nam, Malaysian Minister of Plantation Industries and Commodities Datuk Seri Peter Chin Fah Kui, Director of JKR Sarawak Datu Hubert Thian Chong Hui and other local politicians, who became advisors for the reconstruction of the school.

The school is slowly recovering from the calamity with fiscal support from various bodies and communities. Besides MYR 900,000 allocate by the School Board of Management and approximately half million ringgit from insurance claim, the reconstruction projects also received fundings from various bodies, including MYR 1.7 million from the Ministry of Education, MYR 200,000 from Sarawak's government MYR 600,000 from Kuching Teochew Association, MYR 100,000 from SUPP and MYR 120,000 from the school's Parent Teacher Association. Various fund-raising activities were also organised by the school and alumni. A jogathon organised by the school's parent-teacher association (PTA) on 25 July 2009 saw 400 participants and collected MYR 170,000 from the public.
