= Chinese High School =

Chinese High School may refer to:

== Educations ==
- Chinese Independent High School, Malaysia
- Chinese school
- Education in the People's Republic of China

== Schools ==
- Chinese High School (Batu Pahat), Malaysia
- Sabah Chinese High School, Tawau, Malaysia
- The Chinese High School (Singapore), Singapore
