= Kian Kok Middle School =

Kian Kok Middle School 亚庇建国中学 Yà Bì Jiàn Guó Zhōng Xué Sekolah Menengah Kian Kok
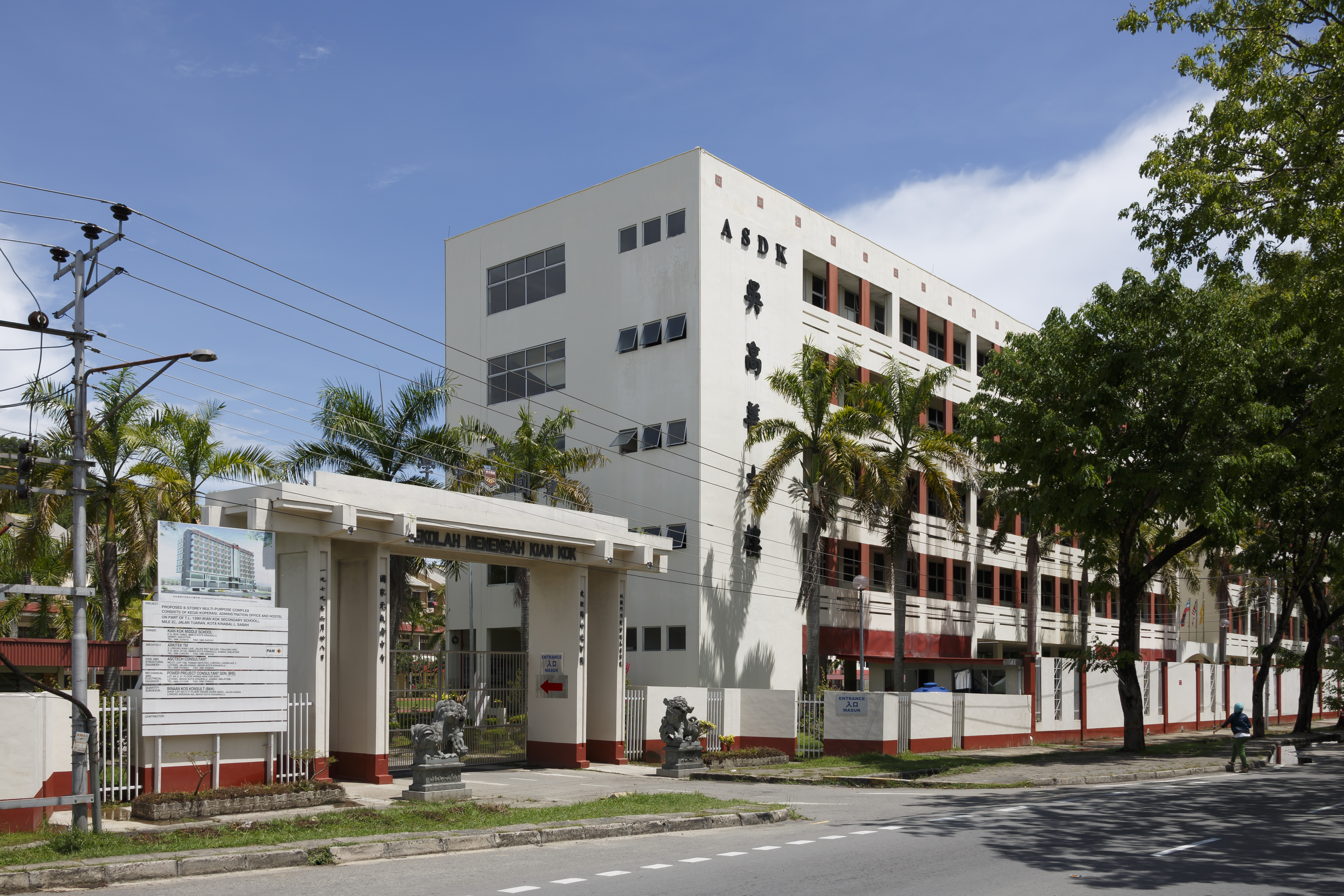

Location
- Kian Kok Middle School, Jalan Tuaran, 88450 Kota Kinabalu; Kota Kinabalu, Malaysia, Sabah, 88450; Malaysia

Information
- Type: Chinese Independent High School
- Motto: Chinese: 敬业乐群 (Diligent and Sociable)
- Established: 1963
- Chairman: Datuk Clement Yeh
- Principal: Goh Teck Seng
- Faculty: Science, Commerce, IGCSE and Culinary
- Gender: Coeducational
- Enrollment: 778 (2022)
- Senior UEC (2025) average: 94.64% (Passing rate)
- Website: www.kiankok.edu.my

Kian Kok Middle School (Sekolah Menengah Kian Kok in Malay, 亚庇建国中学 in Chinese) is a Chinese independent high school located in Kota Kinabalu, Sabah, Malaysia. The current principal is Goh Teck Seng (吴德成). The school offers both Malaysian public examination SPM, and Chinese independent high school examination, UEC.

== History ==
Kian Kok Middle School was founded in Kota Kinabalu during the early 1963. It was initially founded with the intention of accommodating junior high school students who failed to enroll into any public school. On 1 June 1963, the Hokkien association of Kota Kinabalu initiated the funding campaign for Kian Kok Middle School, with an initial donation of RM10,000 by the chairman. Within 9 months, the association has raised a total amount of approximately RM300,000.

During the early days of the school, there were only around 60 students and two classes. Students were forced to study in a temporary "campus" made up of several commercial offices that were leased by local businesses. The first building of Kian Kok Middle School was finally completely in January 1965. All 366 junior high school students enrolled in the school at that time were moved to the new permanent campus in Jalan Tuaran.

Kian Kok Middle School introduced their senior high school class in 1966. By 1968, the school was completed with four senior high school classes and eleven junior high school classes. It was considered as the standard size of a Malaysian high school at that time.
