= Sabah Tshung Tsin Secondary School =

Chinese school in Kota Kinabalu, Sabah, Malaysia

Sabah Tshung Tsin Secondary School Sekolah Menengah Tshung Tsin 沙巴崇正中学 Shābā Chóngzhèng Zhòngxué

Location
- 2 3/4 Jalan Dah Yeh Villa, Jalan Damai, Kota Kinabalu, Sabah, 88300; Malaysia; 5.9729°N 116.0944°E

Information
- School type: Chinese Independent High School
- Motto: Chinese: 止于至善 (Strive for Excellence)
- Established: 1965; 61 years ago
- Founder: Chong Fook Thien
- Chairman: Jimmy Yong Kyok Ming
- Principal: Dr. Chung Chin Hing
- Faculty: Pure Science, Mixed-Science, Pure Commerce, Arts & Commerce
- Teaching staff: 170 (2025)
- Grades: 3-3 System (3 years in Junior Secondary and 3 years in Senior Secondary)
- Gender: Coeducational
- Enrolment: 2600 pupils (2025)
- Classes: 52 classes (2025)
- Student to teacher ratio: 15.29
- Language: Mandarin, English and Malay
- Area: 9.26 acres (3.75 ha)
- Colors: Red; Yellow; Blue
- Yearbook: Tshung Tsin Graduation Magazine (Chinese: 崇正毕业刊)
- School fees: RM4,926 to RM5,574
- Affiliation: Kota Kinabalu Hakka Association
- Website: www2.sttss.edu.my

Sabah Tshung Tsin Secondary School (Sekolah Menengah Tshung Tsin Sabah in Malay; Chinese: 沙巴崇正中学; pinyin: Shābā chóngzhèng zhòng xué) is a Chinese independent high school located in Kota Kinabalu, Sabah, Malaysia. Established in 1965 by the Api-Api Hakka Association to address the educational needs of Chinese students in the region, the school has since become one of the sixty-three Chinese Independent High Schools in Malaysia. In 2007, the school was chosen as one of the ten Chinese Independent High Schools in Malaysia to be included as a Cluster School under the Education Blueprint of the Malaysian Government's Ninth Malaysia Plan.

Founded amidst educational reforms in 1962 that limited secondary school access, Sabah Tshung Tsin Secondary School aimed to provide opportunities for students unable to continue their studies. The school officially opened its doors on January 25, 1965, with an initial enrolment of 78 students, utilizing classrooms borrowed from Chung Hwa Chinese Primary School Karamunsing. Overcoming early challenges, including low enrolment, the school saw significant growth under new management, achieving a student body of over 670 by 1967. Despite governmental changes affecting enrolment policies, the school adapted and expanded its offerings, including classes for the Malaysian Education Certificate and Pre-university studies. Over the years, it has undergone numerous developments, including the construction of new buildings and facilities to enhance the educational experience. Until now, it is the school with the most students in Sabah, having an enrolment of 2600 pupils.

== History ==
=== 1962–1974: Early history ===
In 1962, the Malaysian government brought in legislation that only students who excelled in their Ujian Pencapaian Sekolah Rendah (Primary School Leaving Examination) and were under the age of thirteen were eligible for education in secondary school. As a result, at least 40-50% of students in the city were unable to further their studies, the majority of whom were Chinese. The Chinese community consequently opened Tshung Tsin school to solve this problem. It was founded by the Api-Api Hakka Association in 1965. Chong Fook Thien, then-President of the Hakka Association and one of the school's founders, proposed the construction of its building.

A committee was started with Pang Tet Chung as its chairperson. At the first meeting on 6 January 1965, the name "Sabah Tshung Tsin Secondary School" was decided. Soon afterward, the school was approved by the state's Education Department and 9.26 acres (37,500 m^{2}) of land was granted for its construction. The federal Financial Department approved the exemption of income tax to those who funded the school. On 12 October 1965, the school obtained the title deed for the land and the construction of the school commenced.

Sabah Tshung Tsin Secondary School opened on 25 January 1965, borrowing classrooms of Kota Kinabalu High School, Kota Kinabalu. 78 students were enrolled as the school's first students. The school was consequently accepted as a member of the Chinese Independent High School in Malaysia.

In 1967, the first permanent school building was opened by the then Chief Minister of Sabah, Tun Datu Mustapha. Around 670 students enrolled in the school. In 1968, the government implemented a higher graduation rate for primary school students whereby students can then easily enroll into public secondary schools. This significantly reduced the enrolment rate for independent schools throughout Malaysia. By 1974 there were only 24 students left in the school, and the school was at risk of being closed.

=== 1974–1989: Restructuring and Growth ===
The Api-Api Hakka Association decided to take action and had appointed a new management for the school. A new principal, Chang Yu On, was appointed in November 1974. Some professional Chinese teachers were also invited to teach in the school. The Hakka Association's efforts bore fruit in 1975 as the enrolment rate went up to 250 students for Junior One (初中一pinyin: Chūzhōng yī), with 60 students for Senior Four (高中一pinyin: Gāozhōng yī). Moreover, a two-storey hostel dedicated to the principal is launched in 1974.

In 1975, the school started classes for Senior 3 students, and for the first time participated in the Unified Examination Certificate (UEC) and government's Sijil Pelajaran Malaysia (SPM, Malaysian Education Certificate). Another 600 students were enrolled in the Junior section in 1976. Subsequently, the administrators decided to conduct an entrance examination to accept only the best students.

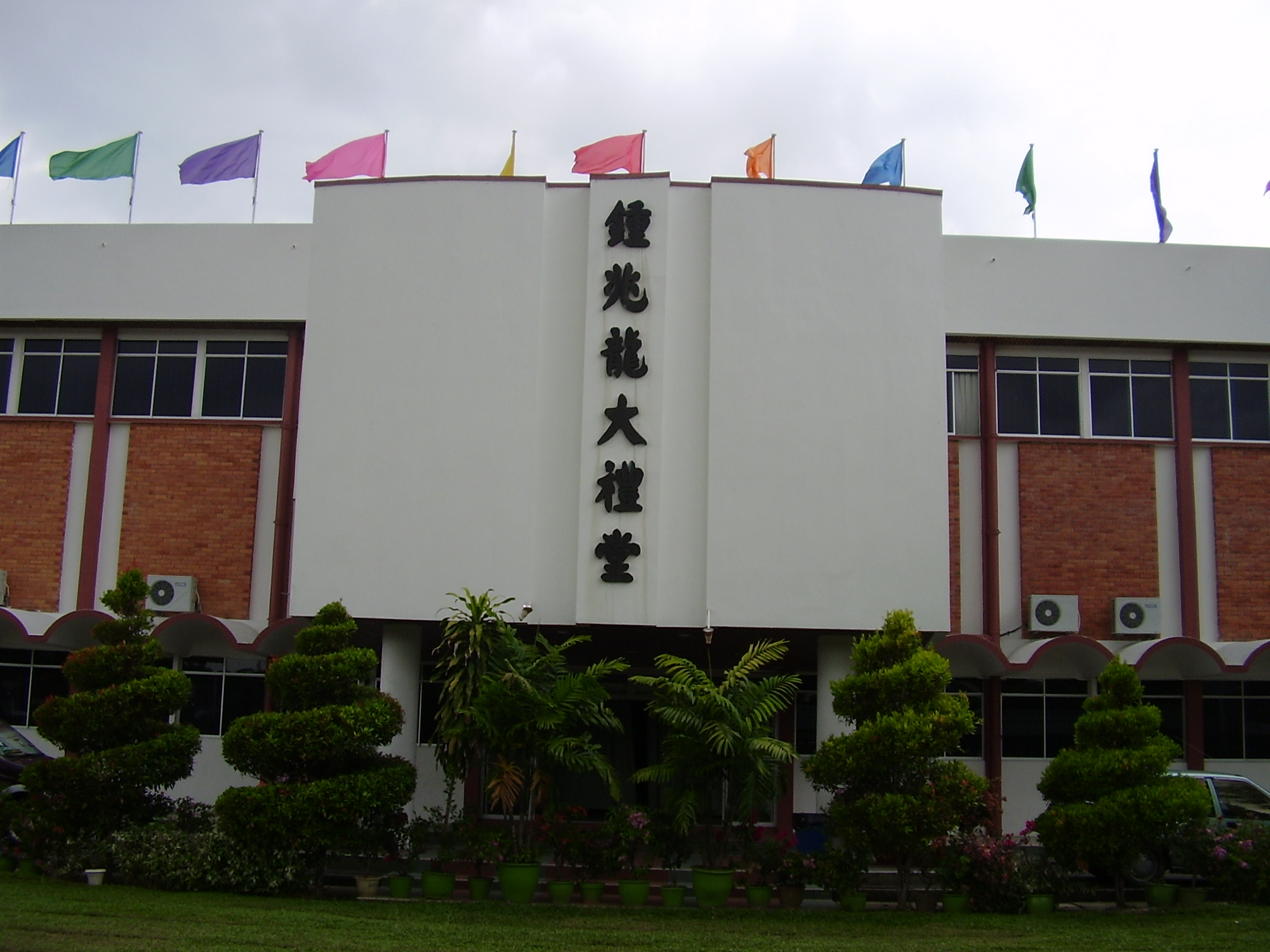
The hall in Tshung Tsin

The Hakka Association tried to implement improvements for the school, independent of the Government because of the discrimination against Chinese High Schools due to the New Economic Policy, an affirmative policy which was introduced by the Malaysian Federal Government in 1971 favouring the bumiputras. The school first built a hall with a capacity of around 2000 students along with the introduction of Tshung Tsin Night in November 1979. By the 1980s improvements had been made, and this included the construction of more school buildings. The new buildings included two permanent classroom buildings, a building for the school administrators, a garden inside the two new classroom buildings and the new school administrators building, a multi-purpose field, two basketball courts and a volleyball court.

On 19 August 1984, a new five-storey Multipurpose Building was opened, which once housed the school canteen and a computer lab on the first floor. The library is also located in this building from the second floor to the fourth floor. The fourth floor was used to provide accommodation for teachers for two years until a new teachers' hostel was opened in 1986, hence becoming the pre-university centre until 1989.

In 1984, as results for the students taking the Unified Examinations Certificate (UEC) were encouraging, the school decided to have classes for qualified students who were planning to further their studies in universities. A building was planned to be built in Menggatal, Sabah, but the school lost the land the new building was to be built on due to the defeat of the ruling party Barisan Nasional by the Parti Bersatu Sabah in the 1985 Sabah state election. In the end, the empty fifth floor of the five-story building was used for classes instead. Classes started in January 1987 with 152 students. The Pre-university class concept was well received and method of teaching was also lauded. In the same year, students who went for the A-Level and LCCI examinations organised by the University of Cambridge achieved good results, and this prompted the Hakka Association to raise funds to construct a building exclusively for the Pre-university students. In 1989, the building was opened by the then Chief Minister of Sabah, Pairin Kitingan. The Pre-university centre was known then as "Sabah Tshung Tsin Pre-University Centre" and today it is known as Institut Sinaran.

=== 1989–2015: Development ===
The school's principal Chang Yu On died on 4 November 1989 of a heart attack at age 48. In 1991, the Yang di-Pertua Negeri of Sabah, Mohammad Said Keruak bestowed the honorary title "Datuk" to Chang Yu On posthumously to honour his contributions to Chinese education in conjunction with his 66th birthday celebrations.

In 1996 Tsen Kui On became principal.

A seven-storey Co-curricular Activity Building was opened in December 1994 and is the first Co-curricular Activity Building that is built in Malaysia. The canteen was moved to this building from the original five-storey building, and two computer labs were added. The co-curricular activity offices were situated on the third floor. Music rooms, orchestral rehearsal facilities and photography studios were also placed in this building.

Due to the increase in enrolments, the Hakka Association proposed to build a new school campus in Menggatal. In 1997, the then Chief Minister of Sabah, Yong Teck Lee, approved a permit and a land title was received. Approximately 40 acres (160,000 m^{2}) of land was granted to the Hakka Association. The building planned is costly, and fund-raising is continuing. Phase 1 of the school's new campus is then completed in 2009.

The new area was originally set to be served as the school's new campus of STTSS starting from 2002, but was not approved and the plan was proved as a failure. Soon, the school changed its plans and decided to use the new area as the new school campus for Sabah Tshung Tsin Pre-University Centre, which its name was soon changed as Institut Sinaran. Institut Sinaran was then successfully moved to the new school campus in 2010. In 2005, the school forged sister school relationships with Lee Kau Yan Memorial School, Hong Kong and Donghwa High School, South Korea. The school also has forged relationships with secondary schools from foreign countries, such as Lee Kau Yan Memorial School & Yan Chai Hospital Wong Wah San Secondary School in Hong Kong.

The newly constructed student hostel

In 2008, Tsen Kui On retired as the principal of the school. As a result, Hiew Hoh Shin was appointed as Acting Principal, and in 2009, Principal.

In 2011, a sports court is built. The shade structure was added to provide protection from rain and harsh sunlight. The court is usually used as a venue for numerous basketball competitions. Moreover, basketball and volleyball training are usually done here.

In December 2013, the principal's hostel was removed in order to make way for a new five-storey student's hostel, which started its construction in January 2014.

=== 2015–present: Modernization ===
In 2015, the School Heritage Centre(校史馆 pinyin: Xiào shǐguǎn) was officially launched on 1 August 2015, and is located in the fourth floor of the Multipurpose Building.

View of the newly completed rubber running track and the football field

In April 2017, a Rubber Running Track around the school football field was completed, making future Sports Days' Running events better by providing extra traction.

Ground View of STTSS TreeCube

In the same year, the school announced its plan to build a new 3-storey building in the middle of the garden in between the two classroom buildings and the school administrators' building. The new building, named TreeCube, has a recreational area on the ground floor and individual lockers for students. The second, third and fourth floors are offices for teachers and the academic department, with the old staffrooms in the classrooms building becoming future classrooms for students. The building was completed by the end of 2017, just in time for the 2018 school year.

A plea to the government was also applied for the Junior 3 students to be able to take Mathematics and Science in English for the compulsory public PT3 examination, as Mathematics and Science are usually taken with Malay Language as the official language. In July 2017, the plea was approved, with Junior 3 students able to take Mathematics and Science in English for PT3 starting from 2019.

In 2022, a five-storey Technology Building was opened on 3 March 2022. This building includes five Science laboratories which is located at the right side of the building. In the left side of the building, special rooms such as the English Speaking Room, English Listening Room, Computer Labs, an office and more are located here. A year later, a mini theatre, which is located at the fourth floor of the building and is able to accommodate about 180 people, was completed on 6 January 2023. A new gym room for teachers and students are also opened on 11 November 2022.

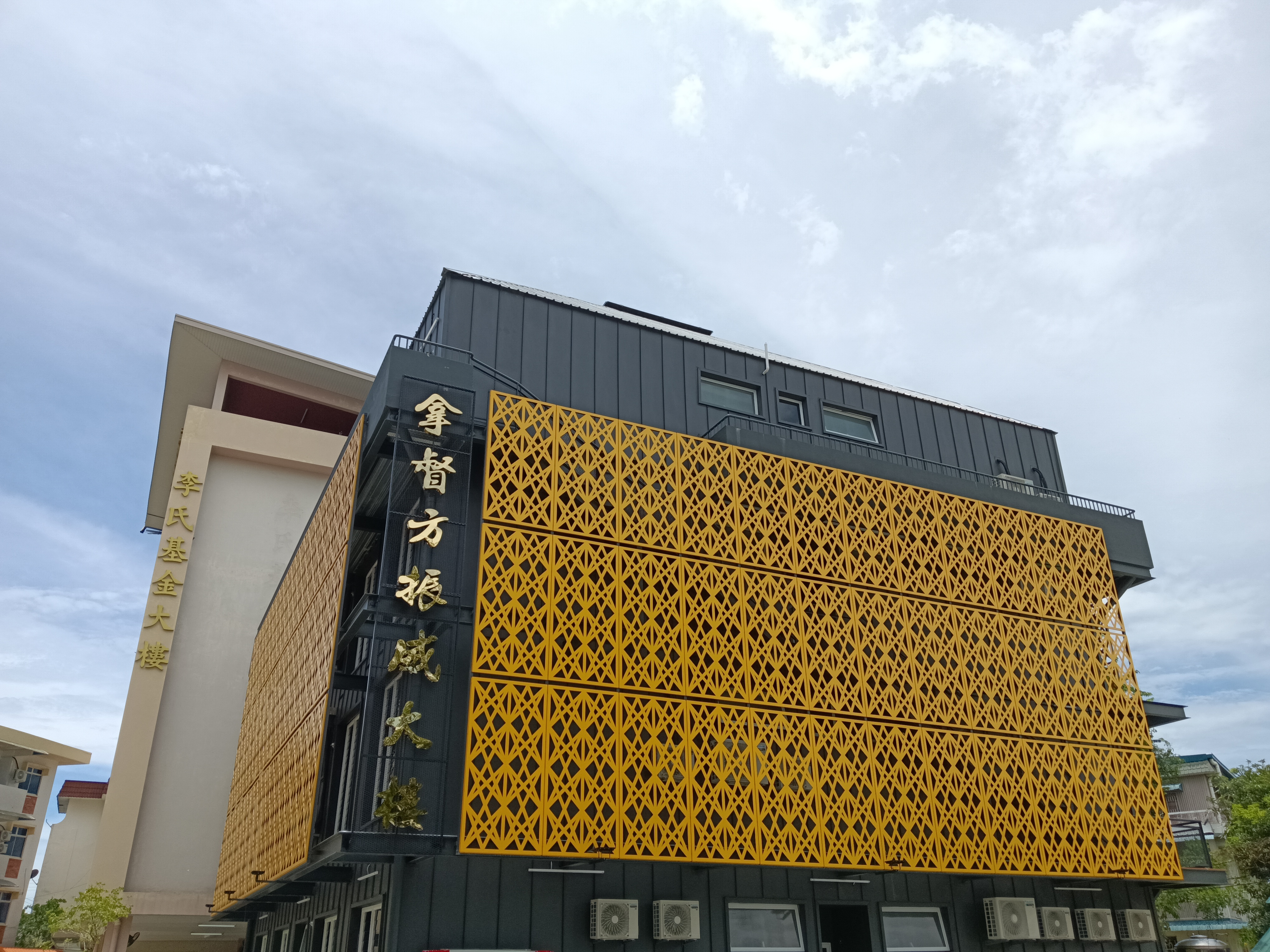
Front view of the current teachers' quarters

In 2023, four types of faculties are introduced to the Junior Three students and will take effect next year for all Senior One student. The following faculties are: Pure Science, Mixed-Science, Pure Commerce and Arts & Commerce.

Later that year, The plan to build a new four-storey teachers' quarters was announced. The new building will replace the two old teachers' quarters that was built in 1980 and 1986 respectively due to safety concerns. The building started construction on 25 November 2023, and was completed on 31 August 2025.

Since 2025, Tshung Tsin students who were from non-Chinese primary schools have to sit for Hanyu Shuiping Kaoshi (also known as Chinese Proficiency Test) to increase the students' language competitiveness.

== Administration ==
- Chairman: Jimmy Yong Kyok Ming (Since January 2001)
- Principal: Chung Chin Hing (Since October 2019)

=== List of former chairmen ===
1. Yap Ye Siu (1965–1974)
2. Pang Tet Chung (1975–1976)
3. Yong Zhi Feng (1977–1982)
4. Yong Jian Chong (1983–1986)
5. Fong Zhen Wei (1987–1996)
6. Chao De An (1997–2000)

=== List of former principals ===
1. Yap Ye Siu (1965–1967)
2. Chong Zhi Peng (1968–1969)
3. Tsen Fu Quan (1970–1971)
4. Chin Guan Shen (1972–1974)
5. Chang Yu On (1975–1989)
6. Lau Suan Hok (1990–1997)
7. Tsen Kui On (1997–2008)
8. Hiew Hoh Shin (2009–2019)
9. Chung Bao Wei (2019)

== Annual events ==
=== Tshung Tsin Night ===
Tshung Tsin Night (崇正之夜 pinyin: Chóngzhèng zhī yè) is an annual public concert that is solely organized by the Co-Curriculum Activities Department of the school since 1979. It is performed by multiple musical ensembles and dance troupes, such as STTSS String Ensemble, STTSS Sunflower Choir, STTSS Dance Troupe and more for two consecutive nights. In each concert, with a turnout of at least 3000 attendees over the two performance days, Tshung Tsin Night creates a lively atmosphere.

Each concert revolves around a theme. The theme for the latest Tshung Tsin Night concert is "如水至远" (pinyin: Rú shuǐ zhì yuǎn), which is originated from Chinese and can be defined as "Flowing far like water". This particular concert is part of the STTSS 60th Anniversary series, and through artistic performances, it vividly presents the 60-year history of the school.

=== Folk & Art Song Singing Competition ===
Folk & Art Song Singing Competition is an annual school competition that has been a tradition of the school since 1983. It is organised by the school's Sunflower Choir. It mainly focuses on the skill and immersion of singers who participated in the competition in order to decide the winner. Professional musicians around the nation would be invited to be the judges of the competition.

There are three main categories (exclude the separation of Junior section and senior section in each category): Male Solo Singing, Female Solo Singing and Choir. It involves the compulsory participation of each class in the choir category and optional participation of male and female representatives in the solo categories.

The first round of the competition is the two-day preliminary round. Five finalists from each solo category group and four classes from each choir category group are eligible to the next round, which is the final. Prior to the final, tickets will be sold to the public to be the spectator of the competition. The prize will then not only be given to each class and each solo singing representative in each group that advanced to the finals, which ranges from 4th Runner Up to the Champion. Special prizes are also given such as Overall Best Solo, Best Accompanist and Best Choir Conductor.

== Academics ==
=== Curriculum ===
Students usually spend six years in Tshung Tsin. The six years are divided into two stages: three years in junior middle and three years in senior middle. The curriculum consists mostly of six years of three languages (Chinese, Malay and English), mathematics, ICT and physical education.

Students in their junior year are required to take three years of science, history (in Malay and Chinese) and moral education. Introductory courses, notably art, guidance, humanities, STEAM and music, are also compulsory to be taken. Students in their first two years are required to take English oral lessons, which are split into Listening and Speaking respectively.

Students in the senior year are streamed into four faculties, which are Pure Science, Mixed-Science, Pure Commerce, and Arts & Commerce. All faculties consist of two years of history in Malay and Moral Education. Pure Science and Mixed-Science both offers three years of chemistry, additional maths and two years of moral education. Students in Pure Science are compulsory to take sciences courses which includes requisite biology, and physics classes while students in Mixed-Science may choose one of the science courses along with accounting. Students in Pure Commerce and Arts & Commerce both offers accounting and business studies. Students in Pure Commerce and Arts & Commerce are also required to take Economics and Arts, History in Chinese respectively.

=== Performance and awards ===
Tshung Tsin performs consistently above average in national examinations, with 42% of SPM entries, 67 Junior UEC entries and 17 Senior UEC entries achieving at least 4A's in 2024. The school also achieved a GPS of 4.10 for SPM public examination according to the 2024 result. Besides, among 440 Junior Unified Examinations Certificate (UEC) entries in 2024, 11 of them achieved 7A's, hence breaking the school record in the process.

Over the years, there are at least two students from the school who have won the Sabah State Excellent Scholarship Award in open category each year, with 6 students achieving this feat in 2025. Moreover, numerous students have also won scholarships given from different schools and companies such as the Shell Scholarship and the Petronas Scholarship.

== Campus ==
School gate of Tshung Tsin

Tshung Tsin's current campus covers 9.26 acres of land off Luyang. The campus was officially declared open by then Chief Minister of Sabah, Tun Datu Mustapha on 15 November 1967. The campus mainly consists of a seven-storey activity centre, a pavilion, a fully air-conditioned hall (兆龙堂 pinyin: Zhào lóng táng), an IT building, three hostels, three classroom blocks and a 3-storey office building (TreeCube).

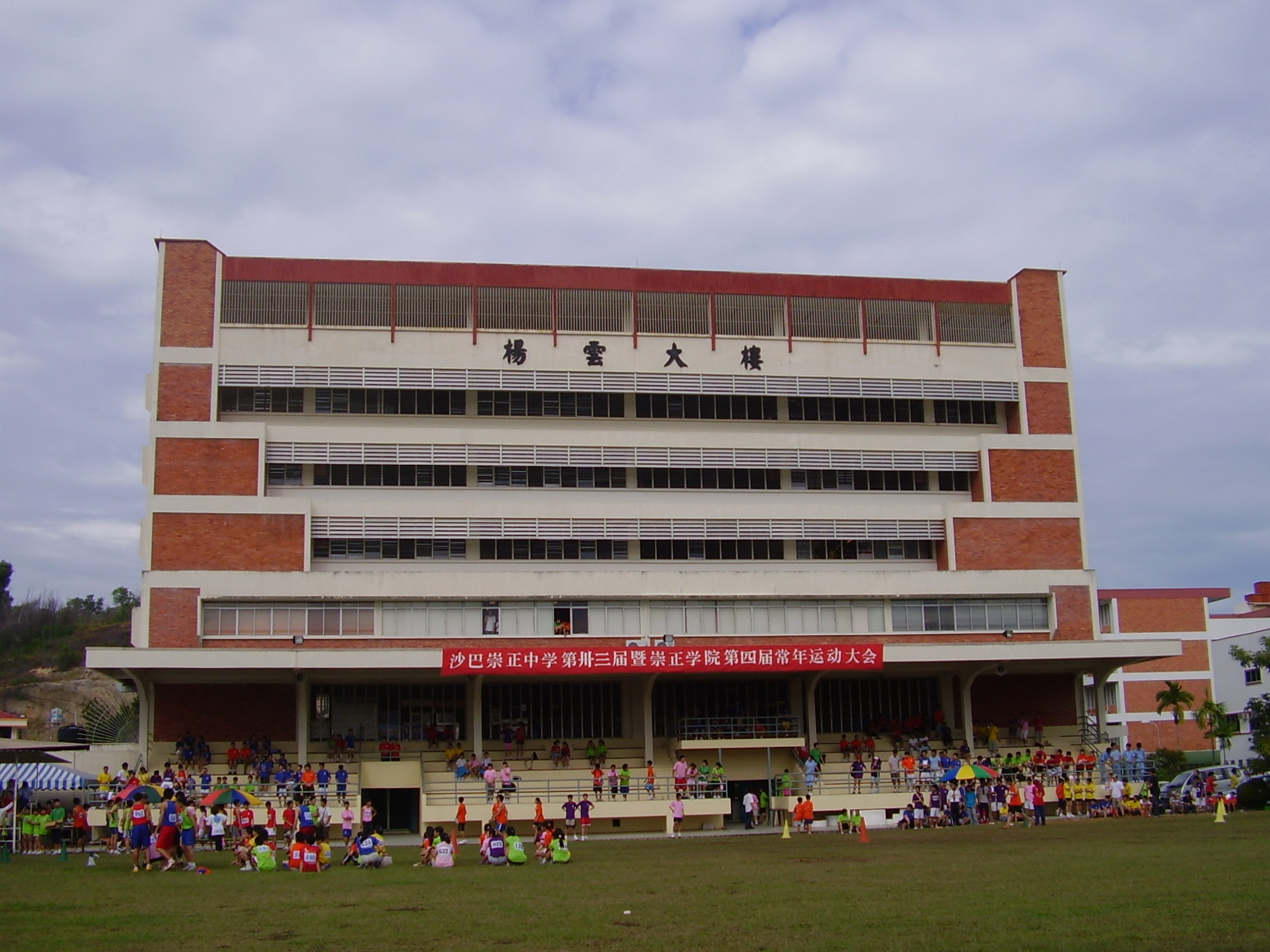
The activity centre. The School Sports Meet were being held here.

The hall opened in November 1979 and could accommodate around 2600 people. The air-conditioned hall is the common venue for weekly assemblies and dialogue sessions, as well as hosting competitions and concerts, notably Hua Luo Geng Mathematics Competition and Tshung Tsin Night. The IT building, opened on 30 March 2022 by Huazong President Goh Tian Chuan, houses science labs, English oral rooms, computer labs, workshops and a 180-seat auditorium. The auditorium is located at the fourth floor and is generally used for sharing talks, academic lectures and film forums.

Tshung Tsin Pavilion

The activity centre is the first of its kind in the country prior to its opening in December 1994. The building features 25 co-curricular activity rooms, a music room, a surau and the CCA office. The building also houses a canteen that can accommodate 2,300 people at a time.

TreeCube is a three-storey office space for teachers. The ground floor serves as a locker hub and a lobby for students. TreeCube also houses a social hub where exhibitions and talks are held.

Other facilities in Tshung Tsin include Yu On Court (Chinese: 佑安苑; pinyin: Yòu ān yuàn), named after one of the school's principal, late Chang Yu On, three pavilions, notably Tshung Tsin Pavilion, a triply-storey air conditioned library, a gymnasium room and a running & track field.

== International relations ==
=== Sabah Tshung Tsin Education Fair ===
Sabah Tshung Tsin Secondary School organizes the annual Sabah Tshung Tsin Education Fair, which is open to the public. More than 50 local and international universities participate each year, representing countries such as China, Australia, the United Kingdom, and the United States. The fair provides students with opportunities to explore higher education options, meet university representatives, and learn about admission requirements.

=== Bilateral cooperation agreements ===
==== Mainland China ====
In 2024, Sabah Tshung Tsin Secondary School co-organized the China Higher Education Fair, involving 16 Chinese colleges. While in 2025, the school forged sister school relationships with Heyuan High School. The school maintains ties with Beijing Institute of Technology and has signed a cooperation agreement to serve as a base high school for its overseas students. The school also has international links with Tsinghua University, Fudan University, East China University of Science and Technology, Shanghai University of Finance and Economics and Tongji University.

==== Taiwan ====
Sabah Tshung Tsin Secondary School signed a cooperation agreement with National University of Kaohsiung, which provides scholarships to eligible graduates interested in pursuing studies at the university. The school also has international links with Taiwanese universities such as University of Taipei, National Taiwan University, National Dong Hwa University and more.

=== Academic exchanges and tours ===
The school organises education tours each year, with recently being Shanghai Education Tour, Taiwan Education Tour and Guangdong Education Tour, which enables Senior 3 students to visit university departments, attend lectures, and participate in cultural exchanges with local secondary schools and sister schools.

== Notable alumni ==
=== Political and business figures ===
- Phoong Jin Zhe: Sabah's current Minister of Industrial Development and Entrepreneurship, chief of the Democratic Action Party (DAP) Socialist Youth and member of Sabah State Legislative Assembly of Luyang.
- Teo Chee Kang: Former president of Liberal Democratic Party (LDP) of Malaysia and member of Sabah State Legislative Assembly of Tanjong Kapor.

== See also ==
- Education in Malaysia
- List of schools in Malaysia
- Chinese independent high school
