= Stulang Laut Ferry Terminal =

Ferry terminal in Johor Bahru, Johor, Malaysia

Coordinates: 1°28′15.7″N 103°46′59.1″E

Stulang Laut Ferry Terminal Berjaya Waterfront Ferry Terminal

General information
- Type: International ferry terminal
- Location: Stulang, Johor, Malaysia
- Owner: Berjaya Corporation

Stulang Laut Ferry Terminal (also known as Berjaya Waterfront Ferry Terminal), is a ferry terminal located in Stulang in Johor Bahru. It was renamed Berjaya Waterfront Ferry Terminal in 2013 when Berjaya Group bought over the property. However, local media still refers to it as Stulang Laut Ferry Terminal as of 2019.
