= Institut Sinaran =

Malaysian university in Sabah

Coordinates: 6.036747°N 116.146887°E

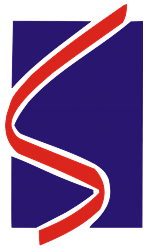
- Established: 1987
- Affiliations: Tshung Hwa Enterprise Sdn. Bhd.
- Location: KM 10, Jalan Tuaran Bypass, 88450, Kota Kinabalu, Sabah, Malaysia
- Website: www.institut-sinaran.edu.my

'Institut Sinaran' is an institute of higher education located in Kota Kinabalu, Sabah, Malaysia. It was founded in 1987 as Sabah Tshung Tsin Pre-University Centre to provide affordable, internationally recognized pre-university qualifications locally.

The campus was first situated at Sabah Tshung Tsin Secondary School along Jalan Damai. It was upgraded to an institute on 14 July 2002.

On 4 January 2010, Institut Sinaran moved from where it began into a new campus, which is located at KM 10 between Jalan Tuaran Bypass and Jalan Sulaman, situated on the education hub close to several schools and University Malaysia Sabah (UMS).

Institut Sinaran is currently the largest Cambridge GCE A-Level Centre in East Malaysia and have produced more than 10,000 graduates.

== History ==
Institut Sinaran was first established as Sabah Tshung Tsin Pre-University Centre in 1987 at Sabah Tshung Tsin Secondary School. It was later upgraded from a Centre into an institute on 14 July 2002 launched by Datuk Chong Kah Kiat, 13th Chief Minister of Sabah.

In 2006, Institut Sinaran started their own Diploma in Commerce which has been fully accredited by the Malaysian Qualifications Agency (MQA), with credit transfer to many universities locally and abroad for direct entry into 2nd year of business related degree programme.

2008 was another milestone forward as Institut Sinaran were approved to be the first South Australian Matriculation (SAM) centre in East Malaysia. The combination of school based assessments for assignments and the external exams, provide a more holistic approach to assess students' abilities and to prepare them well for rigorous studies in university.

On 4 January 2010, Institut Sinaran moved from where it began into a new campus which located at KM 10 between Jalan Tuaran Bypass and Jalan Sulaman, situated near University Malaysia Sabah (UMS) and 1Borneo Hypermall in Kota Kinabalu. The old campus was situated at Sabah Tshung Tsin Secondary School along Jalan Damai.

Institut Sinaran partnered with Taylor's University and launched the Taylor's University Foundation in Science Programme on 24 January 2015 and the first intake started in March 2015.

== Educational Structure ==
Institut Sinaran offers five main courses of study, which are Cambridge GCE A-Level (Science and Commerce), Diploma in Commerce, Diploma in Accounting, Diploma in Marketing and ACCA Strategic Professional Modular Delivery.

The institute used to offer the South Australian Matriculation programme and Taylor's University Foundation in Science.

However, the programmes are inactive as Institut Sinaran aims to expand its business vertically by offering more tertiary and professional programmes.

School hours in the institution are from Monday to Friday, 8 a.m. to 4 p.m. excluding public holidays while administration staff are required to work from 8 a.m. to 12 p.m. on Saturday. Institut Sinaran offers scholarships and other financial assistance such as PTPTN.
