= Foon Yew High School =

High school in Johor, Malaysia

- 宽柔中学; Sekolah Menengah Foon Yew
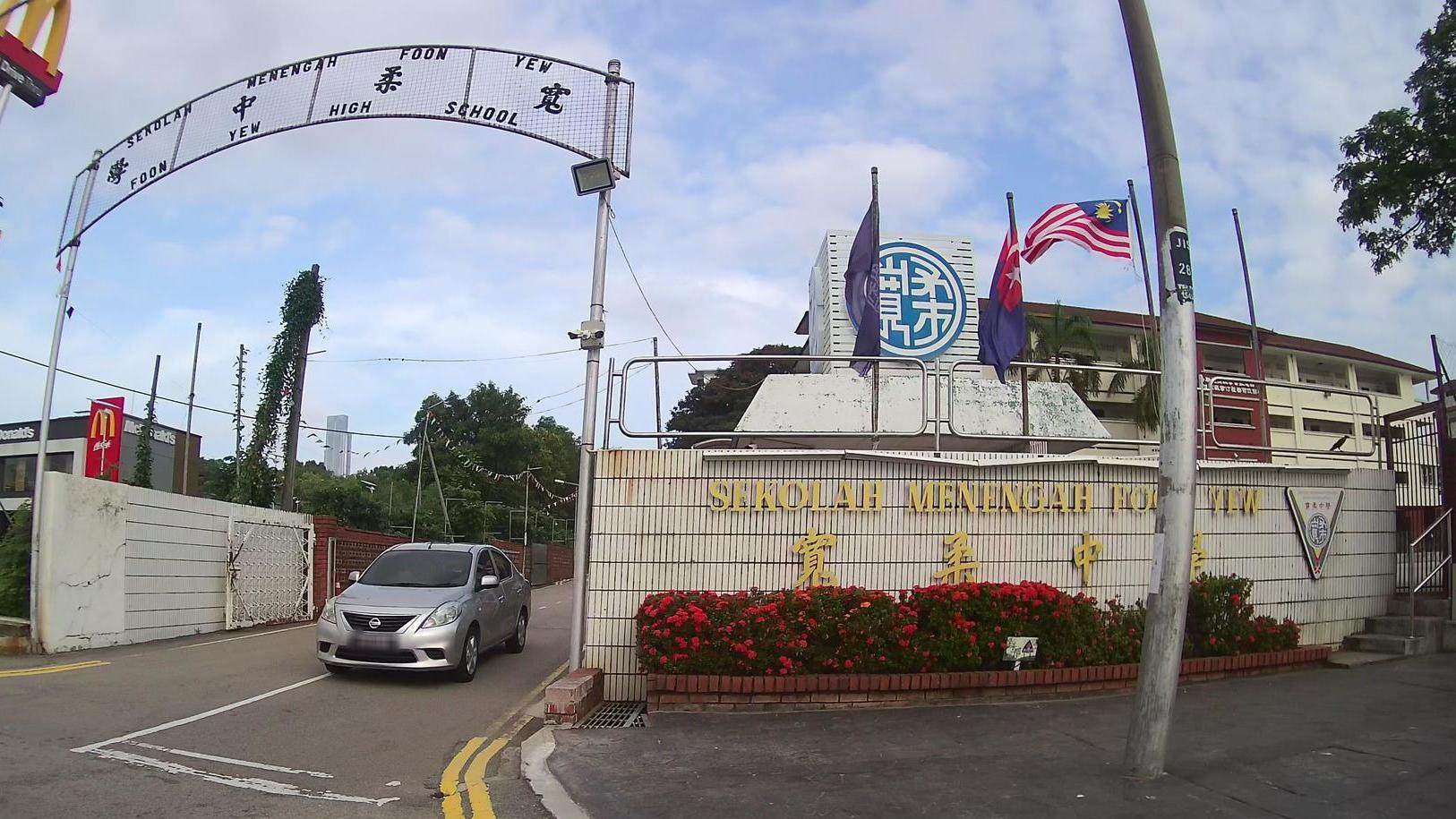

Location
- Johor Bahru and Kulai, Johor; Malaysia; 1.46881°N 103.77875°E

Information
- Type: Chinese independent high school
- Motto: 宽柔以教，不报无道 (Teach with kindness and leniency, and do not retaliate against injustice)
- Established: 18 May 1913
- Chairman: Zheng Zhenxian (郑振贤)
- Principal: Chua Zhen Xiong
- Website: www.foonyew.edu.my

Foon Yew High School
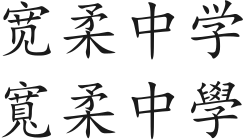
- Foon Yew High School in Simplified Chinese (top) and Traditional Chinese (below) character

Chinese name
- Simplified Chinese: 宽柔中学
- Traditional Chinese: 寬柔中學
Transcriptions
Standard Mandarin
- Hanyu Pinyin: Kuānróu Zhōngxué
Yue: Cantonese
- Jyutping: Fun^{1}jau^{4} Zung^{1}hok^{6}

Malay name
- Malay: Sekolah Menengah Foon Yew

Foon Yew High School (Chinese: 宽柔中学, Malay: Sekolah Menengah Foon Yew) is the largest Chinese independent high school in Malaysia. The school has three campuses, one in Stulang Laut, another in Kulai, and a recent third in Masai. Foon Yew High School has two semesters each year. An academic year begins in January and finishes at the end of November, with a near two-week holiday in June.

== Introduction ==
The main school is located in Stulang Laut, Johor Bahru. The school's Kulai branch is in Taman Indahpura, Kulai, and another branch in Masai is in Bandar Seri Alam, Masai.

== History ==
On 18 May 1913, Foon Yew Chinese Primary School was founded by Wong Hee Chor (Chinese: 黄羲初; pinyin: huang xī chū), Luo Yusheng (Chinese: 骆雨生; pinyin: luo yǔ shēng), Zheng Yaji (Chinese: 郑亚吉; pinyin: zheng yǎ ji), and Chen Yingxiang (Chinese: 陈迎祥; pinyin: chen ying xiang). During World War II, the school suffered heavy damage and was forced to close down. After the war, the school was re-constructed by Shi Liandui (Chinese: 史联对; pinyin: shǐ lian dui).

In 1951, the school decided to extend the Chinese education and established Foon Yew High School. In 1963, the number of students enrolled reached 1500. In 1980, the school implemented an entrance examination for new students. There were over 4000 students in the school at the time.

In 2005, the school's Kulai branch officially opened. In 2015, Foon Yew High School-Kulai celebrated the school's 10th anniversary. The number of enrolled students in both high schools reached 12000. In 2021, the school's second branch in Bandar Seri Alam, Masai officially opened.

== Notable alumni ==
- Penny Tai - a popular singer and songwriter in the Mandopop music arena
- Chew Sin Huey - a singer, the first runner-up in the female category of Project SuperStar 2005
- Dr. Boo Cheng Hau - a Johor state assemblyman of the political party DAP. Won in the Skudai zone of the 12th Malaysia General Election over fellow Foon Yew Alumni
- Quek See Ling - a poet, writer, Chinese ink painter and editor.

== See also ==
- Education in Malaysia
