= Confucian Private Secondary School =

Chinese Independent High School in Malaysia

- 尊孔独立中学

Location
- Kuala Lumpur; Malaysia; 3.144525°N 101.699202°E

Information
- Former names: Confucian School
- Type: Chinese Independent High School
- Motto: 勤 朴 勇 毅 (Diligence, Simplicity, Bravery, Resoluteness)
- Established: Founded 1906
- Principal: Goh Ben Peng (吴明槟)
- Colors: Red, Black, Sky Blue and White
- Website: www.confucian.edu.my

Confucian Private Secondary School
- "Confucian Private Secondary School" in Simplified (top) and Traditional (bottom) Chinese characters
- Traditional Chinese: 尊孔獨立中學
- Simplified Chinese: 尊孔独立中学
Transcriptions
Standard Mandarin
- Hanyu Pinyin: Zūnkǒng Dúlì Zhōngxué
- Bopomofo: ㄗㄨㄣ ㄎㄨㄥˇㄉㄨˊㄌㄧˋㄓㄨㄥ ㄒㄩㄝˊ
Yue: Cantonese
- Jyutping: Zyun^{1} Hung^{2} Duk^{6} Lap^{6} Zung^{1} Hok^{6}

Confucian Private Secondary School (CPSS; Chinese: 尊孔独立中学; pinyin: Zūnkǒng Dúlì Zhōngxué) is a co-educational Chinese Independent High School located in Kuala Lumpur, Malaysia. It's one of the oldest Chinese Independent High School in Malaysia.

The school was founded in 1906 during British rule. Following the educational philosophy of Confucius, the thinker from the State of Lu, the institution upholds core principles of "respect and care (尊重关爱), education for all without discrimination (有教无类), holistic development (全面发展), and teaching in accordance with individual aptitude (因材施教)." It defines its general mission as "cultivating well-rounded character and developing human resources," and its special mission as "preserving the national language and passing on Chinese culture."

== History ==
=== Pioneering stage (1906-1912) ===
- 1906 - Loke Yew led the Overseas Chinese including Cheong Yoke Choy and established Confucian School.
- 1907 - Class officially started on 24 May, with 73 students in total.
- 1908 - Kuen Cheng Girls' School established, Zhong Zhuojing was both Confucian and Kuen Cheng's principal.

=== Turbulent Times (1913-1926) ===
- 1916 - Song Mulin became the principal and bought a land to build the new educational block.
- 1921 - The "School Registration Ordinance" was accepted by the board of directors, caused many dissatisfactions.
- 1924 - The Junior Middle department established.

=== Developing stage (1926-1942) ===
- 1934 - Huang Guangrao became the principal and the school was improving once again.
- 1935 - The Senior Middle department established.
- 1939 - Cantonese–Hokkien split occurred in the board of directors, the Hokkien faction established Chong Hwa Independent High School in Kuala Lumpur.

=== Japanese occupation (1942-1945) ===
- 1942 - The Japanese invaded, school stopped due to the building was occupied by the Japanese.

=== Recovery period (1946-1948) ===
- 1946 - The Japanese surrendered, school recoveries was carried out by Lim Lian Geok.
- 1948 - Impacted by the "Emergency Ordinance", left-wing teachers and students was faded out of the school.

=== Flourishing period (1949-1961) ===
- 1955 - Became the largest school in central Malaya, with 3800 students in total.
- 1958 - Confucian Primary school and Secondary school's administrations were separated.

== Notable alumni ==
- Ong Tee Keat

== Connectivity ==
- 200m from AG8 SP8 Plaza Rakyat LRT station.
- 200m from KG17 Merdeka MRT station.
- 700m from KG16 Pasar Seni MRT station.
- 750m from KJ14 Pasar Seni LRT station.
