= Quek See Ling =

Singaporean poet and writer (born 1986)

Quek See Ling (simplified Chinese: 郭诗玲; traditional Chinese: 郭詩玲; pinyin: Guō Shīlíng; born in October 1986 in Johor Bahru, Johor, Malaysia) is a Singaporean poet, writer, Chinese ink painter, independent publisher, editor, instructor of Chinese creative writing.

== Education ==
After graduating from Foon Yew Primary School 2 and Foon Yew High School in Johor Bahru, Malaysia, she obtained Bachelor of Arts in Chinese (minor in Translation) and Master of Arts degrees in Chinese from Nanyang Technological University. Her research papers on Chinese Linguistics were published in Soochew University and National Taiwan University. She obtained Certificate of Chinese Painting with Grade A (Distinction) of Nanyang Academy of Fine Arts in 2018.

== Career ==
She had been working as an academic editor and tutor of Division of Chinese in Nanyang Technological University, and she was also an invited instructor of Chinese Creative Writing in secondary school. Her poems were recommended by renowned Taiwanese poet Hung Hung 鸿鸿 as "taking the nutrient of life directly, without any burden" ("没有包袱地从生活中摘取活生生的养分"). Renowned Hong Kong writer Dung Kai-cheung recommended her poems "has Zhuangzi-style and she provides the new definition of the poem world"("有庄子之风，移风易俗，定义诗的新境界"). Her Chinese paintings were recommended by renowned Singaporean artist Chua Poh Leng as "very literate, bold and fearless with a sense of humour and joy, and put her audiences in a smile" ("立意大胆带幽默，笔墨磅礴，甚有文气，看了令人会心一笑"). She was invited as one of the five International Poets (国际诗人) in 2019 Taipei Poetry Festival （2019台北诗歌节）.

== Award / selected works ==
=== Creative Award (Poetry/Painting) ===
- 2016：21 published poems were selected by Taiwan Poetry Magazine《卫生纸》(Toilet Paper, edited by Hung Hung 鸿鸿), issue 31 & 33.
- 2018：10 poems were selected by Shanghai Literature Magazine《外国文艺》(Foreign Literature, published by Shanghai Yiwen Publishing 上海译文出版社), issue 5 (October).
- 2019：Poetry "三等老人"（Old People with Three Types of Waiting）, 陈大为、钟怡雯主编《华文文学百年选.马华卷2：小说、新诗》(Chen Da-Wei & Choong Yee Voon eds., Selected Hundred-Year Chinese Literary Works - Malaysian Chinese Issue: Novel & Poetry), Taipei: 九歌出版社 (Chiu-Ko Publishing), 2019, pp.395-396.
- 2020: Chinese Painting "Distanced But Not Apart (停见不停爱) was selected by the "#SGArtforHCW" Exhibition Project (co-organised by National Gallery Singapore and Singapore Medical Association)

=== Editor Award ===
- 2017：Booklist of Lianhe Zaobao 2016 (《致读者：新加坡书店故事1881-2016》[Passage of Time: Singapore Bookstore Stories 1881-2016], one of the five contributors and editors)
- 2020：Booklist of Lianhe Zaobao 2019 (《马来散记（新编注本）》《狮城散记（新编注本）》[Lu Po-Yeh's Malayan Sketches and Singaporean Sketches (Newly Edited and Annotated), Executive editor, one of the two annotators, and one of the three reviewers) ]

== Works ==
=== Research Essay Collection ===
- Using Fewer Straws for This Little Planet (Yi Li Di Qiu, Shao Yong Shui Cao): A Study on Chinese Language and Sinophone Literature in Singapore and Malaysia (《一粒地球，少用水草：新马华语研究与文学评析》) (Taipei: Wan Juan Lou Books Company Limited，2023) ISBN 978-986-47-8990-0

=== Poetry Collections ===
- Walking Me on Me (《我走在我之上》) (Singapore: Self-Publishing，2014) ISBN 978-981-09-1287-1
- Bulletproof, Yet How Could We Embrace (《穿着防弹衣的我们怎么拥抱》) (Singapore: Self-Publishing, 2015) ISBN 978-981-09-4045-4
- When Your Muse Is Stuck in Traffic (《当你灵感塞车》) (Singapore: Self-Publishing, 2016) ISBN 978-981-09-8872-2
- Gaining While Losing (《得不到你时得到你》) (Written and Illustrated by Quek See Ling) (Singapore: Self-Publishing, 2017) ISBN 978-981-11-2387-0
- Meat Up with You (《肉与肉的相遇》) (Written and Illustrated by Quek See Ling) (Singapore: Self-Publishing, 2019) ISBN 978-981-14-0376-7
- To the Lovely Grey (《致美好的灰色》) (Written and Illustrated by Quek See Ling) (Singapore: Self-Publishing, Mar 2020) ISBN 978-981-14-4631-3
- Promised Not To Stir (《说好不搅拌》) (Written and Illustrated by Quek See Ling) (Singapore: Self-Publishing, Aug 2020) ISBN 978-981-14-6370-9
- The Edge of L (《L的棱角》) (Written and Illustrated by Quek See Ling) (Singapore: Self-Publishing, Apr 2023) ISBN 978-981-18-6360-8
- The Absurdism of the Absurdity (《比谬》) (Written and Illustrated by Quek See Ling) (Singapore: Self-Publishing, Nov 2023) ISBN 978-981-18-8438-2

=== Co-authored Historical Books ===
- 《致读者：新加坡书店故事1881-2016》(Singapore: Chou Sing Chu Foundation, 2016) ISBN 978-981-09-8944-6
- Passage of Time: Singapore Bookstore Stories 1881-2016 (Singapore: Chou Sing Chu Foundation, 2016) ISBN 978-981-09-8945-3
- Chou Sing Chu, Founder of POPULAR: Portrait of a Book Industry Titan (Bilingual Book, Chinese Title: 百年书业话星衢：大众书局创办人周星衢纪事) (Singapore: Chou Sing Chu Foundation, 2019) ISBN 978-981-14-3887-5

=== Painting Collection ===
- Untamed Heart: Chinese Paintings by Quek See Ling (《野生的心：郭诗玲水墨画集》) (Painted & Edited by Quek See Ling) (Singapore: Self-Publishing, 2018) ISBN 978-981-11-7249-6

=== Edited Book ===
《拉长的影子：新加坡与外国作家写作理由32札》（Elongated Shadows: 32 Passages By Writers from Singapore and Beyond on Their Reasons for Writing （Singapore: Self-Publishing, 2021）ISBN 978-981-14-8141-3

=== Annotated Books ===
- 鲁白野著，周星衢基金编注《马来散记（新编注本）》 (Lu Po-Yeh's Malayan Sketches [Newly Edited and Annotated], Executive editor, one of the two annotators, and one of the three reviewers) (Singapore: Chou Sing Chu Foundation, 2019) ISBN 978-981-14-0901-1
- 鲁白野著，周星衢基金编注《狮城散记（新编注本）》 (Lu Po-Yeh's Singaporean Sketches [Newly Edited and Annotated], Executive editor, one of the two annotators, and one of the three reviewers) (Singapore: Chou Sing Chu Foundation, 2019) ISBN 978-981-14-0902-8
- 邝国祥著，周星衢基金编注《槟城散记（新编注本）》 (Kwong Kwot Seong's Penang Sketches [Newly Edited and Annotated], Executive editor, one of the four annotators and reviewers) (Singapore: Chou Sing Chu Foundation, 2023) ISBN 978-981-18-7905-0

=== Written Children's Storybooks ===
(Pen Name: Super Egg Tart )

- I Love to Learn 5 (《我爱学习5》) (Story & Text: Quek See Ling; Illustration: Ren Hua-bin) (Singapore: Chou Sing Chu Foundation, 2019) ISBN 978-981-14-0899-1
- I Love Legends 5 (《我爱经典5》) (Editor: Quek See Ling; Illustrator: Ikkoku) (Singapore: Chou Sing Chu Foundation, 2019) ISBN 978-981-14-0897-7
- I Love Life 6 (《我爱生活6》) (Story & Text: Quek See Ling; Illustration: Ikkoku) (Singapore: Chou Sing Chu Foundation, 2021) ISBN 978-981-18-2917-8
- I Love Legends 6 (《我爱经典6》) (Editor: Quek See Ling; Illustrator: Xiao Bi) (Singapore: Chou Sing Chu Foundation, 2021) ISBN 978-981-18-2914-7
- Little Curry Puff: The Mysterious Tissue Paper (《辣弟阿角：神秘的纸巾》) (Story & Text: Quek See Ling; Illustrator: Yue Ye Tao) (Singapore: Chou Sing Chu Foundation, 2022) ISBN 978-981-18-4233-7
