= Stulang =

Suburb in Johor Bahru, Johor, Malaysia

Coordinates: 1°28′07.5″N 103°46′34.2″E

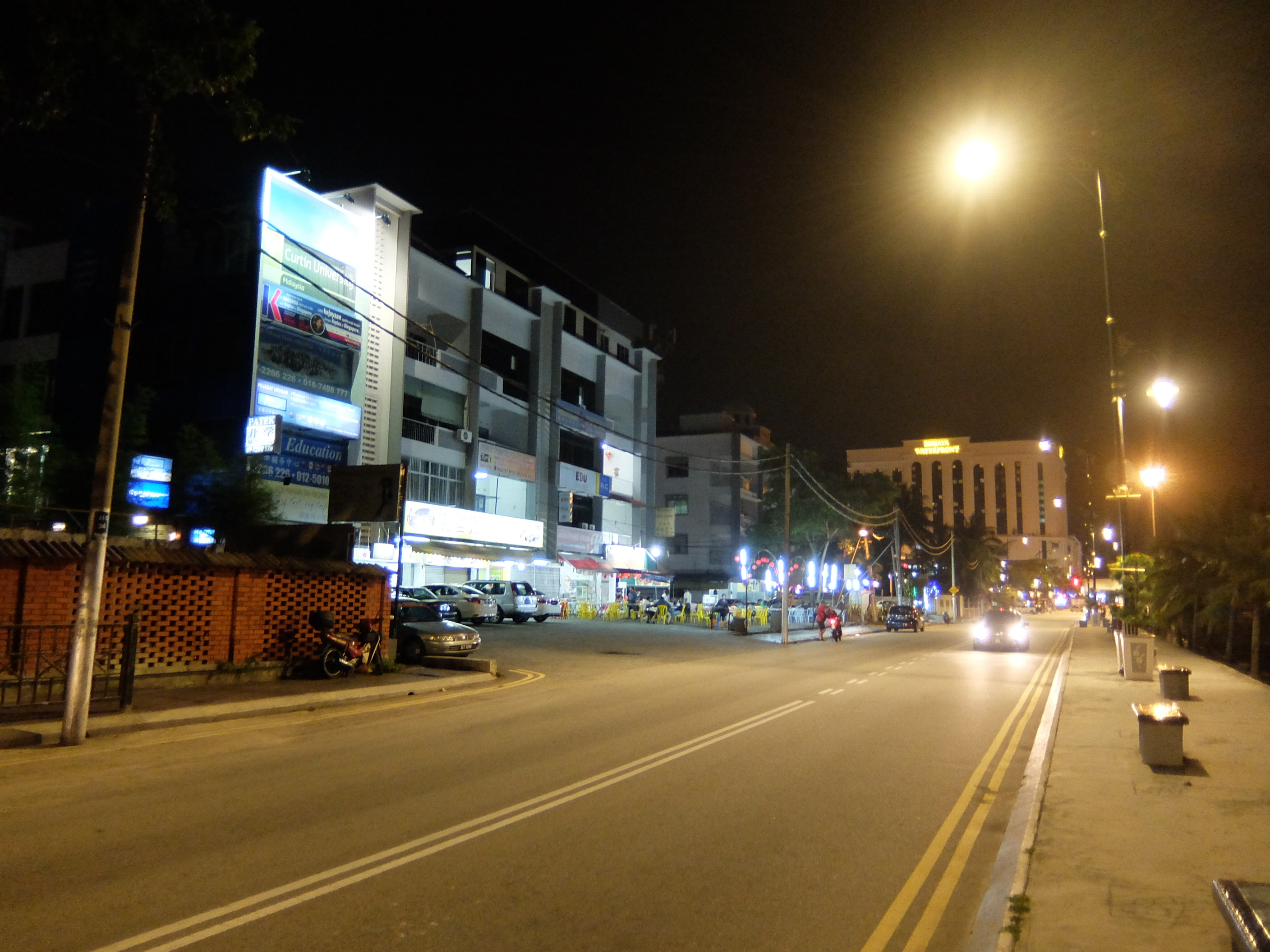
Stulang

Stulang (Jawi: ستولڠ; Chinese: 士都兰) is a suburb in Johor Bahru, Johor, Malaysia. It is divided by two main roads, which are Jalan Stulang Darat and Jalan Stulang Laut. Previously it was a small fishing village facing toward Johor Straits. Nowadays, it is full of flats (housing), and the largest Chinese Independent High School (Foon Yew High School) in Malaysia.

Zheng Ann Old Temple is a more than eighty years old temple in the area.

The royal place of Johor Sultan, Pasir Pelangi, is also located here.

== Demographics ==
Ethnic composition of Stulang (2020)
| Ethnicities / Nationality | Percentage |
| Malay | 43% |
| Chinese | 51.5% |
| Indians | 4.6% |
| Others | 0.9% |

Most of Stulang's residents are of Chinese descent (51.5%), followed by Malays (43%) and Indians (4.6%).

== Transportation ==
The area is accessible by Muafakat Bus route P-102.
