= Chung Hua Middle School No. 1 =

- 古晋中华第一中学

Location
- Jalan Peace; Kuching, Sarawak, Malaysia; Kuching, Sarawak, 93450
- Coordinates: 1.546991°N 110.377181°E

Information
- School type: Chinese Independent High School
- Opened: 1958
- School number: +60 82-331 599
- Principal: Lee Chee Beng (李志鹏)
- Enrolment: 1670 (2013)
- Average class size: 40
- Language: English, Chinese, and Malay
- Hours in school day: 7
- Website: www.chms1.edu.my

Chung Hua Middle School No. 1 (Chinese: 古晋中华第一中学; Malay: Sekolah Menengah Persendirian Chung Hua) is a Chinese Independent High School located in Kuching, Sarawak, Malaysia. The school was established in 1958. It is the oldest surviving Chinese Independent School in Sarawak and is also one of the 60 Chinese Independent High Schools in Malaysia.

As of 2013, the school has a total of 1670 students.

== Awards ==
- 2015 Raffles Design Competition - Second Runner Up
