= Sabah Chinese High School =

- 斗湖巴華中學
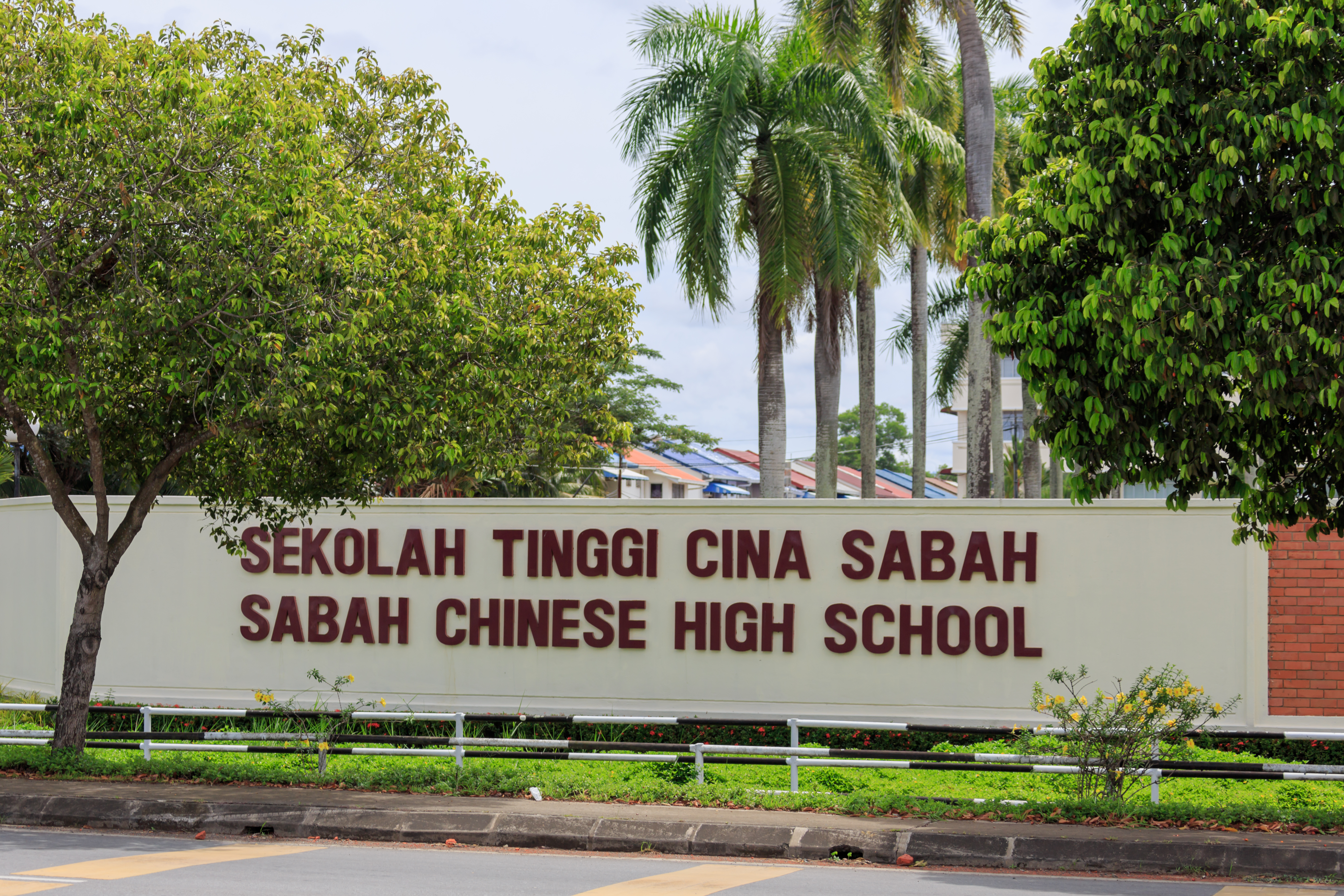

Location
- TB2813, Jalan Chong Thien Vun; Tawau, Sabah, 91000; Malaysia
- Coordinates: 4.261815°N 117.911549°E

Information
- Type: Chinese Independent High School
- Language: Chinese

The Sabah Chinese High School (Chinese: 斗湖巴華中學) is a high school in Tawau, Sabah, Malaysia.

== See also ==
- Education in Malaysia
