= Chinese independent high school =

Type of private school in Malaysia

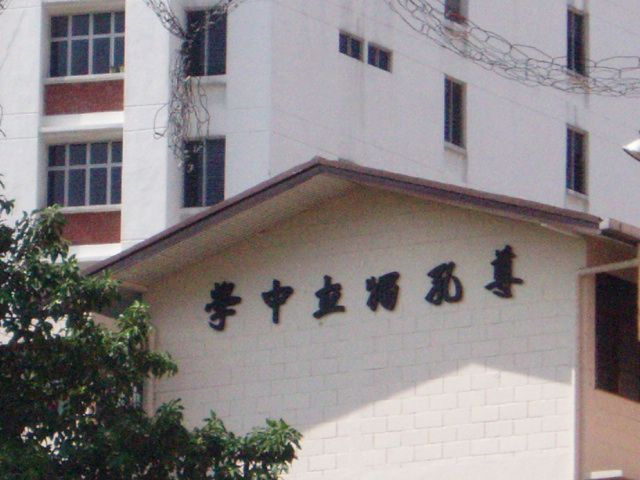
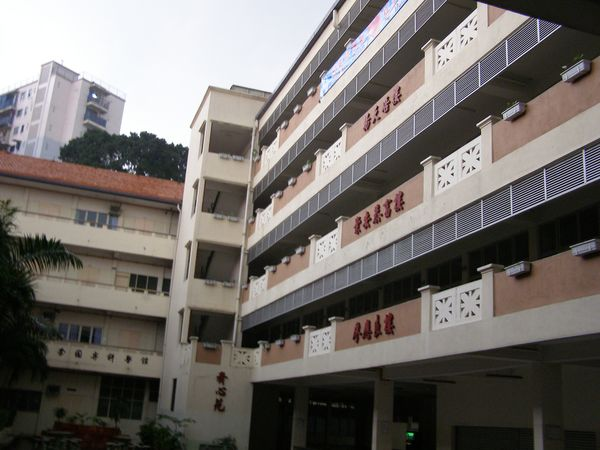
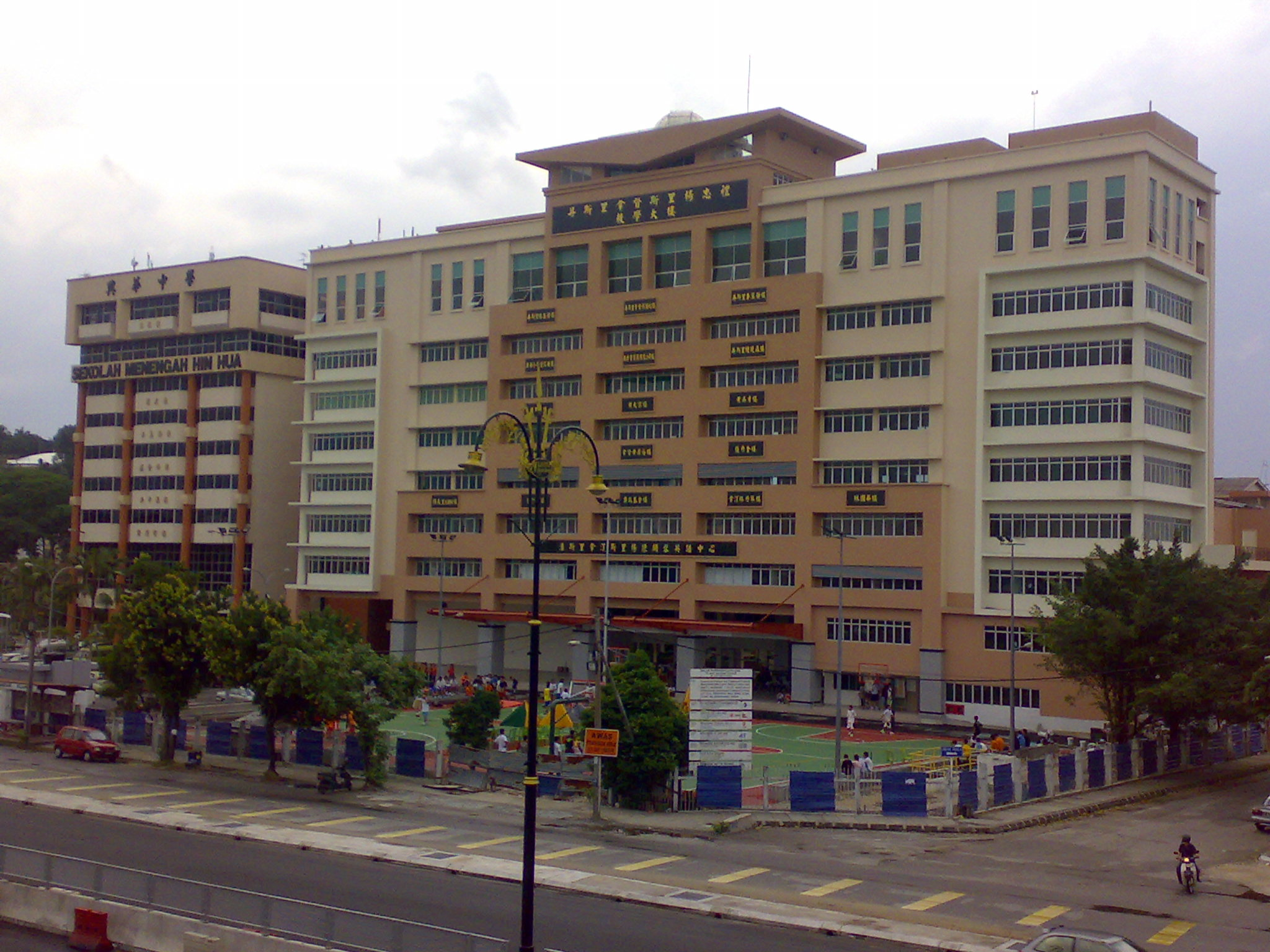
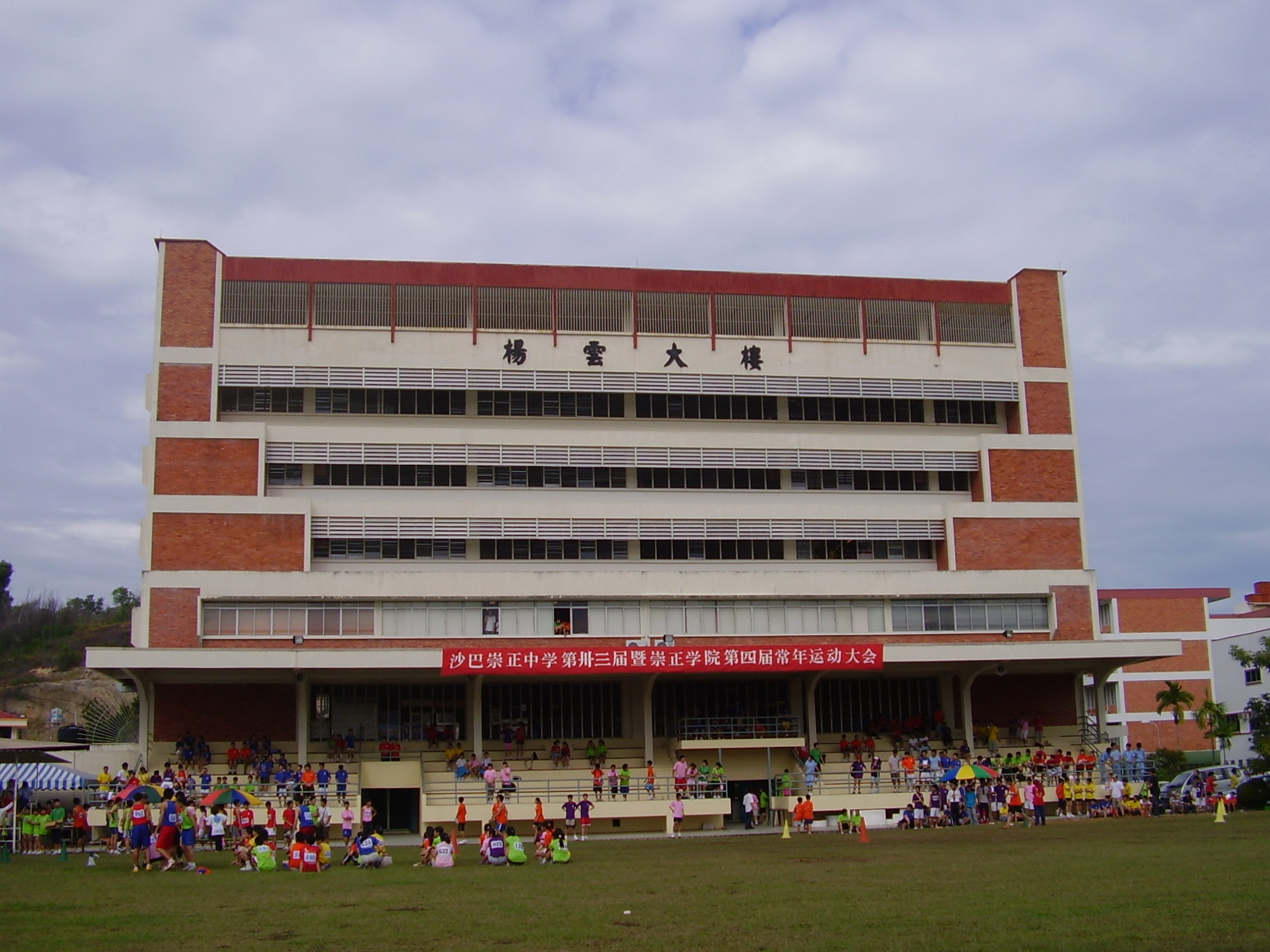
From clockwise: Tsun Jin High School in the federal territory of Kuala Lumpur, Tshung Tsin Secondary School in Kota Kinabalu of Sabah, Hin Hua High School in Klang of Selangor, and Confucian Private Secondary School (尊孔獨立中學) (Note: Pinyin: Zūn Kǒng Dúlì Zhōngxué.) in Chinatown, Kuala Lumpur, some of the Chinese independent high schools within Malaysia

A Chinese independent high school (simplified Chinese: 华文独立中学; traditional Chinese: 華文獨立中學; pinyin: Huáwén Dúlì Zhōngxué) is a type of private high school in Malaysia. They provide secondary education in the Chinese language as the continuation of the public primary education in Chinese national-type primary schools or SJK(C). The main medium of instruction in these schools is Mandarin Chinese using simplified Chinese characters. The United Chinese School Committees Association of Malaysia (UCSCAM), (Note: The association of Chinese school trustees, simplified Chinese: 马来西亚华校董事联合会总会; traditional Chinese: 馬來西亞華校董事聯合會總會; pinyin: Mǎláixīyà Huá Xiào Dǒngshì Liánhé Huì Zǒng Huì.) also known as the Dong Zong (董总; 董總; Dǒng Zǒng), coordinates the curriculum used in the schools and organises the Unified Examination Certificate (UEC) standardised test. Despite this, the schools are independent of each other and are free to manage their own affairs.

Chinese independent high schools represent a small number of high schools in Malaysia. The number of Chinese independent high schools differed among sources, ranging from 60 to 63, due to the ambiguous status of SM Chong Hwa Kuantan and whether branch campuses count as separate schools. In 2020, UCSCAM adopted the "60+2+1" formula in describing the number of Chinese independent high schools:

- 60 Chinese independent high schools originated from the aftermath of school conversions in the 1960s
- 2 branch campuses of Foon Yew High School (Kulai branch and Bandar Seri Alam branch)
- 1 private school allowed to participate in the UEC examinations (SM Chong Hwa Kuantan)

Being private schools, Chinese independent high schools do not receive consistent funding from the Malaysian federal government, although they did receive some funding from some state governments such as Johor, Penang, Sabah, Sarawak, and Selangor as well as in the 2019 and 2020 budgets under the Pakatan Harapan federal government. However, in accordance with their aim of providing affordable education to all in the Chinese language, their school fees are substantially lower than those of most other private schools. The schools are kept alive almost exclusively by donations from the public. Until 2017, there is a total of around 60 Chinese independent high schools around Malaysia. (Note: Due to limited facilities, especially classrooms and land area, despite increasing demands and also popularity among Bumiputera parents, their requests for expansion were restricted by the federal government of Malaysia with their numbers remain and limited at 60 schools.) Throughout the country's formation, a total of 104 Chinese independent high schools had disappeared due to conversion into either English or Malay-medium (SMJK or SMJK(C)) high schools. Despite struggles with national Bumiputera policy, Malaysia was the only country within Southeast Asia that successfully developed a Chinese-medium education system outside the Sinosphere territories of Mainland China, Hong Kong, and Taiwan.

== Background and early foundation history ==
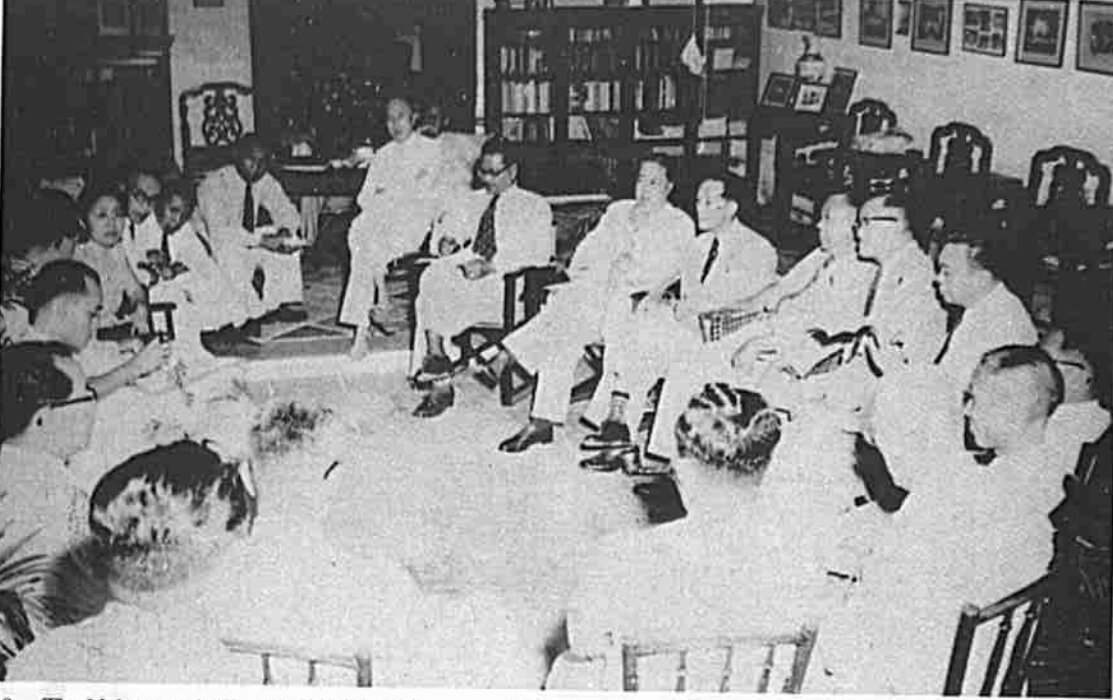
The Malacca meeting regarding Chinese education in Malaya (Tun Tan Cheng Lock and Tunku Abdul Rahman can be seen in the centre), January 1955

Chinese Independent High School
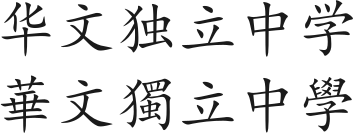
- Chinese Independent High School in Simplified Chinese (top) and Traditional Chinese character (below)
- Traditional Chinese: 華文獨立中學
- Simplified Chinese: 华文独立中学
Transcriptions
Standard Mandarin
- Hanyu Pinyin: Huáwén Dúlì Zhōngxué
Yue: Cantonese
- Jyutping: waa^{4} man^{4} duk^{6} lap^{6} zung^{1} hok^{6}
Southern Min
- Hokkien POJ: Hôa-bûn To̍k-li̍p Tiong-ha̍k

The history of Chinese independent education in Malaysia dates back to the conclusion of British Malaya and Borneo in the early 19th century, founded by the Chinese settlers since the 18th century to provide education in their mother tongue dialects and languages. Through the British-administered system, the independent schools also survive the push made by British administrators for them to convert into English-medium schools. The establishment of the Federation of Malaya in 1948 prompted multiple proposals for educational policies aimed at unifying the diverse ethnic communities within the federation, culminating in the Barnes Report and the Fenn-Wu Report in 1951; the first proposes the instruction of both English and Malay in national schools, whereas the second endorses a more permissive stance on the matters. Following the Razak Report and subsequent Malaya independence in 1957, the federal government instructed all independent schools to surrender their properties and be assimilated into the National School system to bring together the children of various races under one system with the use of Malay language as the main medium of instruction. This subsequently caused a strong objection among the Chinese community over the policy where their schools would instead become "National Type" schools, which contradicts their interests, as they believe that their culture and education are unseparated and closely intertwined and their ethnic language education is their "last bastion" in preserving both their ethnic and national identities within the federation.

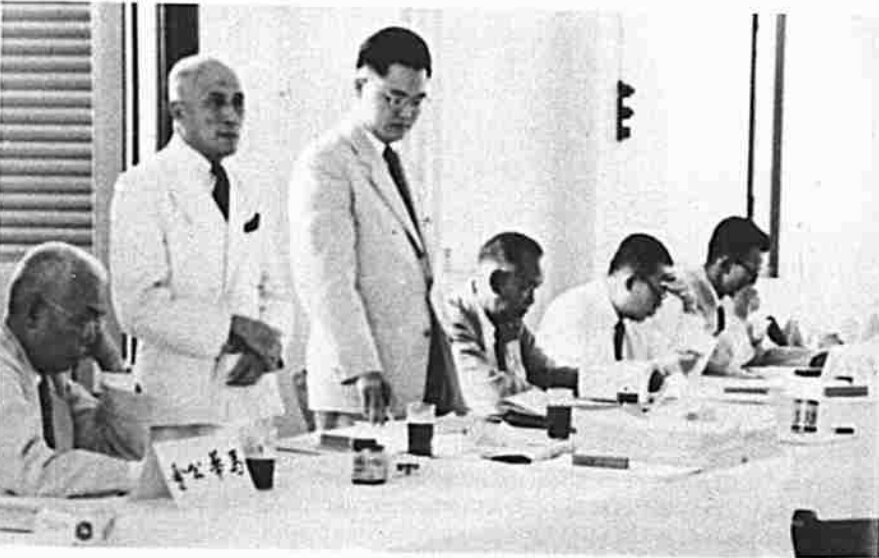
Tun Tan Cheng Lock (standing left) together with Wen Tien Kuang (right) speaking at the 1952 meeting of teachers, school managers, and leaders of the Malaysian Chinese Association (MCA)

Despite the objections, more than half of the Chinese independent high schools at the time complied with the national policy to convert into English-medium schools due to financial constraints, with only a few remaining until 1962. Based on the plan of the National Educational Policy, the federal government will be in charge of the school curriculum and teaching personnel while the lands still belong to the schools; although if they required further full assistance from the federal government, the independent high schools needed to surrender their land titles to the government, where their status would be changed to fully-aided schools (SMJK). While Chinese primary schools were allowed to retain Chinese as the medium of instruction, Chinese secondary schools are required to change into English-medium schools. This plan was viewed as an unacceptable compromise amongst some Chinese, and a minority of the Chinese schools refused the proposal and became private high schools or Chinese independent high schools as they were later called. This concept slowly gained popularity and, during the 1960s and 70s, many of the National Type high schools reopened their independent high school branch. Their numbers continued to grow until a period when the political situation in Malaysia made it impossible to set up additional independent Chinese high schools. Despite the 1969 events affecting the interrelations between Chinese and Malay, a surge of enrolment in Chinese independent schools followed by the Revival Movement in 1973 as a response to post-1969 escalating policies favouring Malay-medium education towards English-medium schools, further prompting numerous English-educated parents to enrol their children in Chinese independent schools in large numbers. The rising population of Bumiputera students in Chinese independent high schools, totalling approximately 100,000, exacerbates the classroom shortage coupled with problems caused by the federal government policy restrictions.

Currently there are 63 independent Chinese high schools across Malaysia in both West and East, including Foon Yew High School, which is the largest secondary school in the country with over 10,000 students. Foon Yew High School was the first school to refuse the government's proposal, as well as the first high school to have two branch campuses (located in Kulai and Bandar Seri Alam). The second largest is Chong Hwa Independent High School, Kuala Lumpur, which is known for its excellent academic performance as well as award-winning performance in inter-school competitions. Over 60 schools converted to become National Type schools, including famous schools like Chung Ling High School, Penang Chinese Girls' High School on Penang Island, Jit Sin High School in Seberang Perai part of Penang as well as Ave Maria Convent High School and Sam Tet High School in Ipoh, Perak. While the medium language for most subjects is switched to English as according to the proposal, the teaching and learning of Mandarin remained compulsory in these schools, with most of them dedicating at least one seventh to one fifth of their teaching time per week to Mandarin studies. Since the 1970s, Chinese independent high schools have been part of Malaysian education systems.

=== West Malaysia ===
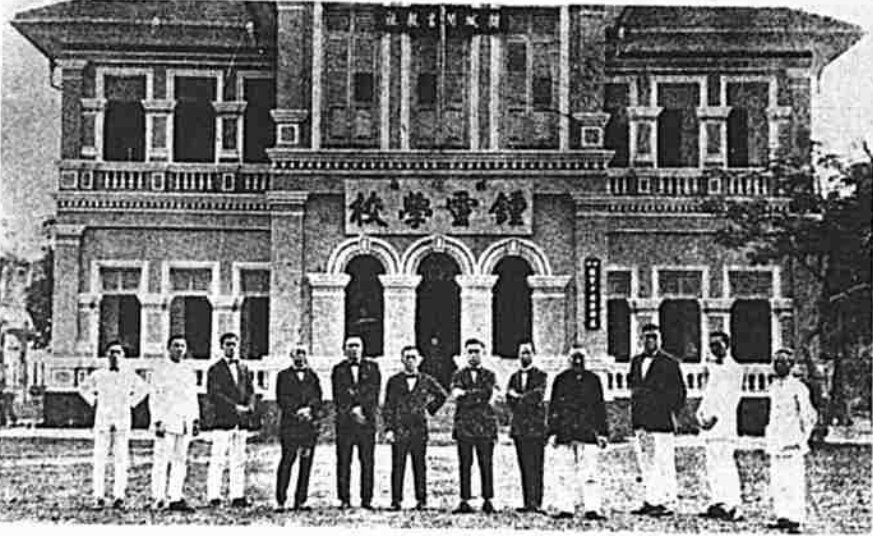
Chung Ling High School, in 1935. The school has since been converted into a national-type SMJK school.

Chinese independent high schools in West Malaysia were founded during the British colonial period by local Chinese communities, with some of the earliest institutions, such as the Confucian Private Secondary School (CPSS) in 1906, located in the capital, Kuala Lumpur. Other schools including the Foon Yew High School (1913) in Johor Bahru, Pay Fong High School (1913) in Malacca, Chung Hwa School (1913) in Seremban, Shun Jen School (1914) in Kuala Lumpur, and Chung Ling High School (1917) in Penang. The 1911 Revolution (Xinhai Revolution) indirectly promoted a strong requirement over the importance of education, leading to the rapid development of Chinese independent schools during this era. The schools were, however, halting their operations throughout the Japanese occupation in 1941 and subsequent British Military Administration (BMA) in 1945 before resuming in the post-war period. In 1951, the United Chinese School Teachers' Association of Malaya (simplified Chinese: 教总; traditional Chinese: 教總; pinyin: Jiào Zǒng) was established. Another committee was formed in the year of 1954 to oversee Chinese education, named the United Chinese School Committees' Association of Malaya (simplified Chinese: 董总; traditional Chinese: 董總; pinyin: Dǒng Zǒng). The two closely worked together on the development of Chinese education and to protect their interests within the Federation of Malaya.

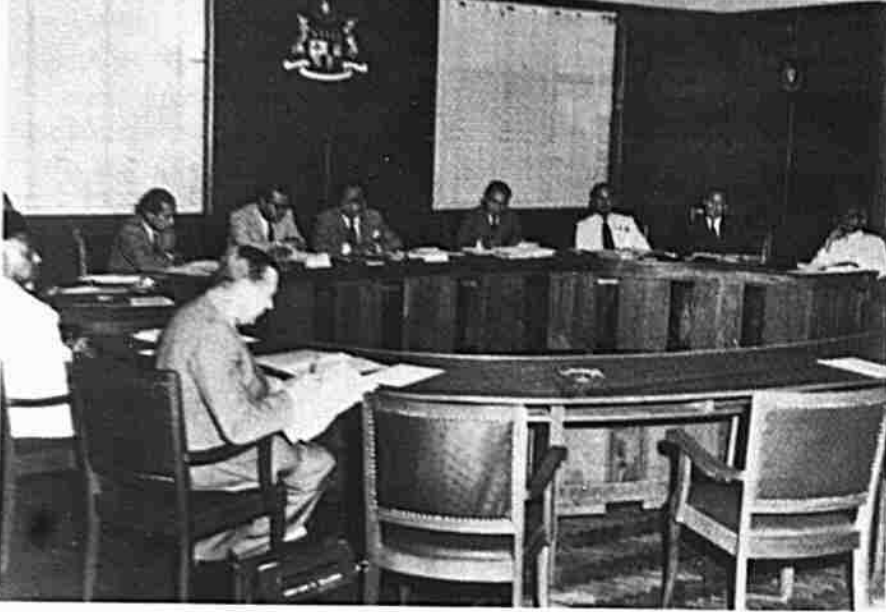
First meeting of the Razak Committee in the Federation of Malaya regarding the education within the federation, 30 September 1955

Throughout the Malayan Emergency period, many rural Chinese residents who were located within conflict areas were relocated into new villages where their schools had to be rebuilt and start in new locations to separate them from the influence of the communists. A special scheme for aid was provided by the federal government of Malaya, which is available for the first two years after their resettlement into the village, with the British colonial authorities' policy towards Chinese schools beginning to change after the release of the Fenn-Wu Report. In 1961, the Chinese independent high school managements were given the option of either being absorbed into the national language system and receiving financial aid from the federal government in exchange for switching their medium of instruction in line with the federal policy. Due to financial constraints facing by many of the schools, around 54 Chinese independent high schools from the total of 71 in the Federation of Malaya accepted the offer with their medium of instruction changed to English and subsequently became known as SMJK. The remaining 17 maintained their independent position and became the present remaining Chinese high schools. The escalating demands and financial limitations to enhance facilities, coupled with a lack of federal support, are leading to the closure of certain schools due to a decrease in student enrolment. Through subsequent internal reforms in management, seminars, and contributions from Chinese educational leaders, independent schools have effectively maintained the Chinese language as their primary medium of instruction, despite facing challenges.

=== East Malaysia ===
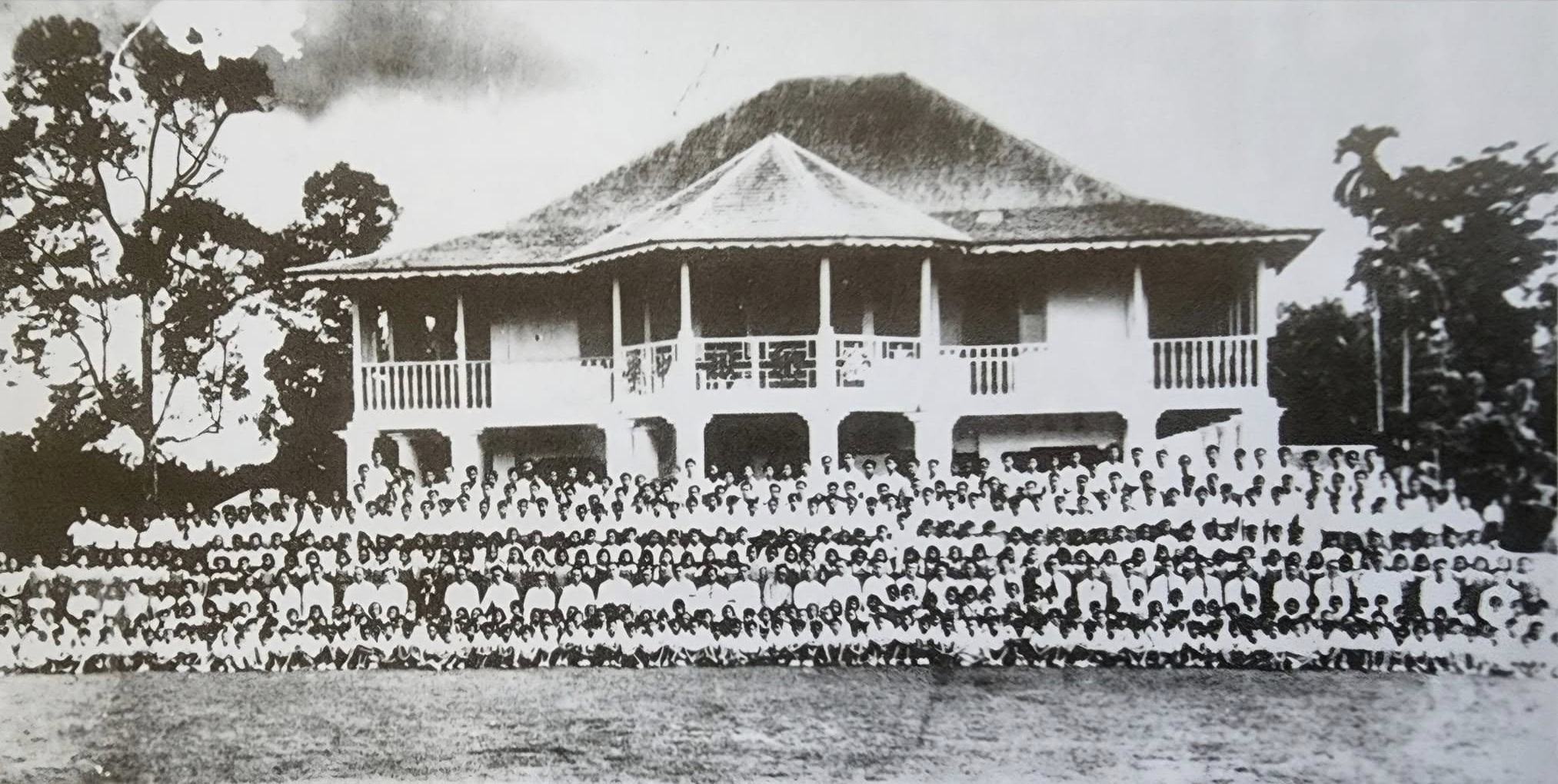
Min Teck School (present-day the SMJK converted Kuching High School) with the school board members, teaching staff, and primary and secondary students managed by the Teochew Community of Kuching, pictured in December 1938, Kuching, Raj of Sarawak

Chinese independent high schools in East Malaysia trace their roots to the 18th century British protectorate governments of North Borneo and Raj of Sarawak. The establishment of Chinese independent high schools in both regions contrasted with the historical development of Chinese schools in West Malaysia, as many of these institutions were allowed to operate privately as per the different autonomous administrations and further safeguarded through the Malaysia Agreement instead of undergoing compulsory conversion. The schools underscore the significance of the three languages: Chinese, Malay, and English, receiving support from both public and state governments of both Sabah and Sarawak. Since 1933, the majority of Chinese schools in the Raj of Sarawak have been administered by the secretary of Chinese affairs, particularly following the closure of the Education Department. During the Brooke administration, Chinese independent education enjoyed substantial freedom because the government emphasised that each ethnic group in Sarawak should maintain its unique identity through education tailored to its cultural patterns, without strict enforcement of the Western curriculum or the English language on locals. This motivation resulted in the founding of Chinese vernacular education institutions across Sarawak. Between 1912 and 1917, Chinese vernacular schools proliferated swiftly, resulting in the establishment of 11 Chinese vernacular primary schools in Sarawak within a mere six years. The Japanese occupation in 1941 and subsequent British Military Administration (BMA) in 1945 temporarily halted the operation until the end of the war. The policy changed when Sarawak became part of the Crown colony in 1946. In the 1950s, the British colonial government released various educational reports, including the Report Upon Financing of Education and Condition of Service in the Teaching Profession in Sarawak (1955) and D. McLellan's Report on Secondary Education (1959), along with a policy termed the Grant Code Regulation (1956), which facilitated the conversion of Chinese independent high schools to English-medium institutions.

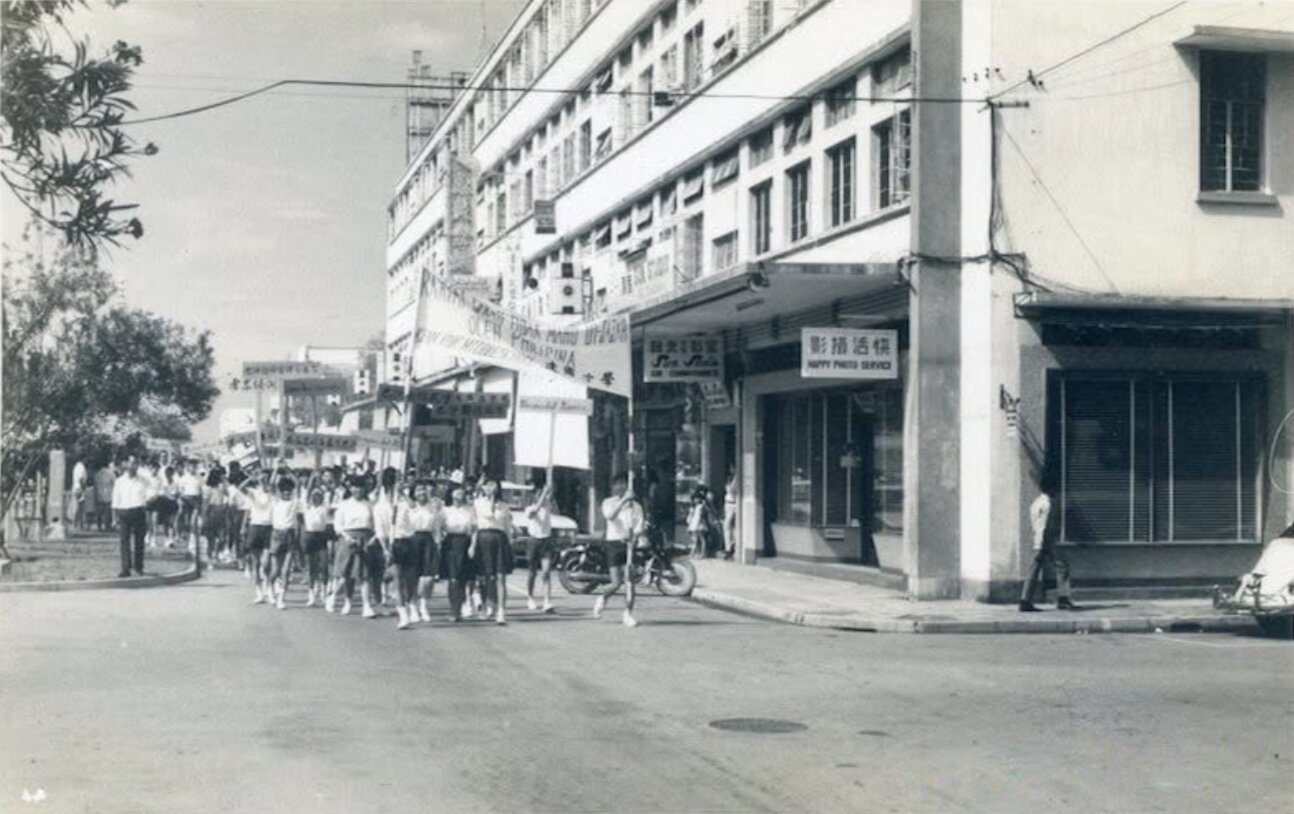
Students from the Kian Kok Middle School parading together in Beach Street, Jesselton, to protest the Philippine claim in Sabah, 1968

Prior to the establishment of the Malaysian federation, the British government taking efforts to standardise the educational policies of Sarawak and Malaya by instituting a national education system, administering the Common Entrance Examination, and enacting the Education Act (1961). Around 1958, the British Crown colony authorities who ruled Sarawak shared concerns about communism in the Chinese community, particularly among the Chinese-educated student body, a concern that the dominant local Malay and indigenous populations also felt and later escalated into an insurgency in 1962. The British administration proposed that the 18 high schools using Chinese as the medium of teaching be converted into using English. In 1961, a letter was sent by the Crown colony authorities to all of the Chinese-medium high schools demanding them to convert teaching of all subjects into English before 1 April 1962. Any schools that failed to comply would not be given any allocations from the government. In 1960, there were 18 high schools using Chinese as the medium of teaching and 22 high schools teaching in the English medium in Sarawak alone. Despite strong rejection by the local Chinese community, the plan still took place. In the end, six high schools out of the 18 refused to convert to teaching in English; they were the Chung Hua Middle School No. 1, Chung Hua Middle School No. 3, Chung Hua Middle School No. 4, Guong Ming Middle School, Kiang Hin Middle School and Kai Dee Middle School. The rest of the school which converted into English medium schools ended up as "SMJK" after Sarawak joined to form the Federation of Malaysia. In 1973, these English medium schools were once again converted into using Malay language as the medium of teaching. The Chinese community not only continued to support the six high schools which retained the teaching in Chinese (founded in between 1945 and 1960), they had even founded another eight high schools between 1962 and 1968. These 14 high schools then became a part of Malaysia's Chinese independent high school and still exist today.

In North Borneo (Sabah), both the local Chinese community and Christian missionary groups played an earlier role in providing formal education to the inhabitants in the 19th century, with many Chinese primary vernacular schools – from 22 in 1917 to 59 in 1940. All of the nine Chinese independent high schools in the state were formed in between 1960 and 1968. Some of these schools were virtually converted into English high schools in 1971. Jointly combined, there are a total of 23 Chinese independent high schools in East Malaysia.

== Characteristics ==
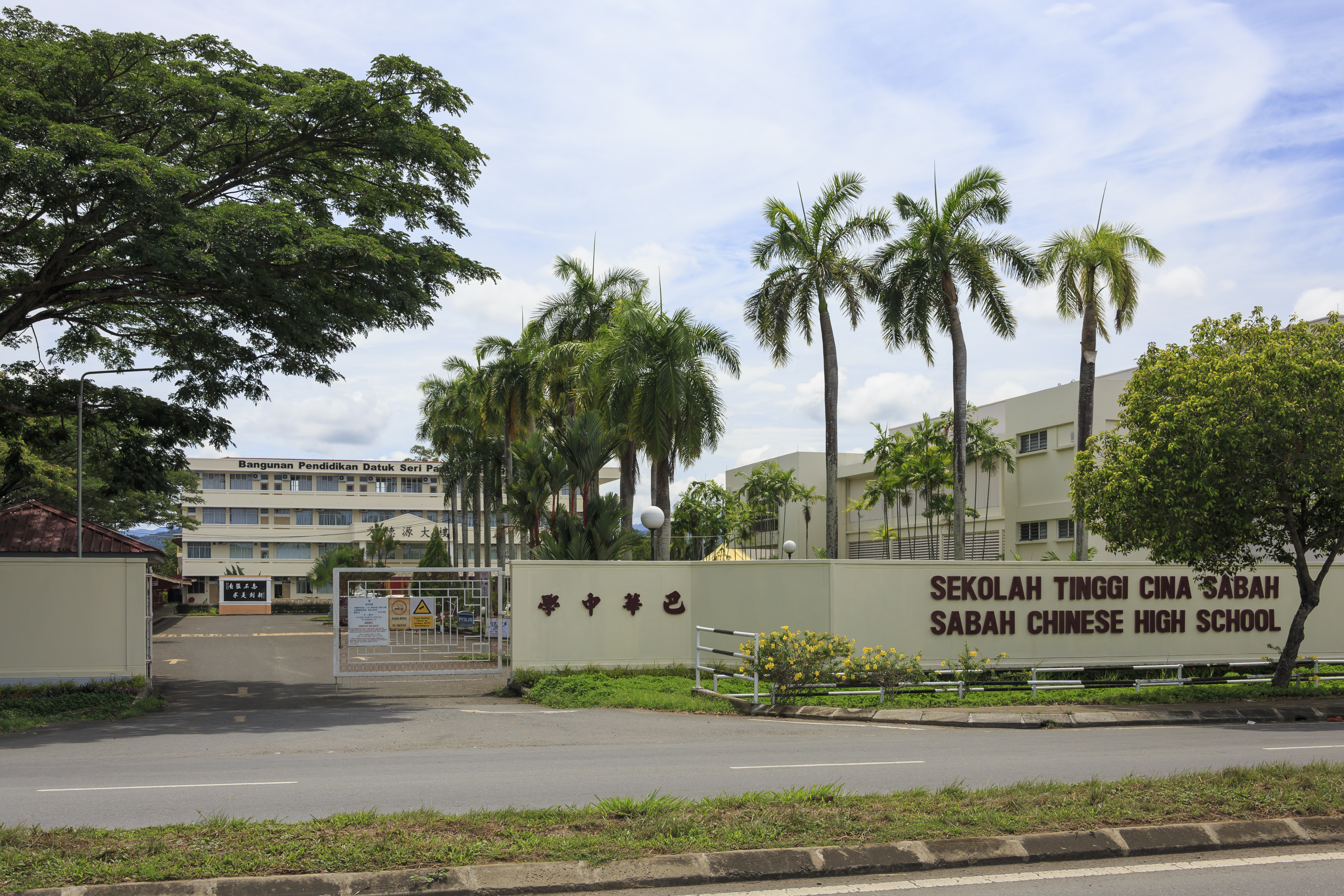
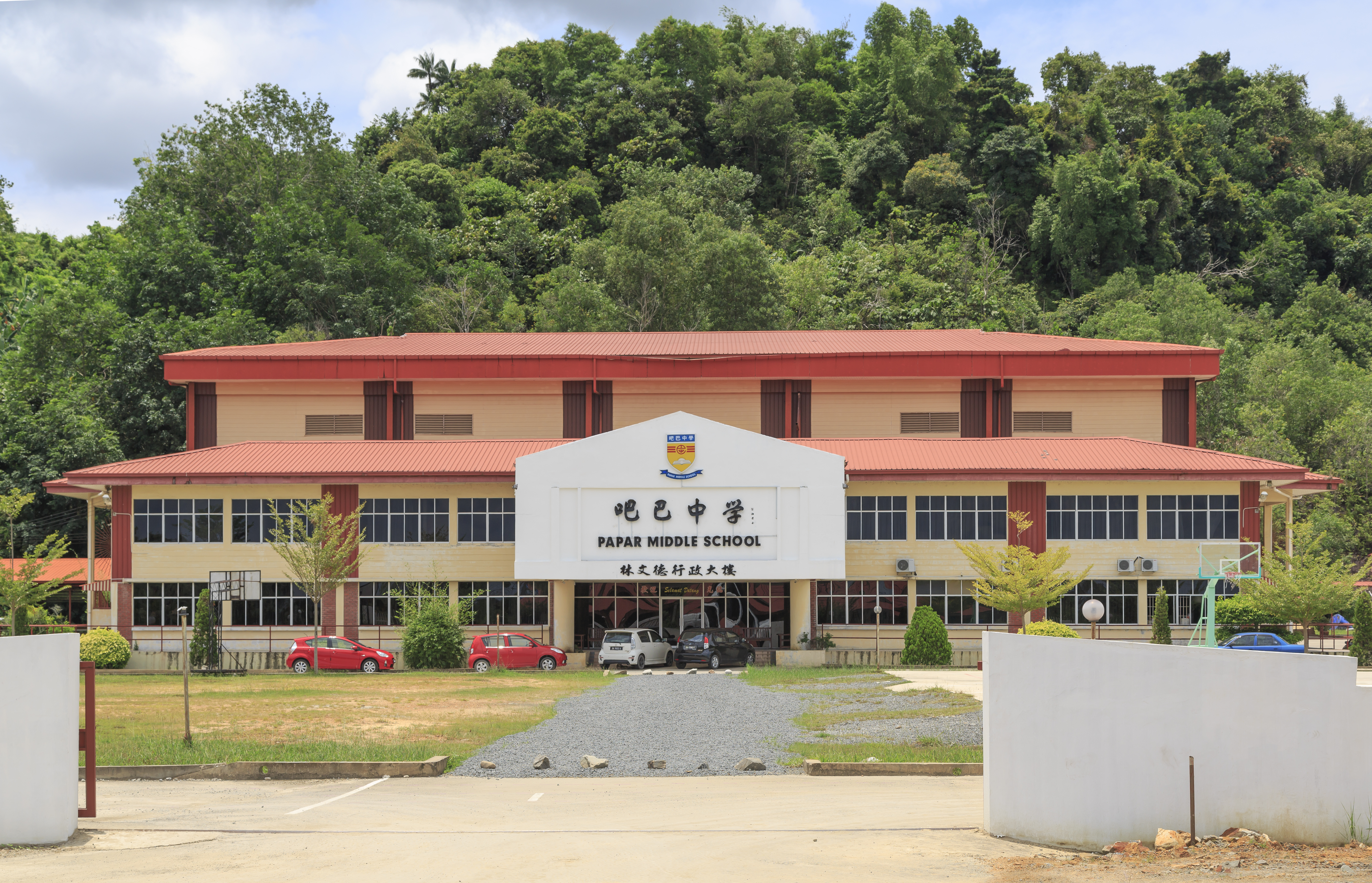
(Left) Sabah Chinese High School in Tawau District, Sabah
(Right) Papar Middle School in Papar District, Sabah

Students usually spend six years in a Chinese Independent High School. The six years are divided into two stages: three years in junior middle and three years in senior middle, similar to the secondary school systems in mainland China and Taiwan. Students are streamed into tracks like Science or Art/Commerce in the senior middle stage. At the end of each stage, students sit for the Unified Examination Certificate (UEC). A few schools offer an additional year in senior middle, catering to students taking the government's Sijil Tinggi Pelajaran Malaysia (STPM, equivalent to A-level).

Chinese independent high schools use the same academic year as government schools. An academic year consists of two semesters: Semester 1 from January to May and Semester 2 from June to November, with examinations at the end of each semester. The overall academic performance of a student in an academic year determines his/her promotion to the next study year in the next academic year. Failing requires repeating the study year. Usually, failing to be promoted for two years in a row results in a dismissal, which differs from students in government schools that are automatically promoted regardless of academic performance.

The curriculum used in Chinese independent high schools is developed and coordinated by the Curriculum Department of UCSCAM with reference to secondary education curricula around the world, particularly Malaysia's national secondary education curriculum and those of mainland China as well as Taiwan. UCSCAM publishes textbooks for use in Chinese independent high schools while being monitored by Malaysian Qualifications Agency (MQA) evaluation systems as well as the Ministry of Higher Education.

=== Unified Examination Certificate (UEC) ===
Unified Examination Certificate
- Acronym: UEC (统考)
- Type: Standardised test for university admission
- Administrator: Dong Zong Examinations Board (董总考试局)
- Year started: 1975
- Score range: A to F in Junior Middle Level (Form 3); A1 to F9 in Senior Middle Level (Form 6)
- Offered: Once a year
- Regions: Malaysia
- Languages: Chinese, English available for selected subjects
- Annual number of test takers: 10,926 (2026)
- Fee: For Junior Middle Level: RM160 for Malaysian citizens and RM260 for International students For Senior Middle Level: RM80 for Malaysian citizens and RM180 for International students. Fees of RM40 is added for every subject taken
- Website: uec.dongzong.my

The Unified Examination Certificate (UEC) (Chinese: 华文独立中学统一考试; pinyin: Huáwén dúlì zhōngxué tǒngyī kǎoshì) is a standardised test for Chinese independent high school students organised by the UCSCAM since 1975. The UEC is available in three levels: Junior Middle (UEC-JML), Vocational (UEC-V), and Senior Middle (UEC-SML). Examinations for non-language subjects in the UEC-JML (except in Sabah) and UEC-V are in Chinese. In Sabah, UEC-JML science and mathematics are available in Chinese and English. The UEC-SML has examinations for mathematics, sciences (biology, chemistry and physics), book keeping, accounting, and commerce available in Chinese and English, while other non-language subjects are only available in Chinese.

In 1996, the National Accreditation Board (LAN) was formed by the federal government to accredit private institutions where it functioned under the Ministry of Education. In 2004, the ministry was further reorganised into two ministries: the Ministry of Higher Education (KPT) and the Ministry of Education. In the same year, the LAN required students entering local private colleges using any qualification other than the Sijil Pelajaran Malaysia (SPM) to pass the SPM Malay paper. This drew protests; causing the then Minister of Higher Education Dr Shafie Salleh to later exempted UEC students from this requirement. The UEC-SML is recognised as a qualification for entrance into many tertiary educational institutions around the world, including the United Kingdom, the United States, Taiwan, Hong Kong, China, Japan, Singapore, South Korea, Australia, New Zealand, Canada, Russia, India and many others. It is not recognised by the federal government of Malaysia for entry into public universities, although most private colleges recognise the qualification.

Chinese educationalist Kua Kia Soong mentions the introduction of the UEC in his book Protean Saga: The Chinese Schools of Malaysia. According to the book, the introduction of the UEC once led the then Minister of Education and later the Prime Minister of Malaysia Mahathir Mohamad summoning the Chinese educationalists to parliament. To quote the book, "The latter (Mahathir) did not mince his words but told the Dong Jiao Zong leaders that UEC had better not be held or else ... He did not ask for any response and dismissed the Chinese educationalists with a curt ... 'that is all'". Mahathir characterised the Dong Zong as a "racist group" for their continuous efforts to preserving Chinese education and their resistance to national language policy.

In 2014, Sarawak was the first to recognise UEC, followed by Penang, Selangor, and Malacca. The decision of Sarawak to recognise UEC was affirmed through the statement of Chief Minister Adenan Satem in 2016. In 2019, Sabah followed suit in recognising the examination. In 2024, Sarawak further announced that students who graduate from the examination being eligible to enrol in state-owned universities under the free tertiary education scheme, which begins in 2026. The following year it was reaffirmed by the region premiership. In 2024, the Chief Minister of Sabah, Hajiji Noor explained during a session at the state assembly that the Chinese independent schools in Sabah have a two-stream education system, namely the national curriculum for the SPM examination and the senior UEC, with an emphasis on teaching in Chinese, English and Malay. He said allegations by some groups that independent schools create societal division are unfounded. In September 2025, Sabah further announce that it will recognise the UEC for state scholarship and enrolment in state-owned higher learning institutions. By October 2025, an official circular recognising the examination qualification for Chinese independent secondary schools within the region was released. In 2026, the Sabah state government further announced its commitments to support Chinese schools in the region, with allocations for both Chinese independent schools and national-type Chinese schools being increased.

As the UEC is not recognised by the Malaysian federal government, some Chinese independent high schools opt to teach the national secondary school curriculum (in Malay) alongside the independent school curriculum (in Chinese) and require students to sit for the government standardised tests (PT3, SPM or even STPM) as private school candidates, providing the students an opportunity to obtain government-recognised certificates. On 12 December 2025, Prime Minister Anwar Ibrahim took into consideration that the mastery of Malaysia's national language is the utmost priority as enshrined in the Federal Constitution before the proposals for the recognition of other languages and the UEC, to which the statement was welcomed by the Chairman of the Dong Zong:

Dong Zong reiterates with conviction that the demand for UEC recognition has never been in conflict with the National Education Policy and the Education Act 1996; rather, it complements them. We uphold the dignity of the Malay language in line with the intent of the National Language Act 1963/67 and Article 152 of the Federal Constitution; and not violate them. We wish to continue contributing our strength and service to Malaysia's nation-building; instead of being an impediment to it.

— Tan Yew Sing, Chairman of the United Chinese School Committees’ Association of Malaysia (Dong Zong)

On 15 May 2026, the Cabinet of Malaysia agreed in principle to recognise the qualification as an admission pathway to enter national public universities. In October 2026, during a state assembly session at the Sarawak State Legislative Assembly sitting, the State Deputy Minister of Education, Innovation and Talent Development, Annuar Rapaee, in response to a question from See Chee How (Independent-Batu Lintang), stated UEC holders do not need to pass the Malay language subject as a prerequisite to qualify for Sarawak's Free Tertiary Education Scheme (FTES). This was further echoed by Sarawak Premier Abang Johari Openg, who stated UEC graduates have studied the national language in their independent school since the recent curriculum already included it, and the premier also reaffirmed his commitment since his statement in 2024.

=== Medium of instruction ===
The main medium of instruction in Chinese independent high schools for non-language subjects is Mandarin Chinese using simplified Chinese characters as well as the recent emphasis on Malay and English languages. In some schools, certain subjects at the senior middle levels (the sciences, mathematics, book keeping, accounting and commerce) are taught using English teaching materials and exam papers for those subjects are set in English, but teachers may instruct and explain in Mandarin. For schools that prepare students to take national exams (PT3, SPM and STPM) alongside the UEC, Malay language teaching materials in conjunction with the national curriculum are used in preparatory classes for those exams.

== See also ==
- Education in Malaysia
- National-type Chinese secondary school
