= Sijil Pelajaran Malaysia =

Malaysian national examination

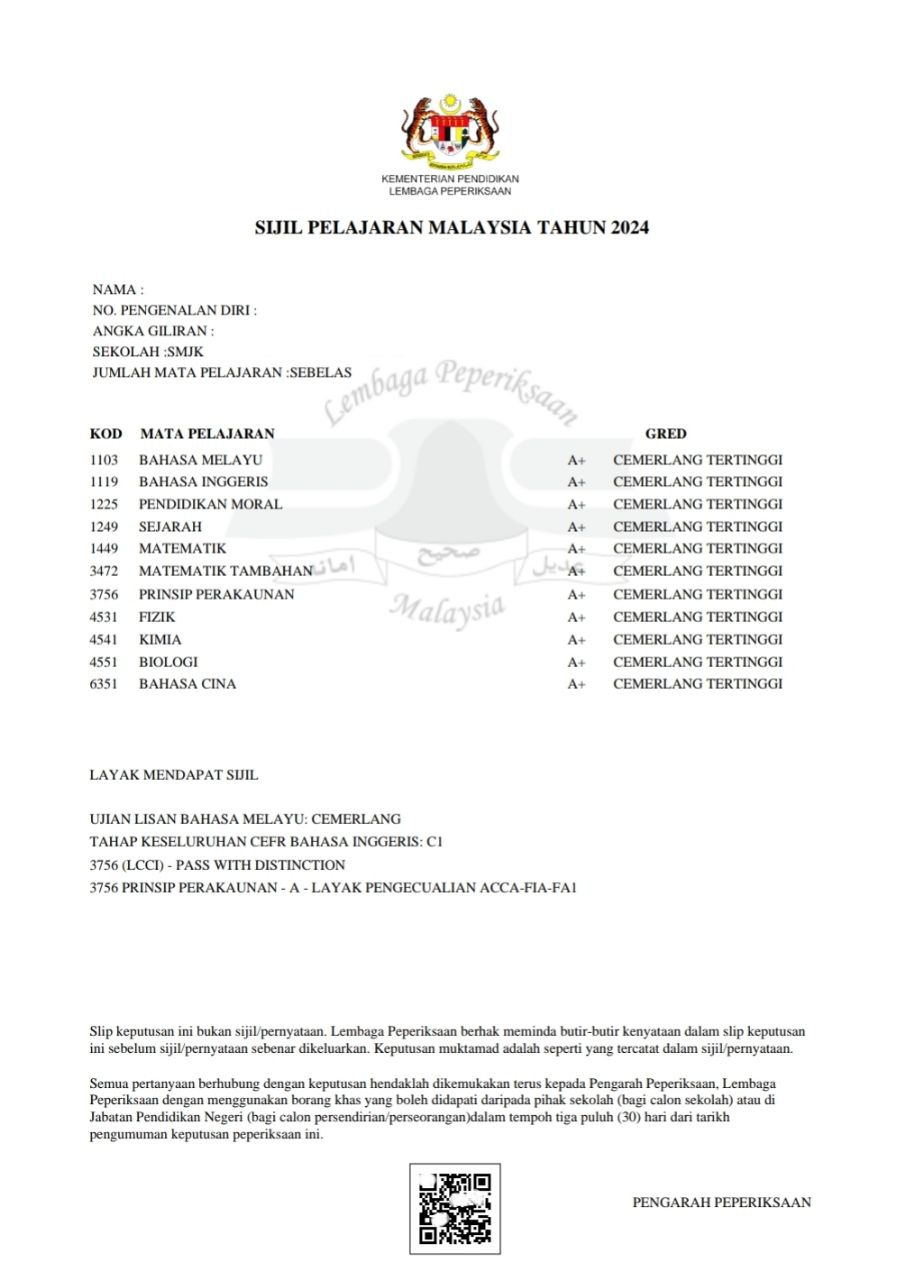
- Acronym: SPM
- Type: Prerequisite to a school leaving certificate
- Administrator: Lembaga Peperiksaan Malaysia
- Skills tested: Varies depending on subject, but in almost all SPM subjects, general knowledge, fundamental writing, and numerical skills are tested.
- Score range: Grades from A+ to G, with A+ being the highest
- Score validity: Lifetime
- Restrictions on attempts: All units for a single subject must be taken in one examination series, but students may take a subject as many times as they like.
- Regions: Malaysia
- Languages: Main instruction languages: Bahasa Malaysia, English; Linguistic electives: Chinese, Tamil, Arabic, Iban, Dusun, Semai, Japanese, German, Korean, French, Punjabi
- Fee: Free to students in schools. Resits and private entries incur variable fees.

The Sijil Pelajaran Malaysia (SPM), or the Malaysian Certificate of Education, is a national examination sat for by all Form 5 secondary school students in Malaysia. It is the equivalent of the General Certificate of Secondary Education (GCSE) of England, Wales and Northern Ireland; the Nationals 4/5 of Scotland; and the GCE Ordinary Level (O Level) of the Commonwealth of Nations. It is the leaving examination of the eleventh grade of schooling. The SPM is sat for by secondary school students before further studies in foundation, STPM, matriculation or diploma. The examination is set and examined by the Malaysian Examinations board. For students attending international schools, the equivalent exam they take is the International General Certificate of Secondary Education (IGCSE) exam, and the Unified Examinations Certificate is equivalent to Advanced Level. All SPM examination papers are considered official confidential property and are protected under the Official Secrets Act 1972 of Malaysia.

In 2021, the Malaysian Ministry of Education introduced a new SPM format for the new KSSM syllabus, which replaced the old SPM format for the old KBSM syllabus. For English, the GCE O Level grade was discontinued, the Common European Framework of Reference syllabus was implemented for the English paper, and the result statement is handed out with the SPM Certificate.

== History ==
The SPM allows Malaysians to continue their studies to the pre-university level. Originally there were two versions of the SPM, which were introduced in 1964: the Malaysian Certificate of Education taken by students studying in English schools and SPM (Sijil Pelajaran Malaysia) taken by students studying in national schools. The difference between the two was that the SPM was conducted using the national language (Bahasa Melayu), while the MCE was conducted in English. The MCE was discontinued in 1976 when the Ministry of Education took over the examination from the University of Cambridge Local Examinations Syndicate (UCLES) and merged it with the SPM. The predecessors of this exam were SPPTM (Sijil Pelajaran Persekutuan Tanah Melayu, which was started in 1962) and FMC (Federation of Malaya Certificate, which started in 1957) before the formation of the Federation of Malaysia.

== Subjects ==
=== Compulsory subjects ===
Certain subjects are mandatory for students. They are:

Code	Subject (Official name)	Subject (English name)	Examination language
1103	Bahasa Melayu	Malay Language	Malay
1119	Bahasa Inggeris	English Language	English
1223	Pendidikan Islam^{[a]}	Islamic Education	Malay
1225	Pendidikan Moral^{[b]}	Moral Education	Malay
1249	Sejarah	History	Malay
1449	Matematik	Mathematics	English and Malay
1511	Sains^{[c]}	Science	English and Malay

^{a} Compulsory for all Muslim students except for students in the Islamic Science stream, who are required to take their respective electives in lieu of this subject.

^{b} for all non-Muslim students.

^{c} Compulsory for students in the Commerce, Literature and Arts streams only. Students in the Pure Science, Islamic Science, and Humanities Science streams are required to take their respective Science electives in lieu of this subject.

=== Elective subjects ===
At the end of Form 3, Form 3 students are required to sit for the final exam — Ujian Akhir Sesi Akademik Tingkatan 3. Based on their result, performance and interest, students will be streamed into the streams that suit them the most for the following 2 final upper form years of schooling.

==== Science and mathematics ====
Code	Subject (Official name)	Subject (English name)	Examination language
3472	Matematik Tambahan	Additional Mathematics	English and Malay
4531	Fizik	Physics	English and Malay
4541	Kimia	Chemistry	English and Malay
4551	Biologi	Biology	English and Malay
4561	Sains Tambahan	Additional Science	English and Malay

In 2003, the medium of instruction for the science and mathematics subjects was switched from Malay to English. Due to this transition, students taking science and mathematics subjects can choose to sit for the exams in either English or Malay.

==== Languages and literature ====
Code	Subject (Official name)	Subject (English name)	Examination language
2205	Kesusasteraan Inggeris	English Literature	English
2215	Kesusasteraan Melayu Komunikatif	Communicative Malay Literature	Malay
2361	Bahasa Arab (اللغة العربية)	Arabic Language	Arabic
6351	Bahasa Cina (华文) *	Chinese Language	Simplified Chinese
6354	Bahasa Tamil (தமிழ்மொழி)	Tamil Language	Tamil
6356	Bahasa Iban (jaku Iban)	Iban Language	Iban
6357	Bahasa Kadazandusun (Boros Momogun)	Kadazandusun Language	Kadazandusun
6358	Bahasa Semai (Engrok Semai)	Semai Language	Semai
6401	Bahasa Jepun (日本語)	Japanese Language	Japanese
6405	Bahasa Jerman (Deutsch)	German Language	German
6406	Bahasa Korea (한국어)	Korean Language	Korean
6407	Bahasa Cina Komunikasi (交际华语)	Communicative Chinese Language	Simplified Chinese
9216	Kesusasteraan Cina (华文文学)	Chinese Literature	Simplified Chinese
9217	Kesusasteraan Tamil (தமிழ் இலக்கியம்)	Tamil Literature	Tamil
9303	Bahasa Perancis (Français)	French Language	French
9378	Bahasa Punjabi (ਪੰਜਾਬੀ)	Punjabi Language	Punjabi

*Chinese Language is compulsory for all National-type Chinese secondary school (SMJK) students (Bahasa Cina)

==== Economics and business ====
Code	Subject (Official name)	Subject (English name)	Examination language
3754	Pengajian Keusahawanan	Entrepreneurial Studies	Malay
3766	Perniagaan	Business	Malay
3756	Prinsip Perakaunan	Principles of Accounting	Malay
3767	Ekonomi	Economics	Malay

==== Social Sciences and religion ====
Code	Subject (Official name)	Subject (English name)	Examination language
2280	Geografi	Geography	Malay
5226	Tasawwur Islam	Islamic Worldviews	Malay
5227	Pendidikan Al-Quran dan Al-Sunnah	Quran and Sunnah Studies	Malay
5228	Pendidikan Syariah Islamiah	Islamic Law Studies	Malay
5301	Hifz Al-Quran	Quran Recitation	Arabic
5302	Maharat Al-Quran	Quran Skills	Arabic
5303	Turath Al-Quran dan Al-Sunnah	Quran and Sunnah Classics	Arabic
5304	Turath Dirasat Islamiah	Islamic Studies Classics	Arabic
5305	Turath Bahasa Arab	Arabic Language Classics	Arabic
5401	Usul Al-Din	Foundational Islamic Theology	Arabic
5402	Al-Syariah	Islamic Law	Arabic
5403	Al-Lughah Al-'Arabiah Al-Mu'asirah	Arabic Language	Arabic
5404	Manahij Al-'Ulum Al-Islamiah	Islamic Logic	Arabic
5405	Al-Adab Wa Al-Balaghah	Arabic Literature and Rhetorics	Arabic
9221	Bible Knowledge	Bible Knowledge	English

==== Arts and health ====
Code	Subject (Official name)	Subject (English name)	Examination language
2611	Pendidikan Seni Visual	Visual Arts Education	Malay
2621	Pendidikan Muzik	Music Education	Malay
4572	Sains Sukan	Sports Science	Malay

==== Technical and vocational ====
Code	Subject (Official name)	Subject (English name)	Examination language
3729	Pertanian	Agriculture	Malay
3759	Lukisan Kejuruteraan	Engineering Drawing	Malay
3760	Pengajian Kejuruteraan Mekanikal	Mechanical Engineering Studies	Malay
3761	Pengajian Kejuruteraan Awam	Civil Engineering Studies	Malay
3762	Pengajian Kejuruteraan Elektrik dan Elektronik	Electrical and Electronic Engineering Studies	Malay
3763	Reka Cipta	Design	Malay
3768	Asas Kelestarian	Basics of Sustainability	Malay
3769	Sains Rumah Tangga	Home Science	Malay
3770	Sains Komputer	Computer Science	Malay
3771	Grafik Komunikasi Teknikal	Technical Communication Graphics	Malay
7101	Pembinaan Domestik	Domestic Construction	Malay
7102	Membuat Perabot	Furniture Making	Malay
7103	Kerja Paip Domestik	Domestic Plumbing	Malay
7104	Pendawaian Domestik	Domestic Wiring	Malay
7105	Kimpalan Arka dan Gas	Arc and Gas Welding	Malay
7106	Menservis Automobil	Automobile Servicing	Malay
7107	Menservis Motosikal	Motorcycle Servicing	Malay
7108	Menservis Peralatan Penyejukan dan Penyamanan Udara	Air-Conditioning Servicing	Malay
7109	Menservis Peralatan Elektrik Domestik	Domestic Electrical Appliances Servicing	Malay
7201	Rekaan dan Jahitan Pakaian	Design and Tailoring	Malay
7202	Katering dan Penyajian	Catering Service	Malay
7203	Pemprosesan Makanan	Food Processing	Malay
7204	Penjagaan Muka dan Penggayaan Rambut	Facial and Hair Care	Malay
7205	Asuhan dan Pendidikan Awal Kanak-Kanak	Infant Care and Early Childhood Education	Malay
7206	Gerontologi Asas dan Perkhidmatan Geriatrik	Geriatic Services	Malay
7301	Landskap dan Nurseri	Nursery and Landscape	Malay
7302	Akuakultur dan Haiwan Rekreasi	Aquaculture and Pets	Malay
7303	Tanaman Makanan	Food and Crop Cultivation	Malay
7401	Produksi Reka Tanda	Signage Design	Malay
7402	Hiasan Dalaman	Interior Design	Malay
7403	Produksi Multimedia	Multimedia Production	Malay
7404	Reka Bentuk Grafik Digital	Digital Graphic Design	Malay

=== Removed subjects ===
Due to the switch from the KBSM syllabus to the KSSM syllabus in 2017, some subjects were removed. The list does not include courses that have minor changes in name only.

Old subject name	New subject name
3775 Perdagangan	3766 Perniagaan
3757 Ekonomi Asas	3767 Ekonomi
3758 Ekonomi Rumah Tangga	3769 Sains Rumah Tangga
3764 Engineering Technology	3768 Asas Kelestarian
3765 Information and Communication Technology	3770 Sains Komputer
3728 Sains Pertanian	3729 Pertanian
4571 Pengetahuan Sains Sukan	4572 Sains Sukan
Terminated subjects
4581 Applied Science
6355 English for Science and Technology

== Results ==
When releasing the results, only the letter grades (and not the actual scores) are revealed to the candidates. Candidates may request a remarking (regrading) if they suspect errors in the original marking. Although no list of rankings is released to the public, the names of the top-ranked students in the country and in each state are released to the press.

Since 2010, the Ministry of Education has imposed a ten-subject limit on every candidate while lowering the minimum number of subjects from eight to six. Students are allowed to take two additional subjects (from Arabic, Chinese, Tamil, Iban, Kadazandusun languages and Bible Knowledge) but they will not be considered for government scholarships.

== Grade system ==
Candidates are assigned grades based on their scores in each subject. The exact grading scale used every year has never been made public.

Since 2009, the grading system ranged from A+ (the highest grade) to G (for gagal or fail; F is not used). The previous system assigned a grade point and a letter to each range, with 1A ("1" being the grade point and "A" the letter grade) as the highest and 9G the lowest. The Kepujian (Pass-With-Credit) grade is equivalent to the UK GCSE Pass-With-Credit grade as stated on the back of the certificates.

2000–2008	From 2009	Grade value	Description	
N/A	A+	0	Cemerlang Tertinggi (Highest Distinction)	Cemerlang Pass With Distinction
1A	A	1	Cemerlang Tinggi (High Distinction)	Cemerlang Pass With Distinction
2A	A-	2	Cemerlang (Distinction)	Cemerlang Pass With Distinction
3B	B+	3	Kepujian Tertinggi (Highest Credit)	Kepujian Pass With Credit (UK GCSE Equivalent with said category)
4B	B	4	Kepujian Tinggi (High Credit)	Kepujian Pass With Credit (UK GCSE Equivalent with said category)
5C	C+	5	Kepujian Atas (Upper Credit)	Kepujian Pass With Credit (UK GCSE Equivalent with said category)
6C	C	6	Kepujian (Credit)	Kepujian Pass With Credit (UK GCSE Equivalent with said category)
7D	D	7	Lulus Atas (Upper Pass)	Lulus Pass
8E	E	8	Lulus (Pass)	Lulus Pass
9G	G	9	Gagal (Fail)	Gagal (Fail)

== Sijil Pelajaran Malaysia Ulangan (SPMU) ==
The Malay language (Bahasa Melayu) was slowly introduced into the national school system from 1960 but was only made a compulsory subject in 1970. Furthermore, a credit in Bahasa Melayu is essential in order to secure a seat in sixth form. One of the many problems associated with this change is that many "good" students were unable to continue their post-secondary education because of their examination result in Bahasa Melayu. In 1972, the BM failure rate was nearly 40%, and the July Paper was introduced as a solution so that students would be given a second chance to retake the paper.

As time passed, changes were made in education policy and from the higher education institution standpoint. In 2013, history became the second compulsory subject. Many universities also required students to achieve at least C in Mathematics or, in some colleges, to achieve at least a passing grade. Because of this change and demand, the examination syndicates announced that the history and mathematics papers would become available to retake along with the Bahasa Melayu paper in the SPMU.
