= Outline of Malaysia =

Country in Southeast Asia

The Flag of Malaysia

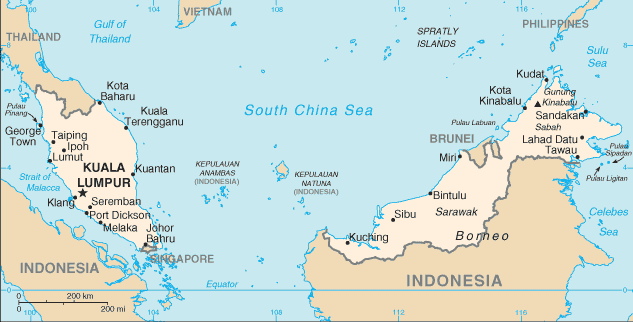
An enlargeable map of Malaysia

The following outline is provided as an overview of and topical guide to Malaysia:

Malaysia is a sovereign country located on the Malay Peninsula and a northern portion of the Island of Borneo in Southeast Asia. It comprises 13 states and three federal territories with a total land area of 329,847 square kilometres (127,355 sq mi). The capital of Malaysia is Kuala Lumpur, while Putrajaya is the seat of the federal government.

The population stands at over 32 million. The country is separated into two regions—Peninsular Malaysia and Malaysian Borneo—by the South China Sea. Malaysia borders Thailand, Indonesia, Singapore, Brunei, the Philippines, and Vietnam. The country is located near the equator and experiences a tropical climate.

Malaysia is headed by the Yang di-Pertuan Agong and politically led by a Prime Minister. The government is closely modeled after the Westminster parliamentary system.

== General reference ==
- Pronunciation: /məˈleɪʒə/ or /məˈleɪziə/
- Common English country name: Malaysia
- Official English country name: Malaysia
- Common endonym(s): Malaysia
- Official endonym(s): Malaysia
- Adjectival(s): Malaysian
- Demonym(s): Malaysians
- Etymology: Name of Malaysia
- International rankings of Malaysia
- ISO country codes: MY, MYS, 458
- ISO region codes: See ISO 3166-2:MY
- Internet country code top-level domain: .my

== History of Malaysia ==
- Military history of Malaysia

=== Events and treaties ===
- Anglo-Dutch Treaty of 1824
- Burney Treaty
- Anglo-Siamese Treaty of 1909
- Battle of Malaya
- Sandakan Death Marches
- Brunei Revolt
- Indonesia–Malaysia confrontation
- May 13 incident
- Mat Salleh Rebellion

=== Small area histories ===
- History of Kuala Lumpur
- History of Penang

== Politics of Malaysia ==
Politics of Malaysia

- Form of government: Federal constitutional elective monarchy and parliamentary democracy
- Capital of Malaysia: Kuala Lumpur
- Flag of Malaysia
- Elections in Malaysia
  - 1955, 1959, 1964, 1969, 1974, 1978, 1982, 1986, 1990, 1995, 1999, 2004, 2008, 2013, 2018, 2022
- Political parties in Malaysia
- Political parties in Malaysia
  - National Front (Barisan Nasional)
    - United Malays National Organisation^{N1} (UMNO)
    - Malaysian Chinese Association (MCA)
    - Malaysian Indian Congress (MIC)
    - People's Progressive Party (PPP)
    - United Traditional Bumiputera Party (PBB)
    - Sarawak United People's Party (SUPP)
    - Sabah Progressive Party (SAPP)
    - Sabah United Party^{N2} (PBS)
    - Liberal Democratic Party (LDP)
    - United Sabah People's Party (PBRS)
    - United Pasokmomogun Kadazandusun Murut Organisation (UPKO)
    - Sarawak Progressive Democratic Party (SPDP)
    - Sarawak People's Party (PRS)
  - Alliance of Hope (Pakatan Harapan)
    - People's Justice Party (Keadilan; PKR)
    - Democratic Action Party (DAP)
    - National Trust Party (AMANAH)
  - National Alliance (Perikatan National)
    - Parti Pribumi Bersatu Malaysia (BERSATU; PBBM)
    - Pan-Malaysian Islamic Party^{N3} (PAS)
    - Parti Gerakan Rakyat Malaysia (GERAKAN; PGRM)
  - Malaysian People's Party (PRM)
  - Socialist Party of Malaysia (PSM)
  - Malaysian Democratic Party (MDP)
  - Malaysian United Democratic Alliance (MUDA)
- Yang di-Pertuan Agong (King of Malaysia)
  - Conference of Rulers
- Civil Service in Malaysia

=== Branches of the government of Malaysia ===
Government of Malaysia

==== Executive branch of the government of Malaysia ====
- Head of state: Yang di-Pertuan Agong, Sultan Ibrahim Iskandar
- Head of government: Prime Minister of Malaysia, Anwar Ibrahim
- Cabinet of Malaysia
- Ministries of Malaysia
  - Ministry of Home Affairs
  - Ministry of Education
  - Ministry of Foreign Affairs
  - Ministry of Higher Education
  - Ministry of Internal Security (Malaysia)
  - Ministry of Science, Technology and Innovation
  - Ministry of Women, Family and Community Development
  - Ministry of the Federal Territories

==== Legislative branch of the government of Malaysia ====
- Parliament of Malaysia (bicameral)
  - Upper house: Dewan Negara
  - Lower house: Dewan Rakyat

==== Judicial branch of the government of Malaysia ====
Courts of Malaysia

- Federal Court of Malaysia
- Court of Appeal of Malaysia
- High Courts of Malaysia
- Syariah Court

=== Foreign relations of Malaysia ===
Foreign relations of Malaysia

- Diplomatic missions in Malaysia
- Diplomatic missions of Malaysia

==== International organisation membership ====
Malaysia is a member of:

- Asian Development Bank (ADB)
- Asia-Pacific Economic Cooperation (APEC)
- Asia-Pacific Telecommunity (APT)
- Association of Southeast Asian Nations (ASEAN)
- Association of Southeast Asian Nations Regional Forum (ARF)
- Bank for International Settlements (BIS)
- Colombo Plan (CP)
- Commonwealth of Nations
- East Asia Summit (EAS)
- Food and Agriculture Organization (FAO)
- Group of 15 (G15)
- Group of 77 (G77)
- International Atomic Energy Agency (IAEA)
- International Bank for Reconstruction and Development (IBRD)
- International Chamber of Commerce (ICC)
- International Civil Aviation Organization (ICAO)
- International Criminal Police Organization (Interpol)
- International Development Association (IDA)
- International Federation of Red Cross and Red Crescent Societies (IFRCS)
- International Finance Corporation (IFC)
- International Fund for Agricultural Development (IFAD)
- International Hydrographic Organization (IHO)
- International Labour Organization (ILO)
- International Maritime Organization (IMO)
- International Mobile Satellite Organization (IMSO)
- International Monetary Fund (IMF)
- International Olympic Committee (IOC)
- International Organization for Standardization (ISO)
- International Red Cross and Red Crescent Movement (ICRM)
- International Telecommunication Union (ITU)
- International Telecommunications Satellite Organization (ITSO)
- International Trade Union Confederation (ITUC)
- Inter-Parliamentary Union (IPU)
- Islamic Development Bank (IDB)
- Multilateral Investment Guarantee Agency (MIGA)
- Nonaligned Movement (NAM)
- Organisation of Islamic Cooperation (OIC)
- Organisation for the Prohibition of Chemical Weapons (OPCW)
- Pacific Islands Forum (PIF) (partner)
- Permanent Court of Arbitration (PCA)
- United Nations (UN)
- United Nations Conference on Trade and Development (UNCTAD)
- United Nations Educational, Scientific, and Cultural Organization (UNESCO)
- United Nations Industrial Development Organization (UNIDO)
- United Nations Integrated Mission in Timor-Leste (UNMIT)
- United Nations Interim Force in Lebanon (UNIFIL)
- United Nations Mission for the Referendum in Western Sahara (MINURSO)
- United Nations Mission in Liberia (UNMIL)
- United Nations Mission in the Sudan (UNMIS)
- United Nations Organization Mission in the Democratic Republic of the Congo (MONUC)
- Universal Postal Union (UPU)
- World Confederation of Labour (WCL)
- World Customs Organization (WCO)
- World Federation of Trade Unions (WFTU)
- World Health Organization (WHO)
- World Intellectual Property Organization (WIPO)
- World Meteorological Organization (WMO)
- World Tourism Organization (UNWTO)
- World Trade Organization (WTO)

=== Law and order in Malaysia ===
Law of Malaysia

- Capital punishment in Malaysia
- Constitution of Malaysia
- Crime in Malaysia
- Human rights in Malaysia
  - LGBT rights in Malaysia
  - Freedom of religion in Malaysia
- Law enforcement in Malaysia

=== Military of Malaysia ===
Military of Malaysia

- Command
  - Commander-in-chief: Supreme Commander of the Malaysian Armed Forces, Muhammad V of Kelantan
  - Chief of Defence Forces: General (Jen) Tan Sri Zulkifli Zainal Abidin
    - Ministry of Defence of Malaysia
- Forces
  - Army of Malaysia
  - Navy of Malaysia
  - Air Force of Malaysia
  - Malaysian Special Operations Force
- Military history of Malaysia

== Geography of Malaysia ==
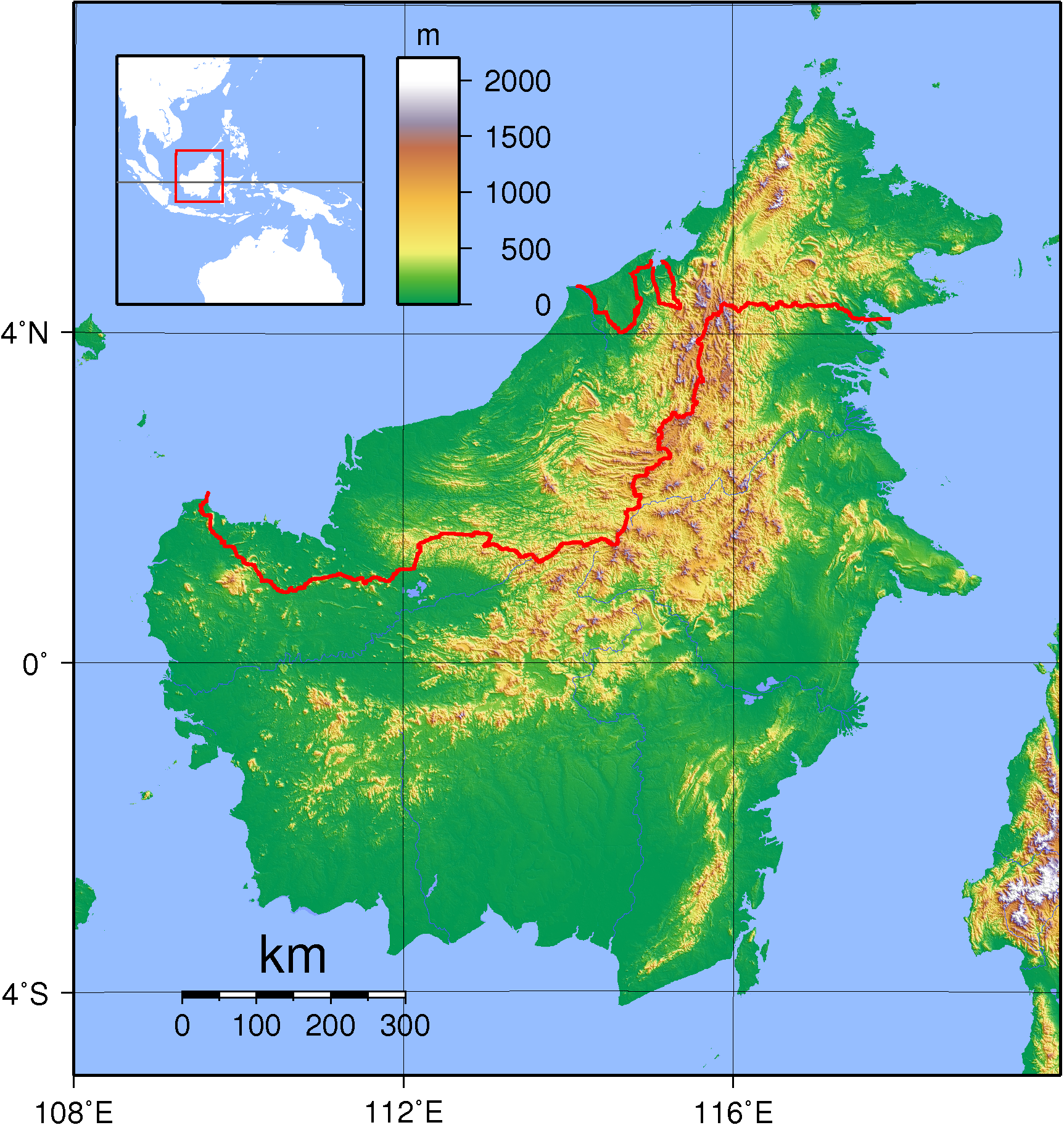
An enlargeable topographic map of the island of Borneo

Geography of Malaysia

- Malaysia is: a megadiverse country
- Location:
  - Northern Hemisphere and Eastern Hemisphere
  - Eurasia (both on the mainland and offshore)
    - Asia
      - Southeast Asia
        - Malay Peninsula
        - Borneo
  - Time zone: Malaysian Standard Time = ASEAN Common Time (UTC+08)
  - Extreme points of Malaysia
    - High: Gunung Kinabalu 4,095 m (13,435 ft)
    - Low: South China Sea and Indian Ocean 0 m
  - Land boundaries: 2,669 km

Indonesia 1,782 km
Thailand 506 km
Brunei 381 km

- Coastline: 4,675 km
  - Peninsular Malaysia 2,068 km
  - East Malaysia 2,607 km

- Population of Malaysia: 27,730,000 - 43rd most populous country
- Area of Malaysia: 329,847 km^{2} - 66th largest country
- Atlas of Malaysia
- Malaysian Standard Time

=== Environment of Malaysia ===
Environment of Malaysia

- Climate of Malaysia
- Environmental issues in Malaysia
- List of ecoregions in Malaysia
- Renewable energy in Malaysia
- Protected areas of Malaysia
  - National parks of Malaysia
- Wildlife of Malaysia
  - Birds of Malaysia
  - Mammals of Malaysia

==== Natural geographic features of Malaysia ====
- Islands of Malaysia
- Lakes of Malaysia
- Mountains of Malaysia
  - Volcanoes in Malaysia
  - Caves in Malaysia
- Rivers of Malaysia
- List of World Heritage Sites in Malaysia

=== Regions of Malaysia ===
- West Malaysia (Peninsula Malaysia)
- East Malaysia (Malaysian Borneo)

==== Ecoregions of Malaysia ====
List of ecoregions in Malaysia

- Ecoregions in Malaysia

=== Administrative divisions of Malaysia ===
==== States of Malaysia ====
States of Malaysia

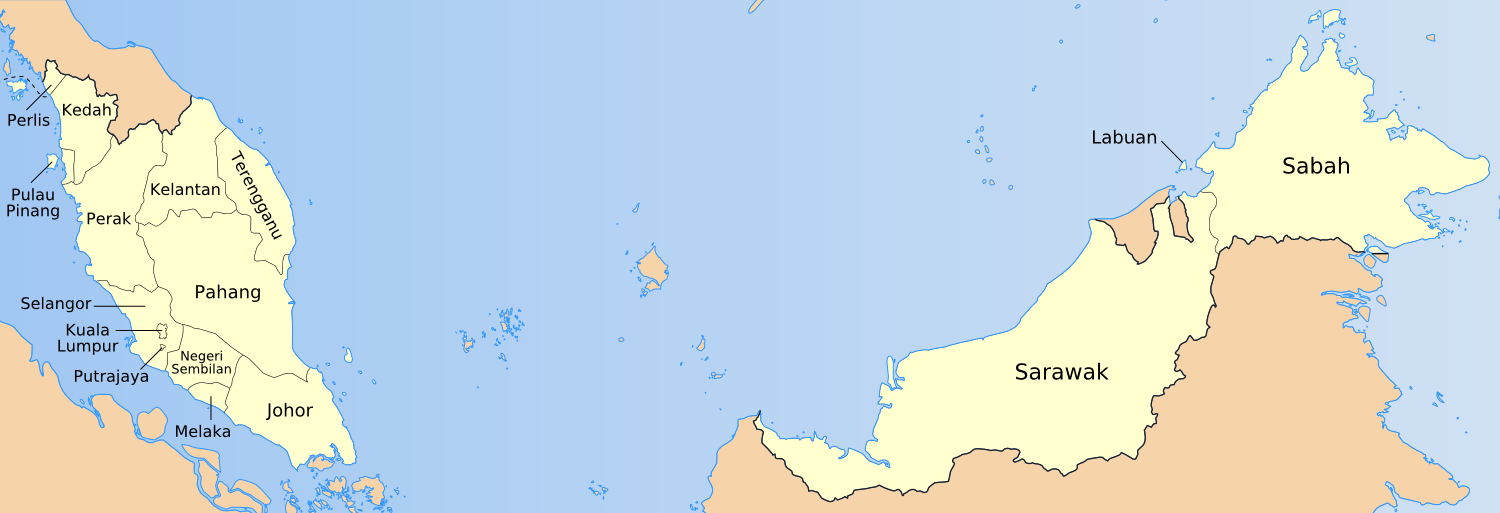
The states and federal territories of Malaysia.

Malaysia has 13 states:

1. Johor
2. Kedah
3. Kelantan
4. Malacca (Melaka)
5. Negeri Sembilan
6. Pahang
7. Perak
8. Perlis
9. Penang (Pulau Pinang)
10. Sabah
11. Sarawak
12. Selangor
13. Terengganu

==== Federal territories of Malaysia ====
Malaysia also has three federal territories, which are governed directly by the federal government of Malaysia:

1. Kuala Lumpur
2. Labuan
3. Putrajaya

==== Municipalities of Malaysia ====
Local government in Malaysia

- Cities of Malaysia
  - Capital of Malaysia: Kuala Lumpur
  - State capitals of Malaysia
  - Cities, by population

==== Districts of Malaysia ====
- Districts of Malaysia
  - Mukim

== Economy and infrastructure of Malaysia ==
Economy of Malaysia

- Economic rank, by nominal GDP (2007): 38th (thirty-eighth)
- Agriculture in Malaysia
- Accounting in Malaysia
- Banking in Malaysia
  - Banks in Malaysia
  - National Bank of Malaysia
  - Islamic banking
  - Currency of Malaysia: Ringgit
    - ISO 4217: MYR
- Communications in Malaysia
  - Internet in Malaysia
- Companies of Malaysia
- Energy in Malaysia
- Health care in Malaysia
- Mining in Malaysia
- Science and technology in Malaysia
- Poverty in Malaysia
- Malaysia Stock Exchange
- Telecommunications in Malaysia
- Tourism in Malaysia
- Transport in Malaysia
  - Airports in Malaysia
  - Rail transport in Malaysia
  - Roads in Malaysia
- Water supply and sanitation in Malaysia

=== Economic plans and policies ===
- First Malaysia Plan
- Second Malaysia Plan
- Malaysian New Economic Policy
- National Development Policy
- Energy policy of Malaysia

== Demography of Malaysia ==
Demographics of Malaysia

- Languages of Malaysia
- Malaysian citizenship
- Healthcare in Malaysia

=== Religion ===
Religion in Malaysia

- Buddhism in Malaysia
- Christianity in Malaysia
- Hinduism in Malaysia
- Islam in Malaysia
- Judaism in Malaysia
- Sikhism in Malaysia
- Taoism in Malaysia

=== Ethnicities ===
- Bumiputra
- Malaysian Chinese
- Malaysian Indian
- Malaysian Malays
- Malaysian Siamese

== Culture of Malaysia ==
Culture of Malaysia

- Cuisine of Malaysia
- Media of Malaysia
- Museums in Malaysia
- Prostitution in Malaysia
- National symbols of Malaysia
  - Coat of arms of Malaysia
  - Flag of Malaysia
  - National anthem of Malaysia
- Royal Regalia of Malaysia
- People of Malaysia
- Public holidays in Malaysia
- List of World Heritage Sites in Malaysia

=== Art in Malaysia ===
- Art in Malaysia
  - List of Malaysian artists
- Cinema of Malaysia
- Literature of Malaysia
- Music of Malaysia
- Television in Malaysia

=== Sports in Malaysia ===
Sports in Malaysia

- Football in Malaysia
- Malaysia at the Olympics

== Education in Malaysia ==
Education in Malaysia

- Ministry of Education
- Ministry of Higher Education
- Malaysian Qualifications Framework
- List of schools in Malaysia
- List of post-secondary institutions in Malaysia
- List of universities in Malaysia
- Issues in Malaysian Education

Standardised examinations

- Ujian Pencapaian Sekolah Rendah (UPSR)
- Pentaksiran Tingkatan Tiga (PT3)
- Sijil Pelajaran Malaysia (SPM)
- Sijil Tinggi Persekolahan Malaysia (STPM)

== See also ==
Malaysia

- Index of Malaysia-related articles
- List of international rankings
- List of Malaysia-related topics
- Malay units of measurement
- Member state of the Commonwealth of Nations
- Member state of the United Nations
- Outline of Asia
- Outline of geography

== Notes ==
1. UMNO was deregistered in 1988 and the Prime Minister of Malaysia formed a new party known as United Malays National Organisation (Baru) on February 16, 1988. The term "Baru" or "New" was removed by a constitutional amendment on July of the same year.
2. The United Sabah Party (Parti Bersatu Sabah) was a member of Barisan Nasional from its establishment in 1985 until its withdrawal from the coalition in 1990. The party rejoined the coalition in 2002.
3. The Pan-Malaysian Islamic Party entered a coalition with the former Alliance Party in 1972 and subsequently joined the Barisan Nasional coalition when it was founded in 1974. It withdrew from the coalition in 1977.
