= Johor Bahru Central Business District =

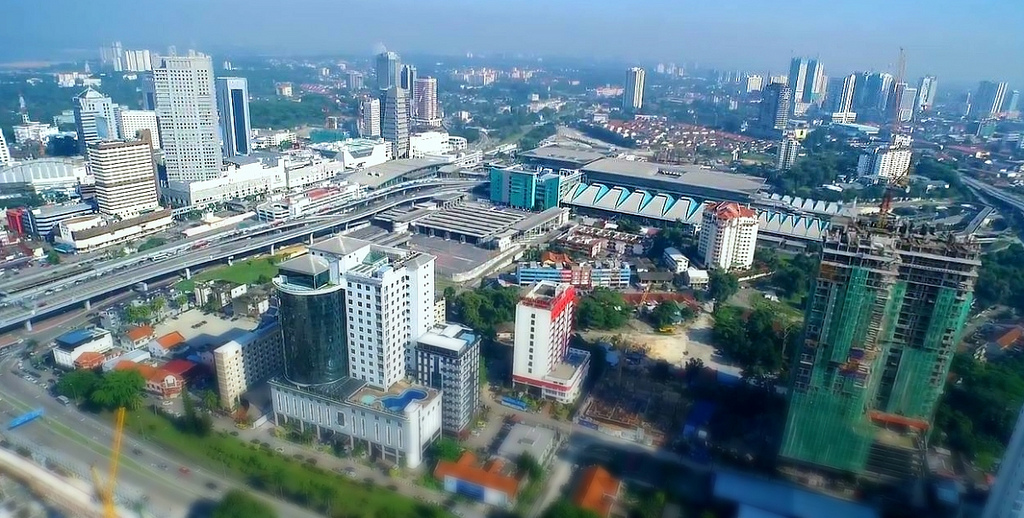
Johor Bahru Central Business District

The Johor Bahru Central Business District (Malay: Daerah Sentral Johor Bahru) or currently known as Ibrahim International Business District, is the commercial and political centre for the city of Johor Bahru in Johor, Malaysia.

JBCBD is officially defined as the area within the Johor Bahru Inner Ring Road comprising the city centre, Jalan Wong Ah Fook, Royal Johor Museum, the palace grounds, Sultanah Aminah Hospital and Southern Integrated Gateway.

== Centre for business ==
The area is a centre of business activity. All of the country's major banks have a presence in the city centre. Major shopping centres, such as Johor Bahru City Square and Komtar JBCC, are located within the area.

== Centre for politics and government ==
The area is also the seat of the state branches of the federal government as well as political parties' offices.

== Transport hub ==
The area also plays host to the customs, immigration and quarantine (CIQ) complex of the Malaysian Government on the Malaysia-Singapore Causeway, including Sultan Iskandar Building.

The Johor Bahru Sentral railway station is also located in the area. Johor Bahru–Singapore Rapid Transit System and Iskandar Malaysia Bus Rapid Transit will be the future public transport model located in the CBD.
