= Human trafficking in Papua New Guinea =

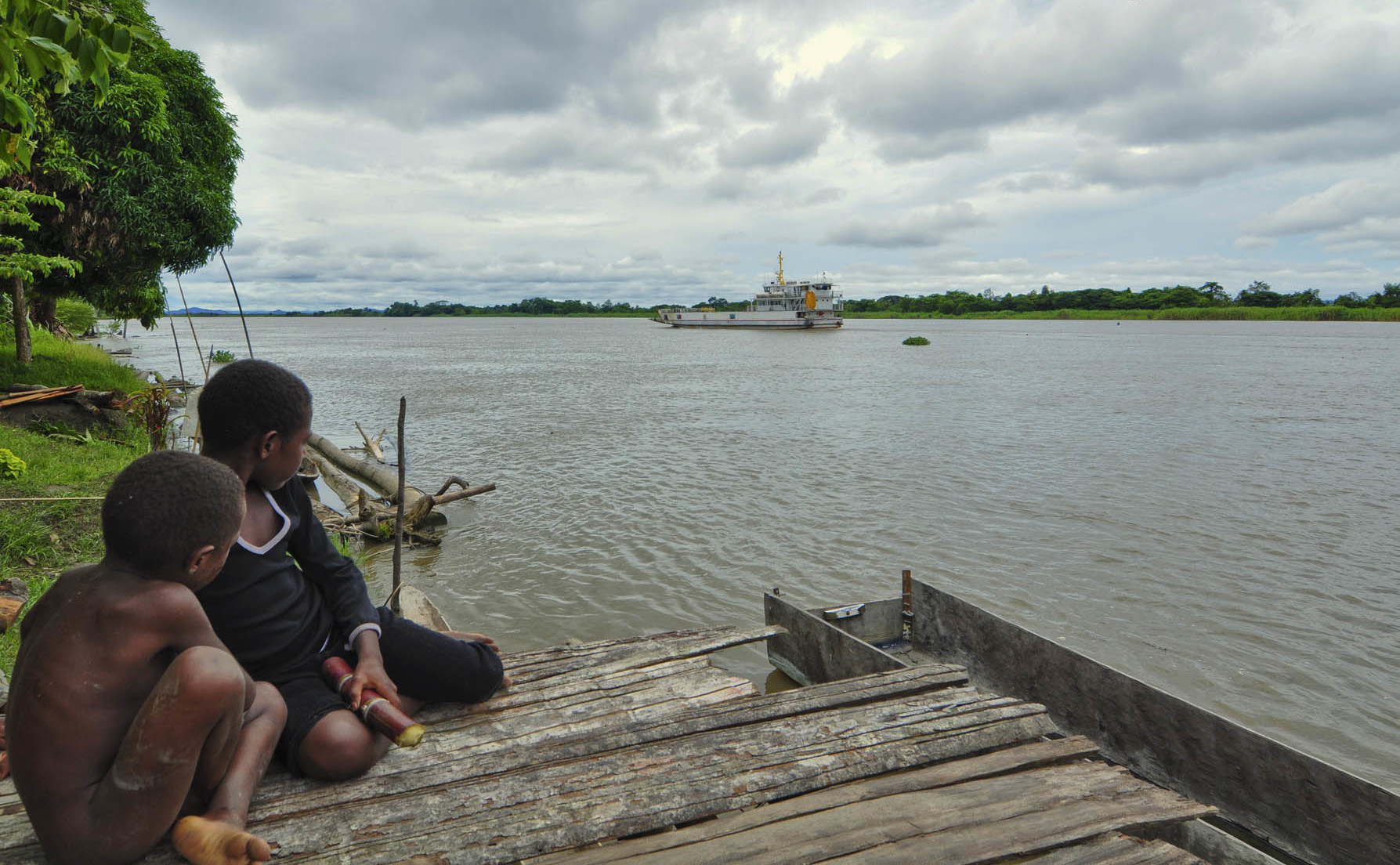
Papua New Guinea

In 2009, Papua New Guinea was a source, destination, and transit country for men, women, and children subjected to trafficking in persons, specifically forced prostitution and forced labor. Women and children were subjected to commercial sexual exploitation and involuntary domestic servitude; trafficked men were forced to provide labor in logging and mining camps. Children, especially young girls from tribal areas, were most vulnerable to being pushed into commercial sexual exploitation or forced labor by members of their immediate family or tribe. Families traditionally sold girls into forced marriages to settle their debts, leaving them vulnerable to involuntary domestic servitude, and tribal leaders trade the exploitative labor and service of girls and women for guns and political advantage. Young girls sold into marriage were often forced into domestic servitude for the husband's extended family. In more urban areas, some children from poorer families were prostituted by their parents or sold to brothels. Migrant women and teenage girls from Malaysia, Thailand, China, and the Philippines were subjected to forced prostitution, and men from China were transported to the country for forced labor.

In 2009, Asian crime rings, foreign logging companies, and foreign businessmen arranged for some women to voluntarily enter Papua New Guinea with fraudulently issued tourist or business visas. Subsequent to their arrival, the smugglers turned many of the women over to traffickers who transport them to logging and mining camps, fisheries, and entertainment sites where they are exploited in forced prostitution and involuntary domestic servitude. Foreign and local men are exploited for labor at mines and logging camps, where some receive almost no pay and are compelled to continue working for the company indefinitely through debt bondage schemes. Employers fostered workers’ greater indebtedness to the company by paying the workers sub-standard wages while charging them artificially inflated prices at the company store; the employees’ only option becomes to buy food and other necessities on credit. Government officials facilitated trafficking by accepting bribes to allow illegal immigrants to enter the country or to ignore victims forced into prostitution or labor, by receiving female trafficking victims in return for political favors, and by providing female victims in return for votes.

In 2009, the Government of Papua New Guinea did not fully comply with the minimum standards for the elimination of trafficking, and is not making significant efforts to do so. Despite the establishment of an interagency anti-trafficking committee, initial efforts to address forced child labor, and new programs to educate the public about trafficking, the government did not investigate any suspected trafficking offenses, prosecute or convict any trafficking offenders under the existing law of Papua New Guinea, or address allegations of officials complicit in human trafficking crimes.

The U.S. State Department's Office to Monitor and Combat Trafficking in Persons placed the country in "Tier 2 Watchlist" in 2017. By 2023, it had been moved to Tier 3.

Human trafficking remained a problem in PNG. Papua New Guinea was not a victim of significant efforts to meet minimum standards to end trafficking in the 2024 TIP Report, which placed PNG at Tier 3.The United States Department of State rated PNG as Tier 3 in the 2024 TIP Report, due to the lack of significant efforts to meet the minimum standards to end trafficking.

== Prosecution (2009) ==
The Government of Papua New Guinea showed negligible progress in its anti-trafficking law enforcement efforts during the year. No trafficking offenders were arrested or prosecuted during the year. Papua New Guinea does not have a comprehensive anti-trafficking law, and the penal code does not prohibit all forms of trafficking. Its criminal code does not specifically prohibit the trafficking of adults, but prohibits trafficking of children for commercial sexual exploitation and slavery. Penalties prescribed for trafficking children of up to life imprisonment are sufficiently stringent and commensurate with penalties prescribed for other serious crimes, such as rape. The Criminal Code prescribes various penalties for the forced prostitution of women. Low fines or sentences of up to two years’ imprisonment for these offenses, including holding a woman in a brothel against her will, are not sufficiently stringent. Prescribed penalties of up to seven years’ imprisonment for perpetrators who use fraud, violence, threats, abuse of authority, or drugs to procure a person for purposes of forced prostitution are sufficiently stringent and commensurate with penalties prescribed for other serious crimes. Labor laws prohibit forced labor and fraudulent employment recruiting. Prescribed penalties of up to two years’ imprisonment are not sufficiently stringent. The government showed no signs of investigating suspected trafficking offenses or prosecuting trafficking offenders. The Ministry of Justice continued to deliberate on a comprehensive anti-trafficking law, which will include implementation and monitoring guidance. Trafficking-related crimes in rural areas were referred to village courts, which administered customary law rather than criminal law, and resolved cases through restitution paid to the victim rather than criminal penalties assigned to the trafficking offender. Wealthy business people, politicians, and police officials who benefit financially from the operation of commercial sex establishments where trafficking victims are reportedly exploited were not prosecuted. Most law enforcement offices and government offices remained weak as the result of corruption, cronyism, a lack of accountability, and a promotion system based on patronage.

== Protection (2009) ==
The Government of Papua New Guinea maintained minimal efforts to protect and assist victims of trafficking during the reporting period. Due to severe resource and capacity constraints, it continued to rely on NGO's to identify and provide most services to potential victims. The government did not proactively identify trafficking victims among vulnerable populations, and did not regularly refer victims to NGO service providers. Potential victims who came to the attention of police could be jailed. Immigration inspectors at ports of entry who suspected foreigners would engage in illegal prostitution denied them entry without first determining whether they might be victims of sex trafficking. Officials informally referred crime victims to appropriate service providers, who reported that some of these appear to be victims of trafficking. The government contributed some funds to a shelter for victims of domestic violence in Port Moresby run by an NGO, which could provide shelter and legal aid to trafficking victims, although it did not knowingly do so during the year. The Public Solicitor's office could provide free legal advice and representation to victims. Women's shelters in Port Moresby and Lae could also house foreign and local victims. The Department of Health, with NGO assistance, continued to set up support centers in hospitals throughout the country to provide trafficking victims with counseling and short-term medical care. Survivors of internal trafficking often received customary compensation payments from the offender and were reluctant to notify police or bring additional criminal charges against their traffickers.

== Prevention (2009) ==
During the past year, the Papua New Guinean government made few efforts of its own to prevent trafficking during the reporting period. The government did, however, sustain partnerships with international organizations and NGOs to raise public awareness. The Constitutional Law Reform Commission (CLRC) took the lead in coordinating and communicating on trafficking issues, and established an inter-agency Anti-Trafficking Committee that included foreign government and NGO members. In partnership with IOM, the CLRC conducted the first National Human Trafficking and Smuggling Conference in March 2009, involving over 120 participants from both the government and NGO groups. Participants produced a resolution to ratify the 2000 UN TIP Protocol and harmonize the country's laws with bilateral law enforcement cooperation agreements already forged with surrounding countries. The Department of Labor addressed issues of child labor trafficking in partnership with the International Labour Organization as part of the TACKLE Project, and became a partner in the Government of Australia's efforts to prevent the labor trafficking of migrant workers from Papua New Guinea through the Pacific Seasonal Worker Pilot Scheme. Officials took steps to reduce the demand for commercial sex acts through public awareness campaigns against prostitution, the proliferation of pornographic material, and the country's growing HIV/AIDS epidemic. Papua New Guinea is not a party to the 2000 UN TIP Protocol.

== Continuation ==
In 2024, the US government reported that the authorities of Papua New Guinea were not fully completing the minumum required actions against human trafficking, were not reporting any investigations or convictions related to it, and were even deporting possible trafficking victims without screening them for trafficking signs; thus Papua New Guinea remains listed as "tier 3".

In 2025, the US government reported that Papua New Guinea government had taken some steps to address human trafficking, but was not making significant efforts to fully meet the minimum standards for the elimination of trafficking and thus, still remained on Tier 3. Their efforts include some investigations and prosecutions, adding trafficking to its training curriculum for investigators and prosecutors, and funding a non-profit organisation to provide services for victims of crimes, possibly including trafficking victims. However, the government failed to report convicting any traffickers and identifying or assisting trafficking victims due to inadequate screening efforts. The government also did not effectively prevent the inappropriate penalisation of potential victims, and conduct public awareness campaigns or administer systematic anti-trafficking training for its law enforcement officials.

== See also ==
- Human rights in Papua New Guinea
