= WCOA =

WCOA may refer to:

- WCOA (AM), a radio station (1370 AM) licensed to serve Pensacola, Florida, United States
- WCOA-FM, a radio station (88.5 FM) licensed to serve Johnstown, Pennsylvania, United States
- WJTQ, a radio station (100.7 FM) licensed to serve Pensacola, Florida, known as WCOA-FM from 1965 to 1975 and 2012 to 2014
- World Congress of Accountants
- Worst Cooks Of America
