= Heng Siew Chiang =

Heng Siew Chiang Sdn. Bhd.
- Native name: 王受長有限公司
- Type: Private Limited Company
- Industry: Conglomerate
- Founded: 1948; 78 years ago
- Founder: Heng Siew Chiang
- Headquarters: Tawau, Malaysia
- Area served: Southeast Asia
- Key people: Heng Siew Chiang (founder); Heng Tiang Shin (managing director); Wong Yin Yen (sales manageress)
- Products: Agriculture; Currency exchange; Plantation; Shipping; Wholesale and retail
- Website: Facebook page

Heng Siew Chiang Sdn. Bhd. (Chinese: 王受長有限公司) is a Malaysian company headquartered in Tawau, Malaysia. The company's operations include the wholesale and retail distribution of foodstuffs and household supplies, the import-export of agricultural commodities, currency exchange and plantations.

== History ==
=== 1948–89: Founding and incorporation ===
The company was founded in 1948 as "Chop Heng Siew Chiang" (Chinese: 王受長號) by the late Heng Siew Chiang (1918–1978) in Tawau, British North Borneo, following his emigration from Chaoyang, China. Originally a modest import-export trading house and grocery store on Dunlop Street, it expanded rapidly by leveraging the regional trade boom driven by surging global rubber and copra prices during the Korean War and relocated to Belian Street where it operated until the late 1980s. In 1977, the enterprise was formally incorporated under its current name, Heng Siew Chiang Sdn. Bhd. (Chinese: 王受長有限公司).

=== 1990–present: Change of managing director and expansions ===
In the early 1990s, Heng Tiang Shin, the founder's fourth son by his first wife, took over the family business as the managing director. Professionally qualified in the UK since 1983, he was admitted as an Associate Member of the Association of Chartered Certified Accountants (ACCA) in 1986 and became Fellow Member in 1991. He is currently a member of the Malaysian Institute of Accountants (MIA). Under his management, the company expanded its traditional trading operations into licensed currency exchange, transshipment trade, and agricultural plantations.

== Lawsuits and disputes ==
The company has been involved in several legal disputes.

One of the most notable cases occurred when it sued the Malaysian Government in the High Court after officers from the Paddy and Rice Regulatory Division (Malay: Bahagian Kawalselia Padi dan Beras) seized an HSC rice transshipment cargo in 2006, alleging that the shipment entered Malaysia without import licence. The Malaysian Government won the case on 20 October 2009 and the presiding judge ruled that the company imported rice from Vietnam without licence and was in violation of the Control of Padi and Rice Act 1994.

However, the High Court ruling was subsequently overturned by the Court of Appeal on 6 August 2012. The court unanimously held that the seizure was unlawful, as the cargo was intended for transshipment to the Philippines and Indonesia rather than importation into Malaysia. The decision was set aside, and damages were awarded to the company.
