= Perak Island =

Island of Malaysia

Native name: Pulau Perak
- Interactive map of Perak Island

Geography
- Location: Strait of Malacca
- Coordinates: 5°40′50″N 98°56′27″E
- Area: 0.12 km^{2} (0.046 sq mi)

Administration
- Malaysia
- State: Kedah
- District: Yan
- Mukim: Yan

Perak Island (Malay: Pulau Perak, Jawi: ڤولاو ڤيراق) is a small rocky island which constitutes the westernmost extremity of Malaysian territory. Its diameter is around 200 meters. The island is a sandstone rock that rises from the Strait of Malacca. It has a steep cliff with a height of more than 100m.

Perak Island is part of the Malaysian state of Kedah, administered under Yan District. It is expected to be designated as a marine protected area. The island is 158 km northwest of Penang, the nearest metropolitan area.

In March 2014, Malaysia Airlines Flight 370 disappeared off the Malaysian radar near the island.

On 25 July 2022, Sultan Sallehuddin of Kedah declared Perak Island as the new reference point for Islamic Calendar calculation, replacing Tanjung Chinchin in Langkawi.
