= North Guhuan Island =

Island in Malaysia

- Interactive map of North Guhuan Island

Geography
- Location: Sulu Sea
- Coordinates: 7°22′46″N 117°14′5″E

Administration
- Malaysia
- State: Sabah
- Division: Kudat
- District: Kudat

North Guhuan Island (Malay: Pulau Guhuan Utara) is a Malaysian island located in the Sulu Sea near Banggi Island on the state of Sabah. It is one of the extreme points of Malaysia.

== See also ==
- List of islands of Malaysia
