= Prostitution in Malaysia =

Prostitution in Malaysia is restricted in all states despite it being widespread in the country. Related activities such as soliciting and brothels are illegal. In the two states of Terengganu and Kelantan, Muslims convicted of prostitution may be punishable with public caning.

There were an estimated 150,000 prostitutes in Malaysia in 2014 and that the country's sex trade generated US$963 million.

== History ==
For 200 years, except in wartime, prostitution was only apparent in small areas of George Town, Ipoh, Johor Bahru, Kuantan and Kuala Lumpur, serving loggers, tin miners and sailors.

While Chinese prostitutes in British Malaya refused to service non-Chinese men, Japanese Karayuki-san prostitutes in British Malaya were open to non-Japanese men. Men from every race in British Borneo including natives, westerners, Chinese were clients of the Japanese prostitutes of Sandakan. in 1972 Tomoko Yamazaki published the film Sandakan Brothel No. 8 which raised awareness of karayuki-san and encouraged further research and reporting.

Japanese Karayuki-san prostitute Zendo Kikuyo who ended up in British Malaya (British Malaysia) said that Chinese men were her best customers until the Chinese boycott of Japanese products due to the Twenty-One Demands. The Japanese were then forced to rely on Indian customers. The Japanese smeared pig lard on their brothels to stop Malay Muslim men from coming near them and using love magic on them.

During the Japanese occupation of Malaya in the Second World War, the Japanese set up a number of brothels for their troops to "prevent the rape of local women by Japanese soldiers, to limit anti-Japanese resistance in the occupied area, to protect the soldiers from venereal disease and to avoid international disgrace". Many local women between 17 and 28 were forced to work in brothels, employed as what were euphemistically termed "comfort women".

Starting at the end of the 20th century, prostitution has spread over the rest of Malaysia, particularly in the form of massage parlours, and "health centres".

== Foreign prostitutes in Malaysia ==
As of 2015, while the prostitutes were previously mostly locals, there had been an influx of foreign sex workers. Prostitutes from China, Myanmar, Vietnam, Thailand, Laos, and Cambodia now outnumber locals.

Most of the women trafficked from China to Thailand and Malaysia are from ethnic minorities like the Dai ethnicity from areas like the from Xishuangbanna Dai Autonomous Prefecture in Yunnan province and they are trafficked by men of their own ethnicity. The Dai people are related to Thai people.

In 2012, the Anti-Vice, Gambling and Secret Societies divisions of the police arrested 12,234 prostitutes throughout the country, of which 9,830 were foreign nationals, including 5,165 Chinese, 2,009 Thais and 1,418 Indonesians.

In 2015, Malaysian police announced that half of the arrested prostitutes in a police raid in Kuala Lumpur were Iranians. Some Iranian women in Malaysia became prostitutes due to financial problems.

== Malaysian sex tourists in foreign countries ==
South Korean Yang Hyun-suk, head of K-Pop YG Entertainment was accused by South Korean media (Straight program by Munhwa Broadcasting Corporation) of offering local prostitutes from South Korea to male foreign investors including the Malaysian Chinese businessman Low Taek Jho. Another woman interviewed in the same program said a YG subsidiary YGX executive brought along a Thai man who raped her.

== Legal situation ==
There are no federal laws against prostitution but there are laws against related activities. Section 372 of the Penal Code criminalises soliciting in any place and living on the earnings of a prostitute. The latter is applied against those who run brothels.

The Prevention and Control of Infectious Diseases Act 1988 adds an offence of exposing another person to the risk of HIV infection.

Local health regulations prevent health and beauty establishments (which includes massage parlours) from employing sex-workers.

Various other laws such as those against vagrancy are also used against sex-workers.

=== Kelantan ===
The Sharia Criminal Offences Act, which brings Sharia law into force, is in effect in Kelantan. Sharia law allows fines and public whipping or caning for "any woman who prostitutes herself". Buying of sex is also forbidden. However Deputy Prime Minister Dr Ahmad Zahid Hamidi suggests this may only apply to Muslims.

== Kuala Lumpur ==
Kuala Lumpur has a number of red-light districts where street prostitution, massage parlours and brothels can be found.

The most upmarket area for prostitution, and probably the best known, is Bukit Bintang. While the more downmarket is the RLD at Lorong Haji Taib where Indian, Chinese, and local prostitutes operate. Close by is the Chow Kit area where transgender prostitutes ply at night.

Changkat Bukit Bintang, Chow Kit, Jalan Alor, Jalan Hicks, and Jalan Thamibipilly in the Brickfields area are known red-light districts. Street walkers operate around Jalan Petaling. Another well-known place among locals is Desa Sri Hartamas located in the Segambut district, where massage parlours can also be found.

In the Klang Valley, Chinese, Vietnamese, Thais, and Cambodians work as Guest Relations Officers (GROs) in the karaoke and bars. After being brought a few drinks they will negotiate a price for sex. Indonesians work as dancers/prostitutes in the Dangdut Pubs. African prostitutes try to pick up customers outside nightclubs in Bukit Bintang, Jalan Sultan Ismail, and Jalan Imbi. There are also a number of escort agencies.

== Johor Bahru ==
Johor Bahru is notorious as a sleazy border town since the 1980s. The underground sex services has a huge demand from foreign migrant workers and Singaporeans. Known red light districts in Johor Bahru are Johor Bahru City Square, Wong Ah Fook Street, Jalan Meldrum, Kotaraya, and Taman Sentosa.

== Sex trafficking ==
Demand for prostitution has created a problem of people trafficking for the purpose of forced prostitution from China and Vietnam, even as far as Uganda. A 2009 study by a church estimated that there were 30–32,000 victims of trafficking in the Sabah area alone. Victims are detained without access to legal, medical or social services in 'protective shelters'. After 90 days they are usually deported.

Child prostitution and trafficking is also a problem.

The United States Department of State Office to Monitor and Combat Trafficking in Persons ranks Malaysia as a 'Tier 2 Watch List' country.

=== Malaysian prostitutes in foreign countries ===
In 2004 the United States Department of State reported that some Malaysian women and girls had been trafficked for sexual purposes, mostly to Singapore, Macau, Hong Kong, and Taiwan, but also to Japan, Australia, Canada, and the United States.
