= Wong Ah Fook Street =

Road in Johor Bahru, Johor, Malaysia

Federal Route 3
- Wong Ah Fook Street
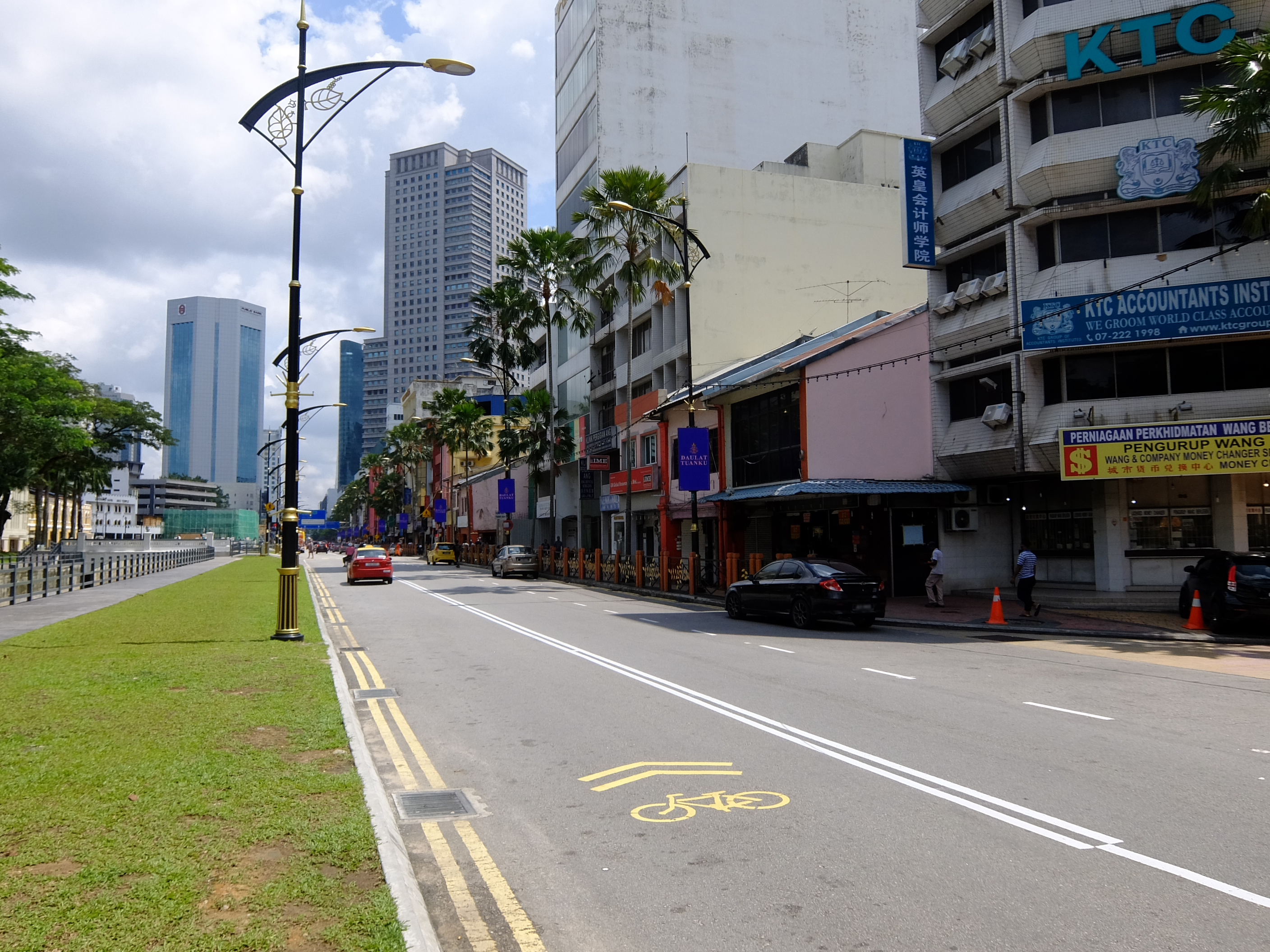
- Jalan Wong Ah Fook in 2016

Route information
- Maintained by Malaysian Public Works Department

Major junctions
- South end: J1 Iskandar Coastal Highway
- J1 Iskandar Coastal Highway; FT 1 Skudai Highway FT 3 / AH18 Johor Bahru–Kota Tinggi Highway (Tebrau Highway)
- North end: FT 1 Skudai Highway

Location
- Country: Malaysia
- Primary destinations: Kota Tinggi

Highway system
- Highways in Malaysia; Expressways; Federal; State

Wong Ah Fook Street (Malay: Jalan Wong Ah Fook), Federal Route 1 & 3, is a major one-way road in Johor Bahru, Johor, Malaysia. It is located in Johor Bahru's central business district and is one of the busiest roads in the city.

It was named after Wong Ah Fook, a Chinese man who came to Singapore in 1854 and established himself in building construction and other businesses. The town of Johor Bahru was founded in 1855 by Wong Ah Fook and Temenggong Daeng Ibrahim.

== Attractions ==
Meldrum Walk, Johor Bahru City Square and Komtar JBCC.

== Junction lists ==
The entire route is located in Johor Bahru District, Johor.

Legend:

- I/C - Interchange, I/S - Intersection, RSA - Rest and service area, OBR - Overhead bridge restaurant, R/R - Restaurant and rest plaza, L/B - Layby, V/P - Vista point, TN - tunnel, T/P - Toll plaza, BR - Bridge
- C - Cloverleaf, S - Stack, T-A - Trumpet-A, T-B - Trumpet-B, DT - Directional-T/Y, SDT - Semi-Directional-T/Y, P-Y - Partial-Y, D - Diamond, P-C - Partial cloverleaf, D-D - Diverging diamond, D-R - Direct ramp

Location	km	mi	Name	Destinations	Notes
Johor Bahru			Through to J1 Iskandar Coastal Highway		
Johor Bahru			Legaran Segget		
Johor Bahru			Jalan Siu Koon I/S	Jalan Siu Koon – Balai Polis Sentral	Entry only
Johor Bahru			Jalan Segget, Jalan Siu Nam I/S	Jalan Segget – Bazzar Karat JB, Pesiaran Meldrum	4 way junctions, Jalan Segget walk only, Exit only for Jalan Siu Nam
Johor Bahru			Jalan Siu Chin I/S	Jalan Siu Chin – Pesiaran Meldrum	Exit only
Johor Bahru			Jalan Ungku Puan I/S	Jalan Ungku Puan – Jalan Trus, Jalan Duke, Jalan Abdullah Ibrahim, Galleria @ Kotaraya; Persada Johor, Sultan Ibrahim Building	Junctions, walk only
Johor Bahru			Jalan Stesen I/S	Jalan Stesen – Skudai Highway	T-junctions
Johor Bahru			Johor Bahru City Square		
Johor Bahru			Wisma HYH		
Johor Bahru			Public Bank		
Johor Bahru			Komtar JBCC		
Johor Bahru			Amari Johor Bahru, SuaSana		
Johor Bahru			Fives Hotel		
Johor Bahru			Shell L/B		
Johor Bahru			Jalan Sulaiman I/S	Jalan Sulaiman – Jalan Trus	Exit only
Johor Bahru			Skudai Highway	FT 1 Skudai Highway – JB Sentral	
Johor Bahru			Jalan Gereja Exit	Jalan Gereja – Jalan Trus	
Johor Bahru			Landmark I/C	FT 1 Skudai Highway – Tampoi, Iskandar Puteri, Skudai, Senai, Senai International Airport, Kulai, JB Sentral, Johor Bahru City Square	Cloverleaf interchange
Johor Bahru			Continue as FT 3 / AH18 Johor Bahru–Kota Tinggi Highway (Tebrau Highway)		
1.000 mi = 1.609 km; 1.000 km = 0.621 mi: Concurrency terminus; Incomplete access; Route transition
