= Southern Integrated Gateway =

Land border control in Johor, Malaysia

Coordinates: 1°27′49″N 103°45′51″E

- Malay: Gerbang Selatan Bersepadu; Tamil: ஒருங்கிணைந்த தென்மண்டல நுழைவாயில்
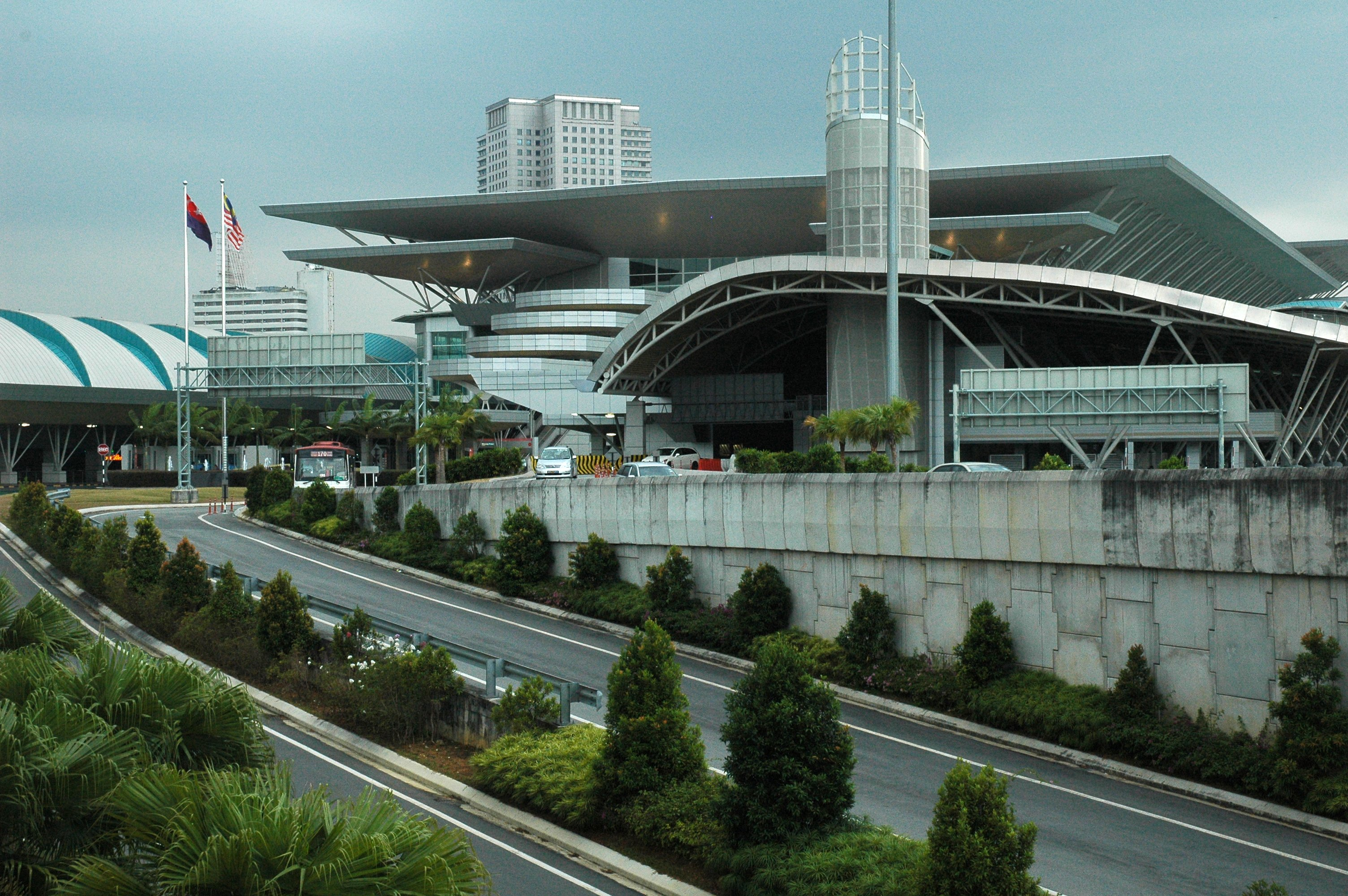
- Interactive map of the Southern Integrated Gateway area

General information
- Type: Border control
- Location: Johor Bahru, Johor, Malaysia
- Groundbreaking: 14 February 2003; 23 years ago
- Construction started: 2 December 2003; 22 years ago
- Opened: 16 December 2008; 17 years ago

The Southern Integrated Gateway (Malay: Gerbang Selatan Bersepadu) refers to a complex at Bukit Chagar, Johor Bahru, Johor, Malaysia incorporating the city's main railway station, JB Sentral, and a customs, immigration, and quarantine complex (CIQ), the Sultan Iskandar Building (Malay: Bangunan Sultan Iskandar), named after Almarhum Sultan Iskandar ibni Almarhum Sultan Ismail of Johor.

The station and complex are the main transportation hub of Johor Bahru and southern Peninsular Malaysia. The Malaysian Public Works Department was responsible for the design and construction of the project; Gerbang Perdana Sdn Bhd was the main contractor. This project is part of the Iskandar Malaysia development corridor project.

The CIQ complex was opened to vehicular traffic on 16 December 2008. As of October 2010, the JB Sentral railway station entered operation and service to the old Johor Bahru railway station ceased.

== Benefits of the project ==
The project sought to improve the traffic flow within Johor Bahru Central Business District. The regional road network was enhanced by the linking of the CIQ complex to the North–South Expressway via the Johor Bahru Inner Ring Road. The project also improved the transportation links between Johor Bahru and Singapore.

The project was intended to also attract Singaporean tourists to Johor Bahru and the rest of Johor because of the improved transportation link, which increases convenience and decreases travelling time.

== History ==
=== Events ===
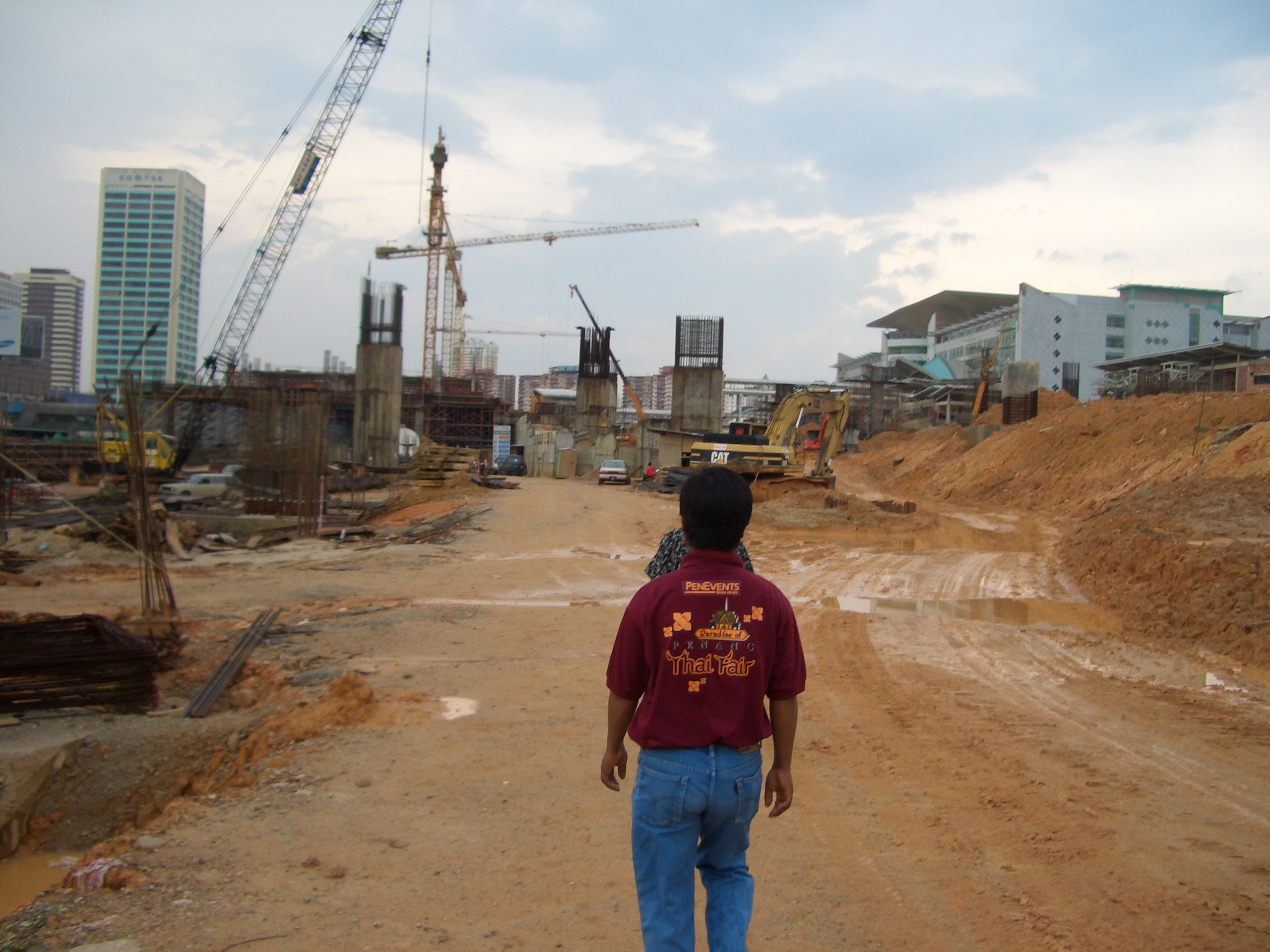
Construction of the road leading to highway

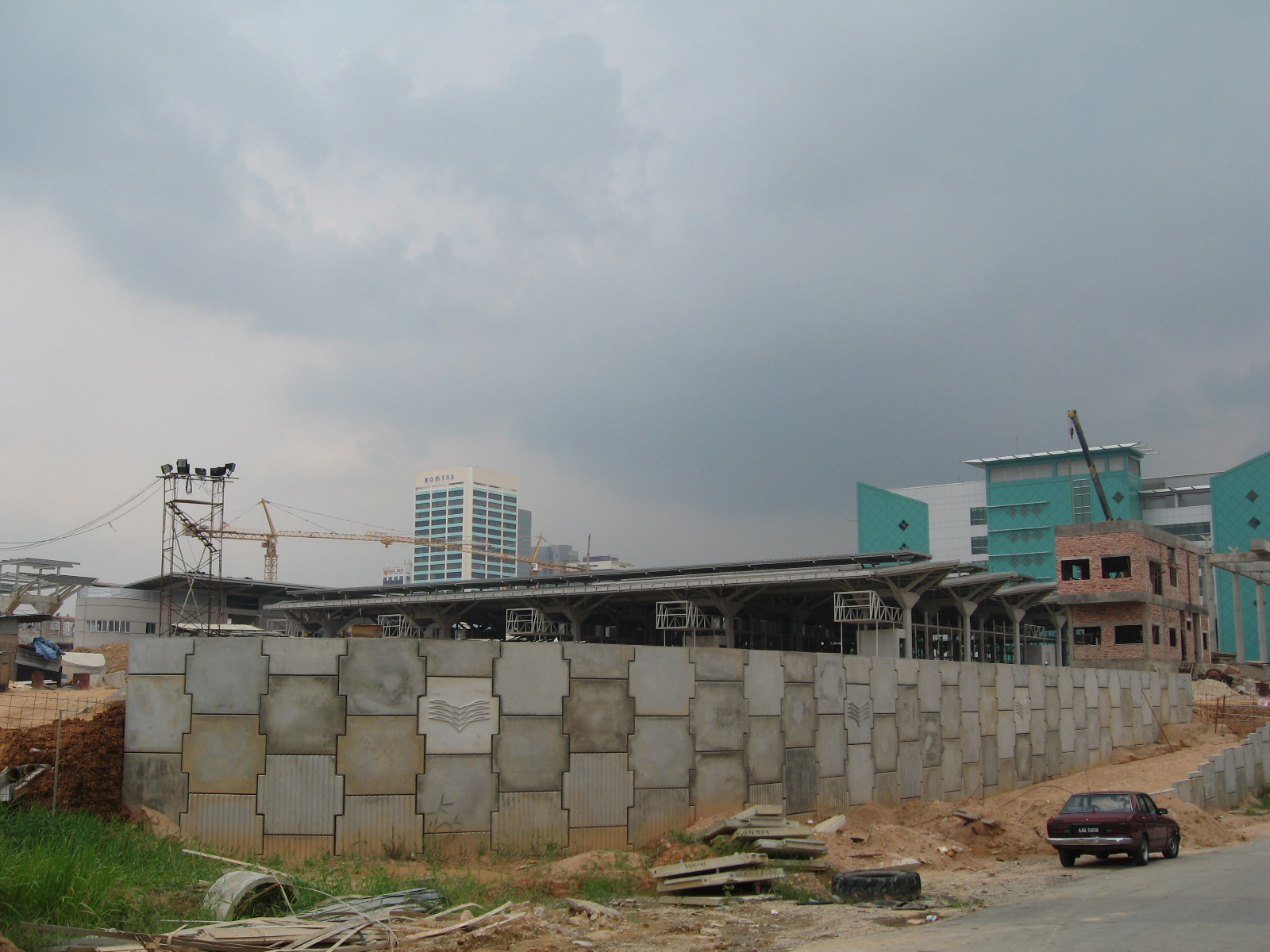
Bangunan Sultan Iskandar–Customs, Immigration and Quarantine centre under construction in 2006

Start	End	Event
End of 2002		The new CIQ complex is proposed.
Early 2003		The Lumba Kuda flats and other structures including Kampung Ungku Mohsin and Bukit Cagar recreational park are demolished.
14 February 2003		The Southern Integrated Gateway is officially launched by Tun Dr Mahathir Mohamad, then Prime Minister of Malaysia.
2 December 2003		Construction of CIQ complex begins.
10 March 2006		The pilings for the new scenic bridge are completed.
12 April 2006		The construction of the new Tanjung Puteri road bridge replacing Malaysian side of causeway was cancelled.
26 April 2006		The 250-million-Ringgit eight-lane straight elevated permanent link from Causeway to the new CIQ complex in Bukit Chagar was proposed by the Ministry of Works and Gerbang Perdana.
30 July 2006		The Johor state government announces plans to build a new Johor Bahru Maglev monorail transit system. It will connect JB Sentral to Tebrau City in the east and JB Sentral to Skudai in the west.
18 January 2007		The construction of the short-term-access temporary road begins.
1 June 2007	30 June 2007	Beam launching works for Tanjung Puteri Bridge as part of the short-term access.
1 July 2007		The new Custom, Immigration and Quarantine Complex building is occupied by the user departments.
Mid-2008		The Bukit Cagar flats are demolished.
1 December 2008		The new Custom, Immigration and Quarantine (CIQ) Complex building is officially named the "Sultan Iskandar Complex" by the Sultan of Johor. The customs complex was opened to cars and motorcycles entering Johor Bahru on the same day.
16 December 2008		The Sultan Iskandar Complex is opened to all road traffic.
21 October 2010		JB Sentral opens for railway operations.
12 November 2011		New 8 lane straight road opened to all road traffic

== Main components ==
=== Sultan Iskandar Building ===
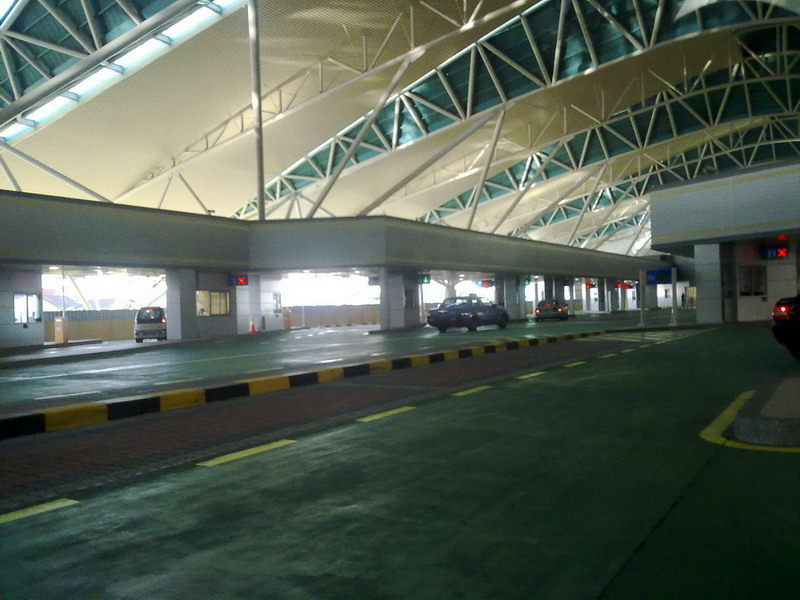
Immigration checkpoint to enter Johor Bahru

See also Sultan Iskandar Building

=== JB Sentral transportation hub ===
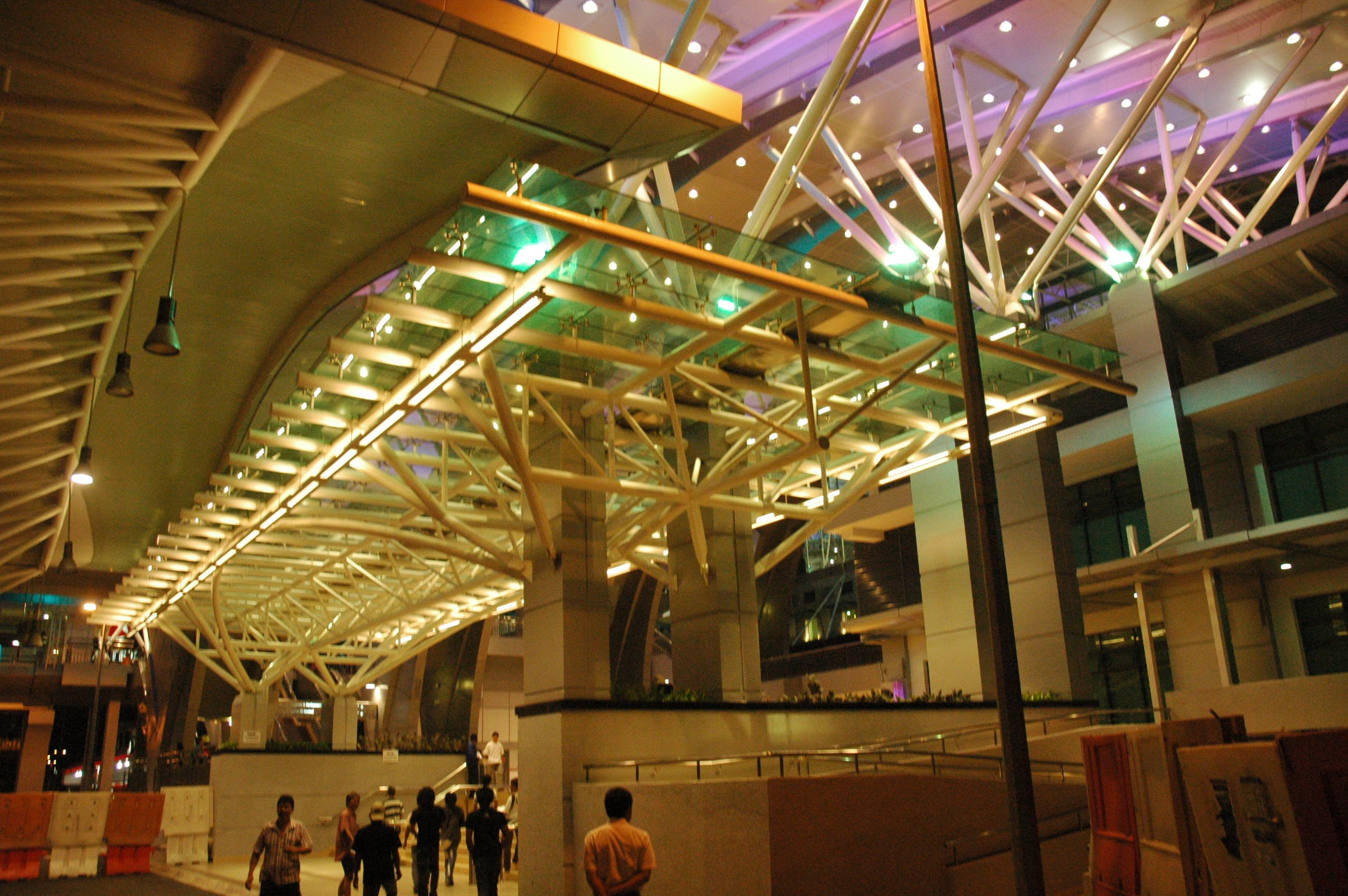
Entrance to JB Sentral, lit at night.

Johor Bahru Sentral railway station or in short form JB Sentral is the transport hub for Johor Bahru, similar to KL Sentral in Kuala Lumpur. The total area of JB Sentral is 79,000 square metres (850,000 sq ft), almost two times larger than KL Sentral (42,000 m^{2} or 450,000 sq ft). The hub has a KTM railway station (opened on 21 October 2010) and a bus station, which occupies an area of 9,500 square metres (102,000 sq ft). The bus station is expected to handle approximately 15,000 bus passengers per hour, reducing traffic congestion at the 20-year-old Larkin Terminal Station. There are 2,000 parking spaces allocated at JB Sentral.

The trains operate in a north–south orientation. The site's western boundary is constrained by the Caltex petrol station abutting the rail track fencing; Jalan Jim Quee to the east has a platform level up to 8 metres (26 ft) higher, which slopes to the rail tracks.

The terminal is designed to operate six rail lines and four island platforms (530 m × 8 m or 1,739 ft × 26 ft) on a straight alignment. The JB Sentral building is designed to fit this narrow site by placing the passenger hall and ticketing offices directly above the rail tracks, with escalators and lifts providing access to the rail platforms below.

A pedestrian bridge connects JB Sentral to Johor Bahru City Square the Tun Abdul Razak Complex.

A new station for the Johor Bahru–Singapore Rapid Transit System that connects to the Singapore MRT at Woodlands North will be built at Bukit Chagar located north of JB Sentral by 2024.

=== Links to other roads ===
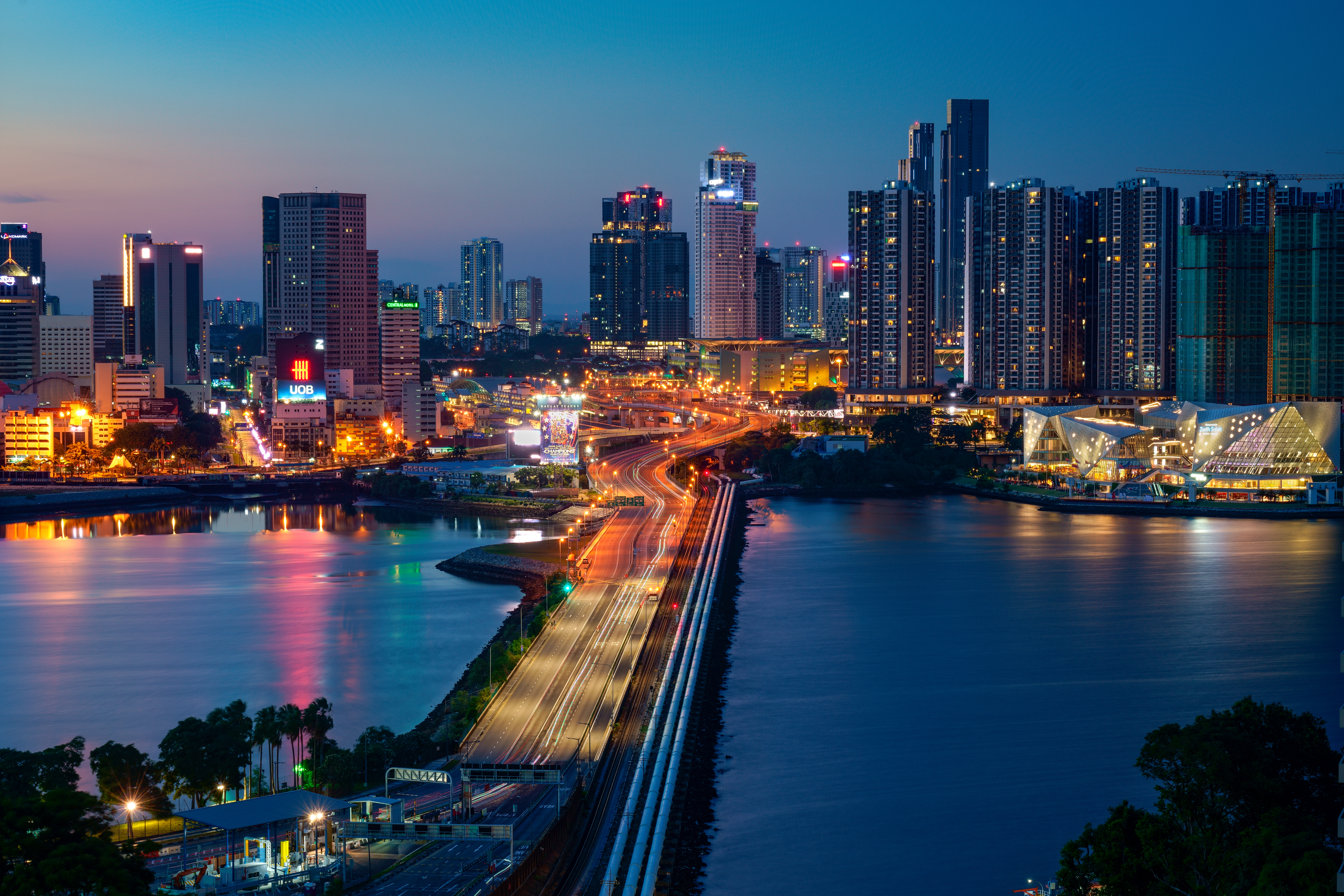
Johor–Singapore Causeway facing Johor Bahru.

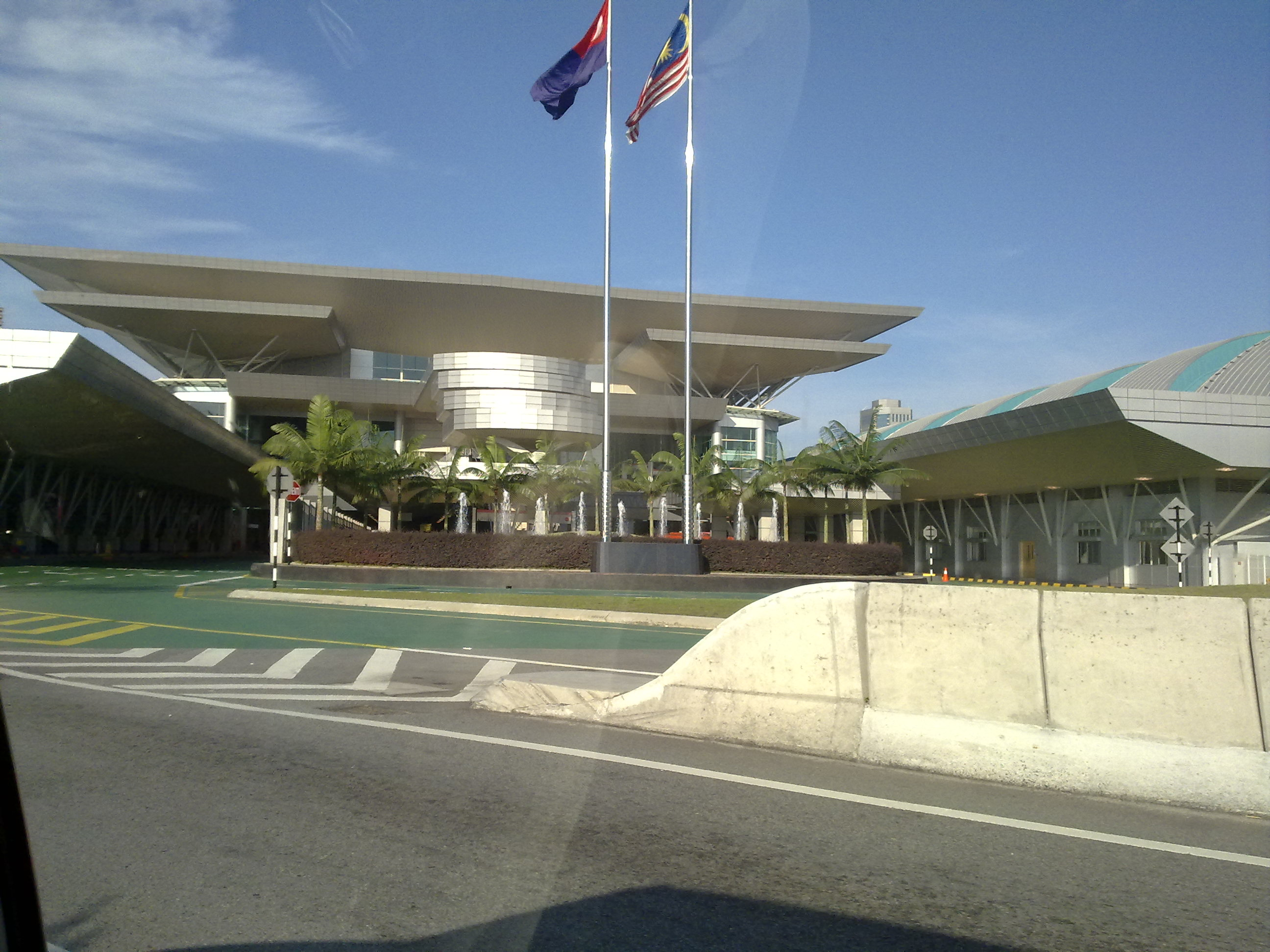
Bangunan Sultan Iskandar, seen from car heading towards Jalan Lingkaran Dalam

The 250-million-Ringgit, eight-lane, straight elevated permanent link on the originally planned flyover bridge is a main road from the Johor–Singapore Causeway to the new CIQ complex. The old checkpoint for light vehicles, the Tanjung Puteri Customs Complex for heavy vehicles, and the old checkpoint bridge were demolished starting in May 2009.

There is a flyover connecting this project to the Johor Bahru Inner Ring Road and a new highway, the Johor Bahru Eastern Dispersal Link, which links the Southern Integrated Gateway to the interchange of the North–South Expressway Southern Route near Pandan.

The construction of the new Permas Jaya second bridge commenced in 2008.

== Critical reception ==
On its opening day on 16 December 2008, motorists entering Malaysia from Singapore were greeted by a plague of problems such as long queues and traffic confusion. Public transport was also badly affected; some commuters said that crossing the causeway took them almost two hours, rather than 15 minutes as it had with the old checkpoint. (Although the new checkpoint boasts 76 lanes for cars, these 76 lanes split from only one lane that enters the complex. This is because there are only two lanes entering the complex. Of these, one is for cars, and one is for buses and other vehicles.) There was also reportedly a lack of signs and policemen, causing many motorists to get lost within the complex.

In January 2009, a notice issued to pedestrians walking to the customs complex caused confusion among pedestrians and the Singapore custom authorities. Government officials have noted the danger of walking into the customs complex, and proposed a ban on pedestrians. This led to a critical response from pedestrians, who complained of the massive jams that they often faced, as well as noting that the structure of the road leading up to the complex was extremely dangerous and unsuitable for pedestrians. Pedestrians entering Malaysia are required to walk an additional 1 kilometre of arduous uphill terrain after crossing the causeway as the current Sultan Iskandar Building is located further away from the old CIQ Complex which used to be just right after the causeway, thereby bringing the total walking distance to 2 kilometers.

== Occupants of the Sultan Iskandar CIQ Complex and JB Sentral ==
- Department of Immigration Malaysia
- Royal Customs Department Malaysia
- Malaysian Road Transport Department
- PLUS Expressway Berhad
- Royal Malaysian Police
- Keretapi Tanah Melayu
- Veterinary Service Department
- Ministry of Home Security Affairs
- Malaysian Timber Industrial Board
- Malaysian Fisheries Development Authority
- Federal Agricultural Marketing Authority
- Johor's State Land and Mines Office
- Perhilitan
- Johor's State Agriculture Department
- Johor's State Health Department
- Majlis Bandaraya Johor Bahru (MBJB)
- Tourism Malaysia

== See also ==
- South Johor Economic Region
