= Legaran Segget =

Pedestrian walkway in Johor Bahru, Malaysia

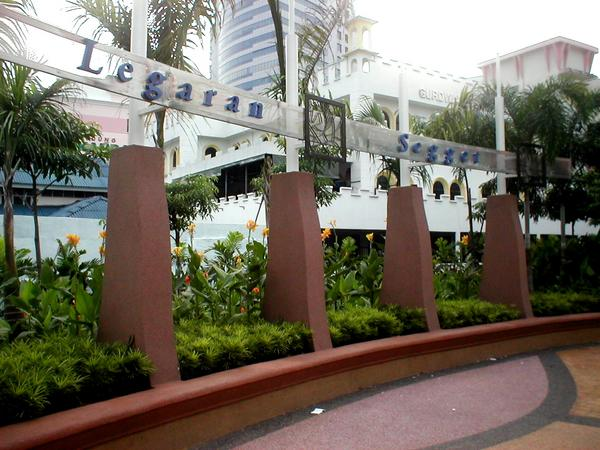
Legaran Segget

Legaran Segget is a pedestrian walkway in Johor Bahru, Johor, Malaysia which is a covered-up river, Segget River. It is an urban renewal project by the Johor Bahru City Council.

== History ==
The project which was completed in 2005 costs approximately RM 6 million. In November 2018, the Heritage Cornerstone was erected at the walkway to celebrate Johor's diverse cultural legacy.

== Architecture ==
Legaran Segget has several fountains along the walkway.
