= National symbols of Malaysia =

The national symbols of Malaysia are symbols that represent the government and culture of Malaysia. There are generally five recognised elements: the national emblem, national anthem, national flag, national flower and national language. The first official symbols, flag and anthem were adopted in 1957. In addition, other traditional symbols are often cited, such as the national bird, national animal and national craft. There are also popularly recognised symbols including the national airline, national colour, national dress, national sport, national poetry and national mausoleum.

== Flag ==
Flag of Malaysia – Jalur Gemilang (Stripes of Glory)

The national flag of Malaysia, also known as the Stripes of Glory (Jalur Gemilang), is composed of a field of 14 alternating red and white stripes along the fly and a blue canton bearing a crescent and a 14-point star known as the Bintang Persekutuan (Federal Star). The 14 stripes, of equal width, represent the equal status in the federation of the 13 member states and the federal territories, while the 14 points of the star represent the unity among these entities. The crescent represents Islam, the country's state religion; the blue canton symbolises the unity of the Malaysian people; the yellow of the star and crescent is the royal colour of the Malay rulers, the red stripes represent bravery and the white stripes represent purity.

The Malaysian flag is similar in design to the flag of the United States of America which has 13 horizontal alternating red and white stripes with 50 stars. There was a row of confusion in Kansas in September 2017 when Munir Zanial, a Muslim Malaysian aerospace engineer, hosted a party to celebrate Malaysian Independence Day and the end of Ramadan. The Malaysian flag was prominently displayed, which onlookers believed was an American flag defaced with symbols of the Islamic State. The FBI was notified which soon resolved the misunderstanding.

== Anthem ==
The Malaysian national anthem is called Negaraku (literally "My Country") which was adopted at the time of Malaya's independence from the United Kingdom in 1957. The tune was originally used as the state anthem of Perak, "Allah Lanjutkan Usia Sultan".

== Coat of arms ==
Coat of arms of Malaysia

The coat of arms of Malaysia (Jata Negara Malaysia) comprises a shield or escutcheon, two tigers for supporters, a crescent and fourteen-pointed star for a crest and a motto. The motto of the arms, located below the shield, consists of a banner with the phrase "Unity is Strength" (Bersekutu Bertambah Mutu). As the coat of arms descended from that of the Federated Malay States under British colonial rule, it resembles European heraldic designs.

== Language ==
Malaysian Malay (Malay: Bahasa Melayu Malaysia) or Malaysian (Bahasa Malaysia) is a standardized form of the Malay language used in Malaysia and also used in Brunei and Singapore (as opposed to the variety used in Indonesia, which is referred to as the "Indonesian" language). It is spoken by much of the Malaysian population, although most learn a vernacular Malay dialect or another native language first. In 1957, Article 152 of Malaysia's Constitution described "Malay" (Bahasa Melayu) as the national language without any further definition. However, the term bahasa Malaysia (lit. 'Malaysian Language') became more popular even in administrative contexts. Between 1986 and 2007, the official term Bahasa Melayu was revived as the standard name. In 2007, to recognize the multiethnicity of Malaysian, the government announced that the preferred name as bahasa Malaysia.

== Flower ==
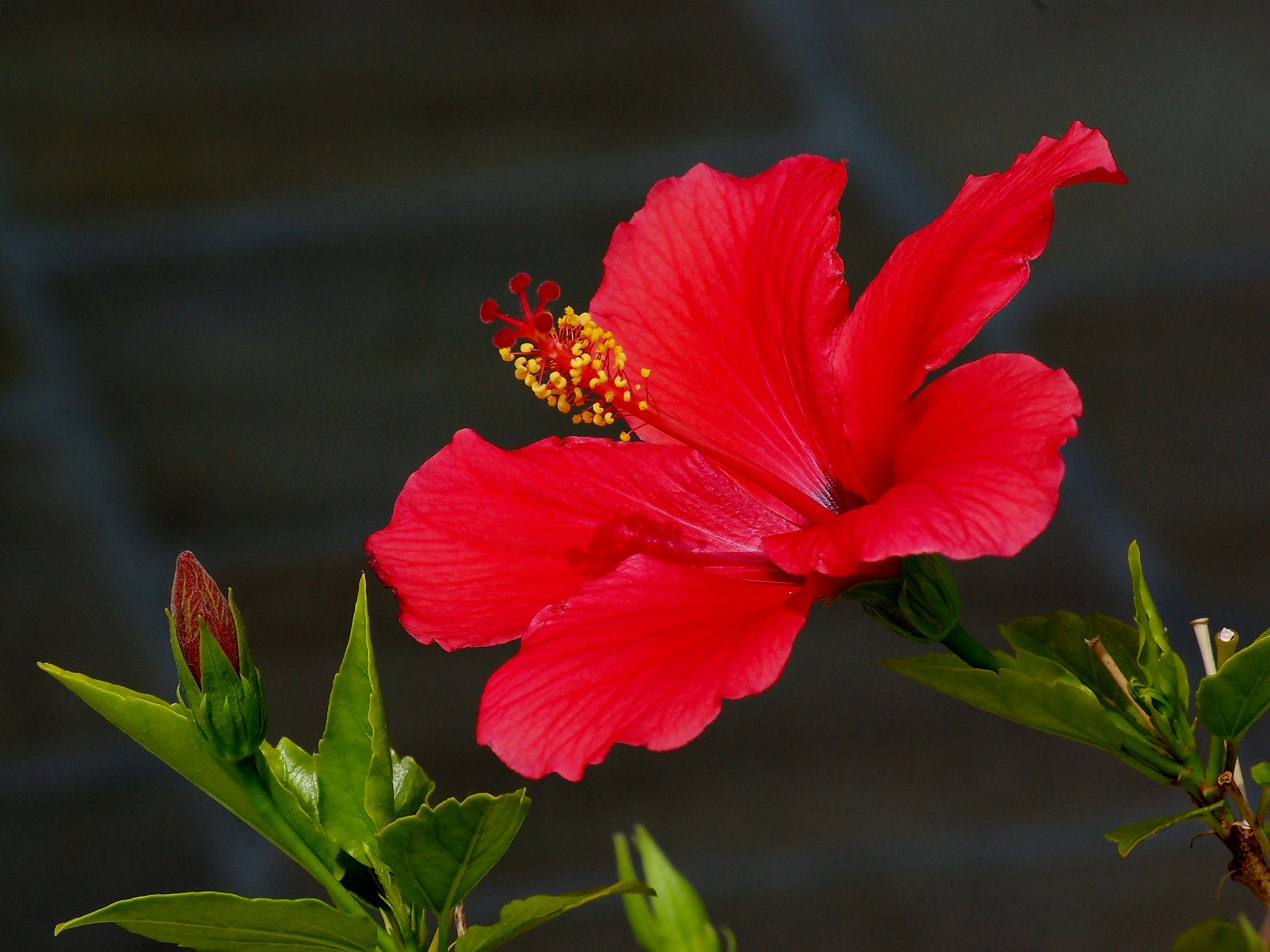
Malaysian national flower

In 1960, the then Prime Minister Tunku Abdul Rahman Putra Al-Haj declared Hibiscus × rosa-sinensis (variously known by common names like Chinese hibiscus, China rose, shoeblack plant, or bung raya in Malay) as the national flower. The flower is a hybrid of two species, Hibiscus cooperi and H. kaute.
