= Military history of Malaysia =

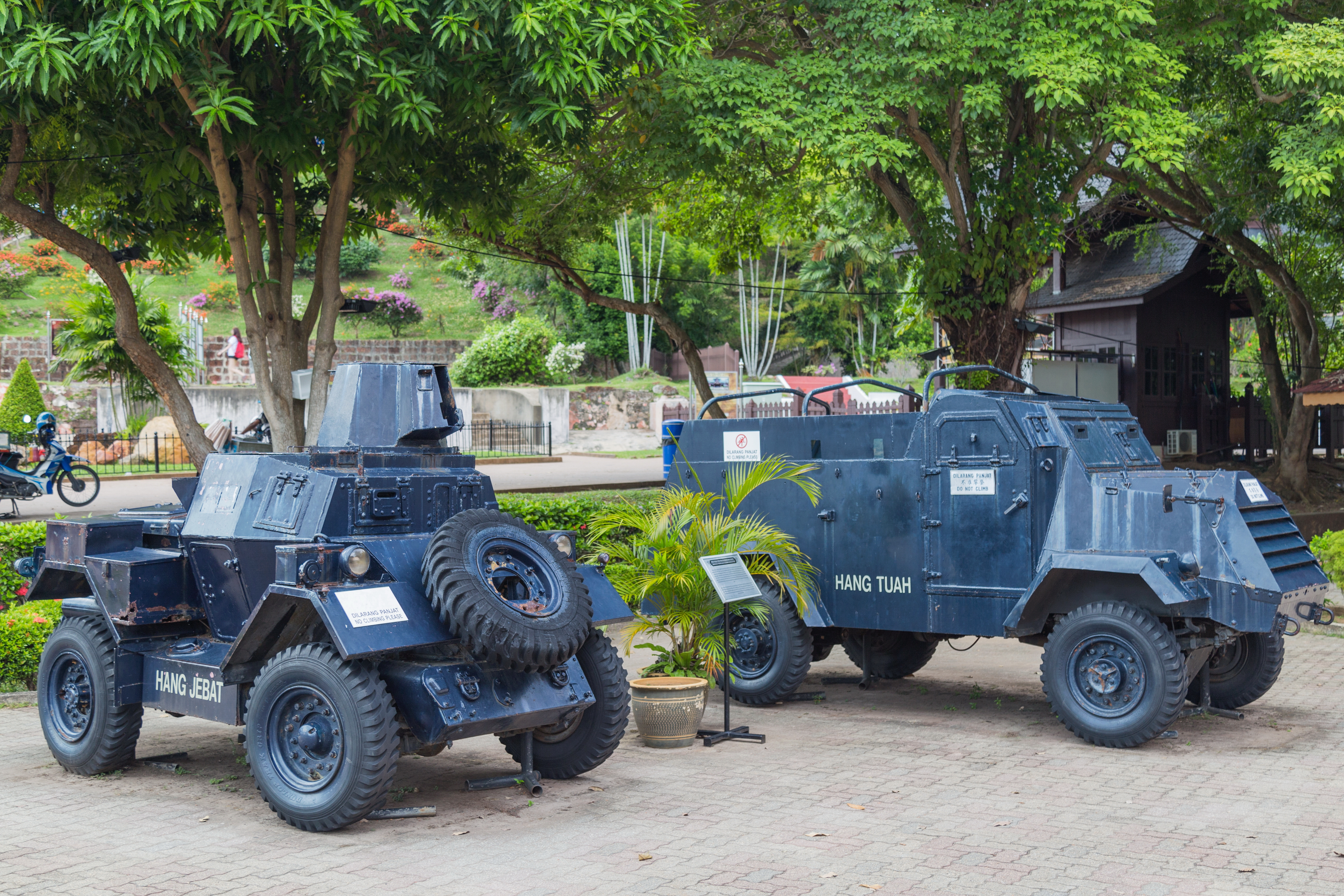
Armoured vehicles from the Malayan Emergency era in Malacca City.

Malaysia's armed forces, which encompasses three major branches, originate from the formation of local military forces in the first half of the 20th century, during British colonial rule of Malaya and Singapore prior to Malaya's independence in 1957. The branches have undergone several restructuring, but fundamentally includes the army, navy and air force.

== Malaysian Army ==
The first military in Malaysia can be traced back to the Malay States Volunteer Rifles which existed from 1915 to 1936. The birth of the Malaysian Army came about when the Federal Council of Federated Malay States eventually passed the Malay Regiment Bill on 23 January 1933. This allowed the initial recruitment of 25 males for the First Experimental Malay Company on 1 March 1933. Major G. McI. S. Bruce of the Lincolnshire Regiment was the first Commanding Officer.

By 1 January 1935, the Experimental Company became The Malay Regiment with a complement of 150 men. A battalion was formed on 1 January 1938 and eventually a second battalion on 1 December 1941,.

The 1st Bn Malay Regiment was famous for its successful defence of Opium Hill (Malay: Bukit Chandu), Singapore, in the Battle of Pasir Panjang during the Battle of Singapore. The Battle of Opium Hill on 14 February 1942 involved 42 soldiers commanded by Lt. Adnan Bin Saidi who defended their position against attack from the 18th Division of the Japanese Imperial Army under Lt. Gen. Renya Mutaguchi. After World War II and during the Malayan Emergency, the number of battalions was increased to 7 in the early 1950s.

The Kor Armor DiRaja (Malay; English: Royal Armoured Corps) can trace its roots to the formation on 1 September 1952 of the Federation Reconnaissance Squadron. It was later merged with the Federation Regiment to form the Federation Reconnaissance Corps. The name underwent a few transformations from the Malaysian Reconnaissance Corps (16 September 1970), Royal Malaysian Reconnaissance Corps (May 1979) to Royal Cavalry Corps (December 1979) and finally to Kor Armor DiRaja (Royal Armoured Corps) on 8 December 1986.

== Royal Malaysian Navy ==
The Royal Malaysian Navy originated from the Straits Settlement Volunteer Reserve Force formed on 27 April 1934 in Singapore. The formation of a Penang branch in 1938 saw its expansion. When the Second World War broke out in 1939, Britain strengthened its Naval Force in Southeast Asia by forming a unit called the "Malay Section of The Royal Navy" to protect the security of Singapore and Malaya. This unit which consisted of 400 men underwent training at a training camp called HMMS Pelandok, a British naval base in Singapore. Expansion saw the unit increase to 1450 men during World War II. Due to shortage of funds, the British disbanded the force after World War II in April 1947. The Malayan Naval Forces was again created in 1948 in response to the Malayan Emergency with the loan of one landing ship and five fast surface launches from the Royal Navy. In 1953, Queen Elizabeth awarded the Malayan Navy a Royal status to become the Royal Malayan Navy. The first vessel was a minesweeper called HMS Penyu or Turtle. After independence, it was transferred from Singapore on 12 July 1958 as an independent sovereign navy. On 16 September 1963 it was renamed as the Tentera Laut Diraja Malaysia (Royal Malaysian Navy) in accordance to the formation of Malaysia.

== Royal Malaysian Air Force ==
The Royal Malaysian Air Force was founded in 1936 as the Straits Settlement Volunteer Air Force (SSVAF) and later in 1940 as the Malayan Volunteers Air Force (MVAF) until 1942 during the Fall of Malaya. It was then reactivated after World War II as the Malayan Auxiliary Air Force in 1950. The passing of the Air Force Ordinance by the Parliament on 2 June 1958 saw the creation of Royal Malayan Air Force (RMAF). The first adviser was seconded from the Royal Air Force (RAF), Air Commodore A.V.R Johnstsone who became the first Chief of the RMAF. The proud few who formed the RMAF were Flying Officer Lim Heng Lip, Sergeant Subramanian, Corporal Othman Mohd Ismail, Corporal Wan Said, Corporal JD Parsley, Corporal Mahadeven, Senior Aircraftman (SAC) Surindam, SAC Md Noor, SAC Zainal, SAC Mohd Hussain and Junior Technician (JT) Ismail Ariffin. The first aircraft acquired for Squadron No 1 was a Scottish Aviation Twin Pioneer which served the RMAF for 12 years. It was named Lang Rajawali by Tunku Abdul Rahman, the first Prime Minister of Malaya. With the formation of Malaysia on 16 September 1963, the name of the force was changed to Tentera Udara Diraja Malaysia (Royal Malaysian Air Force).

== Engagements ==
At the time of independence in 1957, the Malayan Armed Forces, together with British Commonwealth troops were engaged in the Emergency, a communist insurgency in the Malayan interior. The Malayan Communist Party, led by Chin Peng, found support mainly among the ethnic Chinese. Independence for Malaya removed the major grounds for the rebellion, and by 1960 Chin Peng had ordered an end to the fighting.

Three years after the end of the Emergency, the merger of Malaya, Singapore, Sarawak and North Borneo (now Sabah) to form the current Federation of Malaysia was opposed militarily by the Sukarno regime of Indonesia. Called the Confrontation, this was mainly a low-level conflict fought in the jungles of Borneo. Malaysian forces were once again assisted by Commonwealth troops. By 1966, Sukarno had been toppled, and the war was at an end.

However, just three years later, Chin Peng reignited the dormant communist insurgency. The communists never gained much ground, and were engaged mainly by the Royal Malaysian Police. Nevertheless, it was twenty years before a peace agreement was signed in 1989.
