= List of extreme points of Malaysia =

Extreme points of Malaysia marked on the map of Malaysia

The extreme points of Malaysia include the coordinates that are further north, south, east or west than any other location in Malaysia; and the highest and the lowest altitudes in the country.

The coordinates used in this article are sourced from Google Earth, which makes use of the WGS84 geodetic reference system. Additionally, a negative altitude value refers to land below sea level.

== Extreme points ==
=== Overall ===
Heading	Location	State	Bordering entity	Coordinates^{†}	Ref
North	Pulau Guhuan Utara near Banggi Island	Sabah	Strait of Balabac	7°22′46″N 117°14′05″E	
South	Bukit Niat, Serian	Sarawak	West Kalimantan, Indonesia	0°51′10″N 110°34′17″E	
East	Tanjung Atiam, Lahad Datu	Sabah	Sulu Sea	5°14′27″N 119°16′00″E	
West	Pulau Perak off the western coast of Kedah	Kedah	Strait of Malacca	6°5′26″N 98°55′48″E	

=== Peninsular Malaysia ===
The following are the extreme physical land mass points on the Malaysian peninsula inclusive of islands.

Heading	Location	State	Bordering entity	Coordinates^{†}	Ref
North	Bukit China near Wang Kelian	Perlis	Satun Province, Thailand	6°43′33″N 100°12′14″E	
South	Tanjung Piai	Johor	Strait of Malacca	1°15′58″N 103°30′39″E	
East	Pulau Aur	Johor	South China Sea	2°26′57″N 104°31′30″E	
West	Pulau Perak	Kedah	Strait of Malacca	6°5′26″N 98°55′48″E	

=== Landmark points of Peninsular Malaysia accessible by road ===
The following are the extreme physical landmark points on the Malaysian peninsula exclusive of islands.

Heading	Location	State	Bordering entity	Coordinates^{†}	Ref
North	Kangar 0 KM mile marker	Perlis	Satun Province, Thailand	6°26′25″N 100°11′42″E	
South	Tanjung Piai	Johor	Strait of Malacca	1°16′18″N 103°30′37″E	
East	Tanjung Penyusop	Johor	South China Sea	1°21′58″N 104°15′11″E	
West	Kuala Perlis	Perlis	Strait of Malacca	6°23′41″N 100°07′43″E	

=== East Malaysia ===
The following are the extreme physical land mass points in East Malaysia inclusive of islands.

Heading	Location	State	Bordering entity	Coordinates^{†}	Ref
North	Pulau Guhuan Utara near Banggi Island	Sabah	Sulu Sea	7°22′46″N 117°14′05″E	
North (in mainland Borneo)	Tanjung Simpang Mengayau	Sabah	Sulu Sea	7°2′4″N 116°44′54″E	
South	Bukit Niat near Serian	Sarawak	West Kalimantan, Indonesia	0°51′10″N 110°34′17″E	
East	Near Kampong Look Sembuang in Lahad Datu	Sabah	Sulu Sea	5°14′27″N 119°16′00″E	
West	Near Gunung Cermai in Kuching	Sarawak	West Kalimantan, Indonesia	1°54′15″N 109°32′48″E	

== Extreme altitudes ==
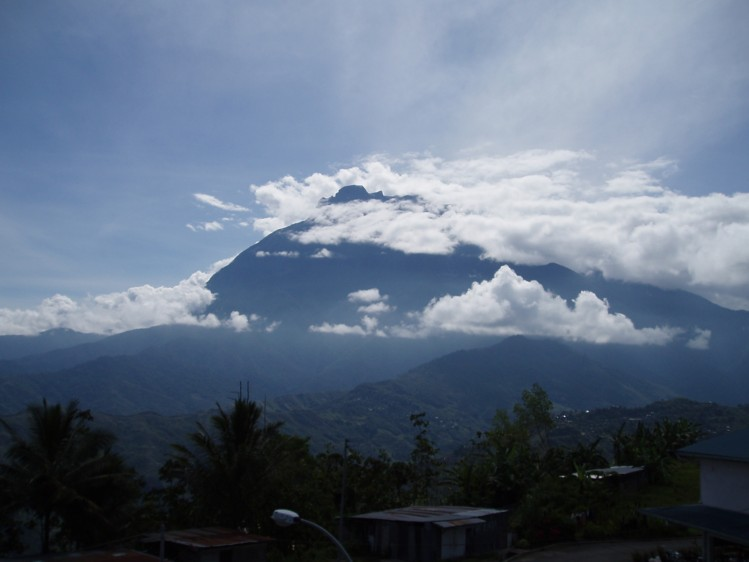
The summit of Mount Kinabalu is the highest point in Malaysia.

Extremity	Name	Altitude	State	Coordinates^{†}	Ref
Highest (Borneo)	Mount Kinabalu	4,095 m (13,435 ft)	Sabah	06°04′23″N 116°33′40″E	
Highest (Peninsular)	Mount Tahan	2,187 m (7,175 ft)	Pahang	4°37′56″N 102°14′03″E	
Lowest	South China Sea	0 m (0 ft)		2°7′23″N 106°33′16″E	

== Notes ==
^†Coordinates obtained from Google Earth. Google Earth makes use of the WGS84 geodetic reference system.

== See also ==
- Geography of Malaysia
- Extreme points of Asia
