= List of ecoregions in Malaysia =

Malaysia is a megadiverse country, with huge variety of biota.

== Terrestrial ecoregions ==
Malaysia is in the Indomalayan realm.

=== Tropical and subtropical moist broadleaf forests ===
- Borneo lowland rain forests
- Borneo montane rain forests
- Borneo peat swamp forests
- Peninsular Malaysian montane rain forests
- Peninsular Malaysian peat swamp forests
- Peninsular Malaysian rain forests
- Southwest Borneo freshwater swamp forests
- Tenasserim-South Thailand semi-evergreen rain forests

=== Montane grasslands and shrublands ===
- Kinabalu montane alpine meadows

=== Mangroves ===
- Indochina mangroves
- Myanmar coast mangroves
- Sunda Shelf mangroves

== Freshwater ecoregions ==
- Borneo Highlands
- Malay Peninsula Eastern Slope
- Northern Central Sumatra - Western Malaysia
- Northeastern Borneo
- Northwestern Borneo

== Marine ecoregions ==
Malaysia spans the transition between the Central Indo-Pacific and Western Indo-Pacific marine realms.

=== Central Indo-Pacific ===
- Gulf of Thailand
- Malacca Strait
- Palawan/North Borneo
- Sunda Shelf/Java Sea

=== Western Indo-Pacific ===
- Andaman Sea Coral Coast
