= World Congress of Accountants =

International meeting

The World Congress of Accountants (WCOA) has been held under the auspices of the International Federation of Accountants (IFAC), the worldwide organization for the accountancy profession, every five years since 1952 and every four years since 2002. The host organization rotates every four years to a different national professional accounting organization, chosen by an IFAC selection team. The objective of the team is to select the candidate most likely to host a financially and otherwise successful World Congress and surrounding program. Selection criteria include the abilities and experience of the member body and the professional conference organizers in organizing such events; the suitability of the proposed venue; and the attractiveness to potential delegates of the venue and of the country in which it is situated; among other criteria.

The Congress gives participants the opportunity to listen to world-class speakers and leaders of the finance and business community, to exchange views with other accounting and finance professionals from around the world, and to debate current issues and trends in the profession. Congress speakers include international and national standards setters, accounting organizations, accounting firms, regulators, and commerce groups.

About eighteen months in advance of the Congress, IFAC issues a call for applications for research papers; selected papers are published and distributed at the Congress to stimulate debate and share innovative thought leadership. The submission guidelines in the call for papers document state that "papers are welcomed on original and unpublished research by scholars belonging to academic or accountancy bodies".

Since the first World Congress of Accountants was held in 1904, presentation topics have included accounting for profits and government issues, public sector accounting, and fair value accounting.

Dubbed by some as the "Olympics of the Accountancy Profession", the WCOA attracts thousands of accountants, with 6,000 delegates from 134 countries attending the 18th World Congress of Accountants in Kuala Lumpur in 2010.

== World Congress of Accountants held to date ==
To date there have been 21 WCOAs:

1st World Congress of Accountants (St. Louis, USA, 1904)

2nd World Congress of Accountants (Amsterdam, the Netherlands, 1926)

3rd World Congress of Accountants (New York City, United States of America, 1929)

4th World Congress of Accountants (London, United Kingdom, 1933)

5th World Congress of Accountants (Berlin, Germany, 1938)

6th World Congress of Accountants (London, United Kingdom, 1952)

7th World Congress of Accountants (Amsterdam, the Netherlands, 1957)

8th World Congress of Accountants (New York, United States of America, 1962)

9th World Congress of Accountants (Paris, France, 1967)

10th World Congress of Accountants (Sydney, Australia, 1972)

11th World Congress of Accountants (Munich, Germany, 1977)

12th World Congress of Accountants (Mexico City, Mexico, 1982)

13th World Congress of Accountants (Tokyo, Japan 1987)

14th World Congress of Accountants (Washington, USA, 1992)

15th World Congress of Accountants (Paris, France, 1997)

16th World Congress of Accountants (Hong Kong, People's Republic of China, 2002)

17th World Congress of Accountants was held in Istanbul in November 2006. Its major theme is 'Accountants: generating economic growth and stability worldwide’.

== 18th World Congress of Accountants, 2010, Kuala Lumpur ==
The 18th World Congress of Accountants was held in Kuala Lumpur, Malaysia in November 2010. The theme for this world congress was Accountants: Sustaining Value Creation. This world congress was hosted by the Malaysian Institute of Accountants.

== 19th World Congress of Accountants, 2014, Rome ==
The 19th World Congress of Accountants was held in Rome, Italy, on November 10–13, 2014. The theme was 2020 Vision: Learning from the Past, Building the Future. For this Congress, IFAC selected the Consiglio Nazionale dei Dottori Commercialisti e degli Esperti Contabili, an Italy- based organization and IFAC member body as the hosting organization. The major sponsor- termed the Imperial sponsor- for this event is Chartered Global Management Accountant (CGMA).

== 20th World Congress of Accountants, 2018, Sydney ==
The 20th World Congress of Accountants was held in Sydney, Australia, in November 2018. The conference was co-hosted by Chartered Accountants Australia New Zealand and CPA Australia.

== 21st World Congress of Accountants, 2022, Mumbai ==
The 21st World Congress of Accountants will be held in Mumbai, India, in November 2022. The host organization is the Institute of Chartered Accountants of India. 21st World Congress of Accountants 2022 scheduled to be held from November 18-21, 2022 at Jio World Centre, Mumbai, India, in Hybrid mode. Building Trust Enabling Sustainability is the topic for WCOA 2022.
