= Accounting in Malaysia =

Accountancy profession in Malaysia

The accountancy profession in Malaysia is regulated by the Malaysian Institute of Accountants (MIA) through the powers conferred by the Accountants Act, 1967. The MIA is an agency under the Ministry of Finance and reports directly to the Accountant General Office. As at 4 February 2016, MIA has 32,618 members of which 68% are involved in commerce and industry, 22% in public practice and 10% in government and academia. Selangor and the Wilayah Persekutuan Kuala Lumpur Federal Territory have the largest concentration of MIA membership with 13,125 and 7,351 members respectively. https://web.archive.org/web/20150725035639/http://www.mia.org.my/new/members_statistics_state.asp

MIA sets the By-Laws (On Professional conduct & Ethics) and auditing standards for the accountancy profession in Malaysia, which are in line with the standards issued by the International Federation of Accountants (IFAC) and the International Auditing and Assurance Standards Board (IAASB).

== Other Accountancy Bodies in Malaysia ==
The Malaysian Institute of Certified Public Accountants (MICPA), which was established in 1958, is another accountancy body that is involved in the training and development of accountants in Malaysia. Apart from that, accountancy bodies from the Commonwealth countries such as the Association of Chartered Certified Accountants (ACCA), Chartered Institute of Management Accountants (CIMA), the Institute of Chartered Accountants in England and Wales (ICAEW), the Institute of Chartered Accountants in Australia (ICAA) and CPA Australia are also active in training and developing Malaysians towards attaining professional accountancy qualifications.

After the Malaysian Institute of Accountant (MIA) and Malaysian Institute of Certified Public Accountants (MICPA), the third largest accounting body in Malaysia is Institute of Commercial and Industrial Accountants, Malaysia (ICIA).

The institute (ICIA) has signed an MRA with IPA Australia with reciprocal recognition: of membership status. This means that associates of the ICIA with recognized tertiary qualifications in accounting are eligible to be admitted as an Associate member of the IPA (AIPA). In addition Certified members of the ICIA (deemed to be the equivalent of an Australian bachelor's degree), having completed all the required ICIA professional exams and the required 3 years’ Practical Training with an approved training organization are eligible to be admitted as a full member (MIPA) of the IPA.

ICIA had recently changed its name to Association of Certified Accountants, Malaysia. With this new name, the Association aim to bring in more accounting staff or workers to join so that their accounting knowledge can be improve over time.

== Accountancy Education ==
Accounting courses are offered both by the public and private higher education institutions in Malaysia. Presently, accountancy degree from 11 institutions of higher learning are recognised for the purpose of admission to the membership of MIA. Some of the institution of higher learnings also offer programmes leading towards attaining professional accountancy qualifications such as ACCA, CIMA, ICAEW, CPA Australia and MICPA.

== Accounting Standards ==
Accounting standards are issued by the Malaysian Accounting Standards Board (MASB) by virtue of the power conferred by the Financial Reporting Act, 1997. The Financial Reporting Act also establishes the Financial Reporting Foundation, which is the body that is responsible to oversee MASB's performance and financial arrangement.

The MASB had announced the effort to bring Malaysia to be in full convergence with the International Financial Reporting Standards (IFRS) by 2012.

In February 2014, the MASB issued Malaysian Private Entities Reporting Standard (MPERS) and this sets a new milestone for financial reporting of private entities in Malaysia. MPERS is based substantially on the International Financial Reporting Standard for Small and Medium-sized Entities (IFRS for SMEs) issued by the IASB in July 2009. The new reporting framework, known as the MPERS Framework, is effective for financial statements beginning on or after 1 January 2016, with early application permitted.

Private entities now have a choice of continuing with the existing Private Entity Reporting Standards (PERS) Framework, or apply the Malaysian Financial Reporting Standards (MFRS) Framework (mandatory for non-private entities, except transitioning entities), or by 1 January 2016, mandatory migration to the new MPERS Framework. As the requirement for first-time adoption of MPERS is retrospective, it is important the private entities prepare in advance if they have to migrate to the MPERS Framework or the MFRS Framework in the near future.

== Accounting Firms in Malaysia ==
Till 2015, there were almost 1400 operating accounting firms in Malaysia. https://web.archive.org/web/20150718040257/http://www.mia.org.my/new/circularandresources_miaannualreport.asp . Most of the global networks of accounting firms such as Ernst & Young, Deloitte, KPMG, PricewaterhouseCoopers, BDO, Mazars, Geneva Group International, Crowe Horwath, Baker Tilly, Urbach Hacker Young and Grant Thornton have their presence in Malaysia.

Accounting firms have to be registered with MIA and members of MIA who wish to offer public practice services should also possess practising certificate issue by MIA. However, specific approvals should be obtained to provide the following services:

- Audit of limited companies; approval to be obtained from the Ministry of Finance and firms should be registered with the Companies Commission Malaysia
- Audit of co-operative societies; approval to be obtained from the Malaysia Co-operative Society Commission
- Audit of banks and financial institutions; approval to be obtained from Bank Negara Malaysia
- Tax agent services, approval to be obtained from the Inland Revenue Board
- Receivership and liquidation services; approval to be obtained from the Ministry of Finance
- Financial planning; approval to be obtained from the Securities Commission Malaysia

== See also ==
- International Federation of Accountants
- Confederation of Asian and Pacific Accountants
- International Auditing and Assurance Standards Board
