= Malaysian Institute of Accountants =

- Abbreviation: MIA
- Formation: 1 January 1967; 59 years ago
- Legal status: Body corporate incorporated under the Accountants Act, 1967 of the Parliament of Malaysia
- Headquarters: Kuala Lumpur, Malaysia
- Region served: Malaysia
- Members: 40,663 members (as of 31 May 2025)
- Official language: English and Malay
- President: Dato' Saniza Said
- Vice-President: Ahmad Syahazan Yaacob
- Chief Executive Officer: G Shanmugam
- Website: www.mia.org.my

Malaysian Institute of Accountants (MIA) is the umbrella body for the accountancy profession in Malaysia. It was established under the Accountants Act, 1967 to regulate and develop the accountancy profession in this country. MIA operates under the purview of the Ministry of Finance through the Accountant General's Department.

MIA is the only accountancy body empowered by law to regulate the accountancy profession in Malaysia, thus making MIA membership mandatory for those holding themselves out or practising as an accountant in the country. MIA's membership encompasses both legal and market recognition for accountants in Malaysia.

Members of MIA are conferred with the designation Chartered Accountant Malaysia, abbreviated as ‘C.A.(M)’. This designation is given to a professional in accountancy, business and finance with recognised accountancy qualification and relevant work experience. At present, there are more than 40,650 MIA members working in all industries and states of Malaysia.

As an umbrella body for all the accountants in Malaysia, MIA's responsibilities include education and quality assurance as well as enforcement, to maintain the credibility of the profession and the public interest. MIA is a member of the International Federation of Accountants (IFAC) and the ASEAN Federation of Accountants (AFA).

MIA hosted the 18th World Congress of Accountants from 8–11 November 2010, which was held at the Kuala Lumpur Convention Centre. A record number of 6,000 delegates from 134 countries participated. The Congress, which originated in 1904 and has been held regularly since 1977, was jointly organised by the MIA and the International Federation of Accountants (IFAC).

== Presidents of MIA ==
The President is elected among the members of MIA Council. Among those who served as president are:

- Dato' Shamsir Omar (1967–87)
- Dato' Hanifah Noordin (1987–99)
- Dato' Syed Amin Aljeffri (2000)
- Tan Sri Abdul Samad Hj. Alias (2000–05)
- Abdul Rahim Abdul Hamid (2005–07)
- Nik Mohd Hasyudeen Yusoff (2007–09)
- Abdul Rahim Abdul Hamid (2009–11)
- Datuk Mohd Nasir Ahmad (2011–13)
- Datuk Johan Idris (2013–15)
- Dato' Mohammad Faiz Azmi (2015–17)
- Salihin Abang (2017–2019)
- Huang Shze Jiun (2019–2020)
- Dr Veerinderjeet Singh (2020–2022)
- Datuk Bazlan Osman (2022–2024)
- Dato’ Seri Dr Mohamad Zabidi Ahmad (2024)

== See also ==
- Accounting in Malaysia
