= Johor Bahru City Square (shopping mall) =

Shopping mall in Johor Bahru, Johor, Malaysia

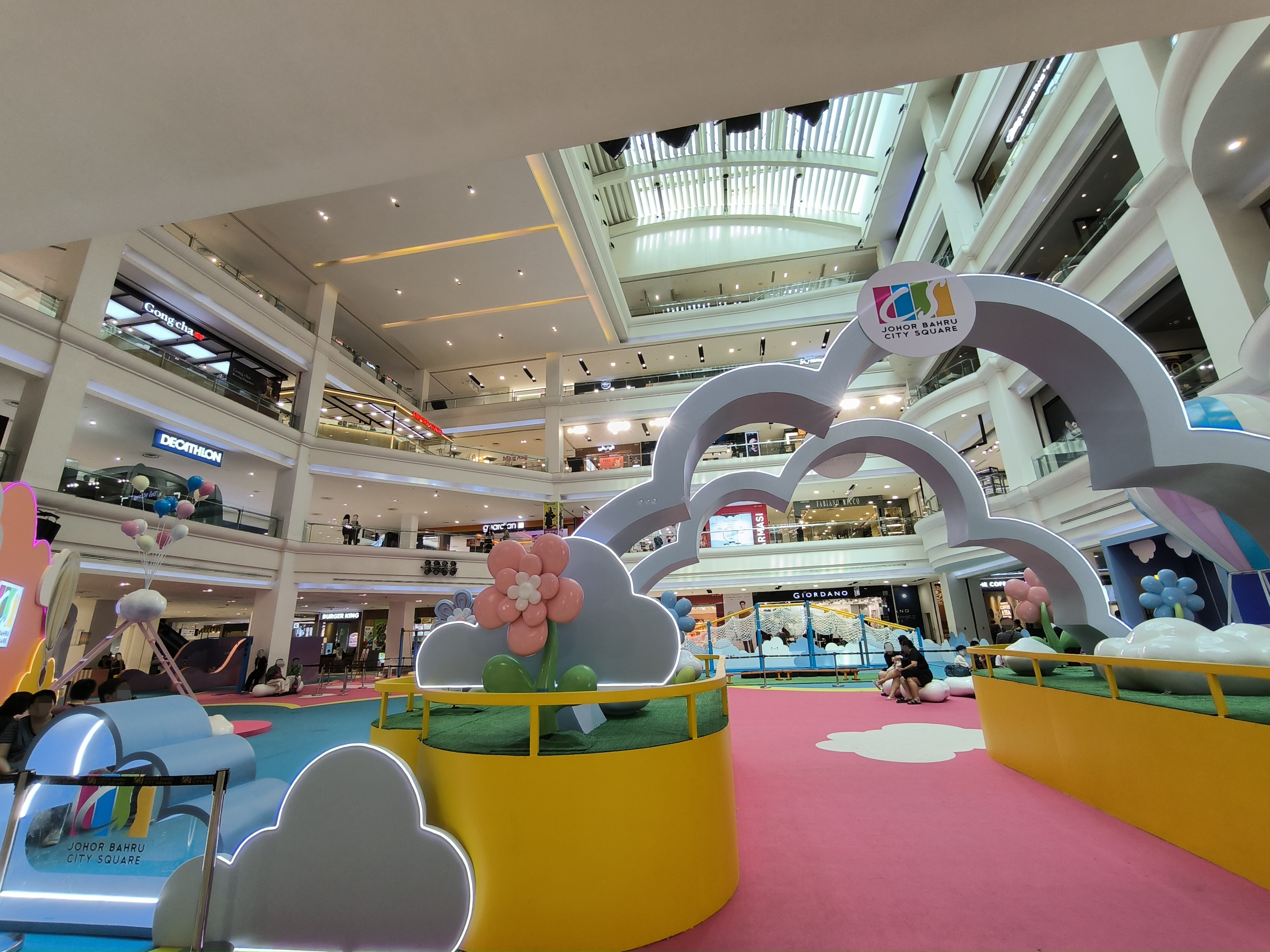
- Mall atrium in 2024
- Location: Johor Bahru, Johor, Malaysia
- Coordinates: 1°27′40.3″N 103°45′51.1″E
- Address: 106–108, Jalan Wong Ah Fook, 80888, Ibrahim International Business District (IIBD), Johor Darul Ta'zim.
- Opened: 1999
- Owner: Allgreen Properties Limited (1999–2004; 2024–present); Government of Singapore Investment Corporation (GIC) (2004–2024)
- Num. of stores: 300+
- Num. of anchor tenants: Popular, Uniqlo, H&M, Sakae Sushi and others
- Floor area: 41,800 m^{2} (450,000 sq ft)
- Floors: 7 (mall area), 3 basements
- Parking: Yes
- Website: www.citysqjb.com

Johor Bahru City Square is a shopping centre and office building situated close to the Johor–Singapore Causeway which borders the two countries along Wong Ah Fook Street in Johor Bahru, Johor, Malaysia.

== History ==
The building was opened in 1999 and is generally geared to Singaporeans from across the Straits of Johor. In 2000, the Mega Pavilion Cinema has been upgraded to Cathay Cineplex with new theatres at both level 5 and level 7. In 2005, the Singapore Visitor Centre was launched at the shopping mall. In December 2008, a pedestrian bridge connecting the building to the Southern Integrated Gateway (Johor Bahru Sentral railway station and the Sultan Iskandar Building) was opened.

In November 2025, a phased revamp was announced to capture increased footfall from the RTS Link and attract more Singaporean shoppers, expanding the floor space to 568,927 square feet (52,855.0 m^{2}). Scheduled for completion by Q4 2027, the upgraded mall will feature over 300 shops across themed floors, a 41,300 square feet (3,840 m^{2}) Health and Wellness Hub, and a 15,000 square feet (1,400 m^{2}) Kids Adventure Park. Hotel apartments are also slated to be added above the mall by Q2 2028.

== Architecture ==
The building interior consists of a seven-storey mall with six levels of retail outlet space, including a thirty-six storey office block, which is divided into the lower, middle and upper zones. City Square has three floors of the basement car park. Level 6 has an outdoor garden, a pond and a green wall. The shopping mall total floors spread over an area of 41,800 m^{2} (450,000 sq ft) and consists of over 200 retailers.

== Business ==
The shopping mall includes several anchor tenants and has various dining, lifestyle and fashion outlets with several clothing, shoes, bags, electronic stores.

Due in part to its proximity to the Johor–Singapore Causeway, City Square attracts many shoppers from Singapore and receives around 1.5 million visitors monthly.

== Ownership history ==
The mall was originally developed by Allgreen Properties, a subsidiary of the Kuok Group, and opened in 1999. In 2004, the Government of Singapore Investment Corporation (GIC), a Singaporean sovereign wealth fund, acquired a 70% majority stake in the mall, with the remaining shares divided between the Johor Bahru City Council and Iskandar Puteri City Council. Allgreen Properties bought back GIC's 70% stake in May 2024, giving the Kuok Group an effective 76% controlling interest in the property.

== See also ==
- List of shopping malls in Malaysia
