= Komtar JBCC =

Shopping mall in Johor Bahru, Malaysia

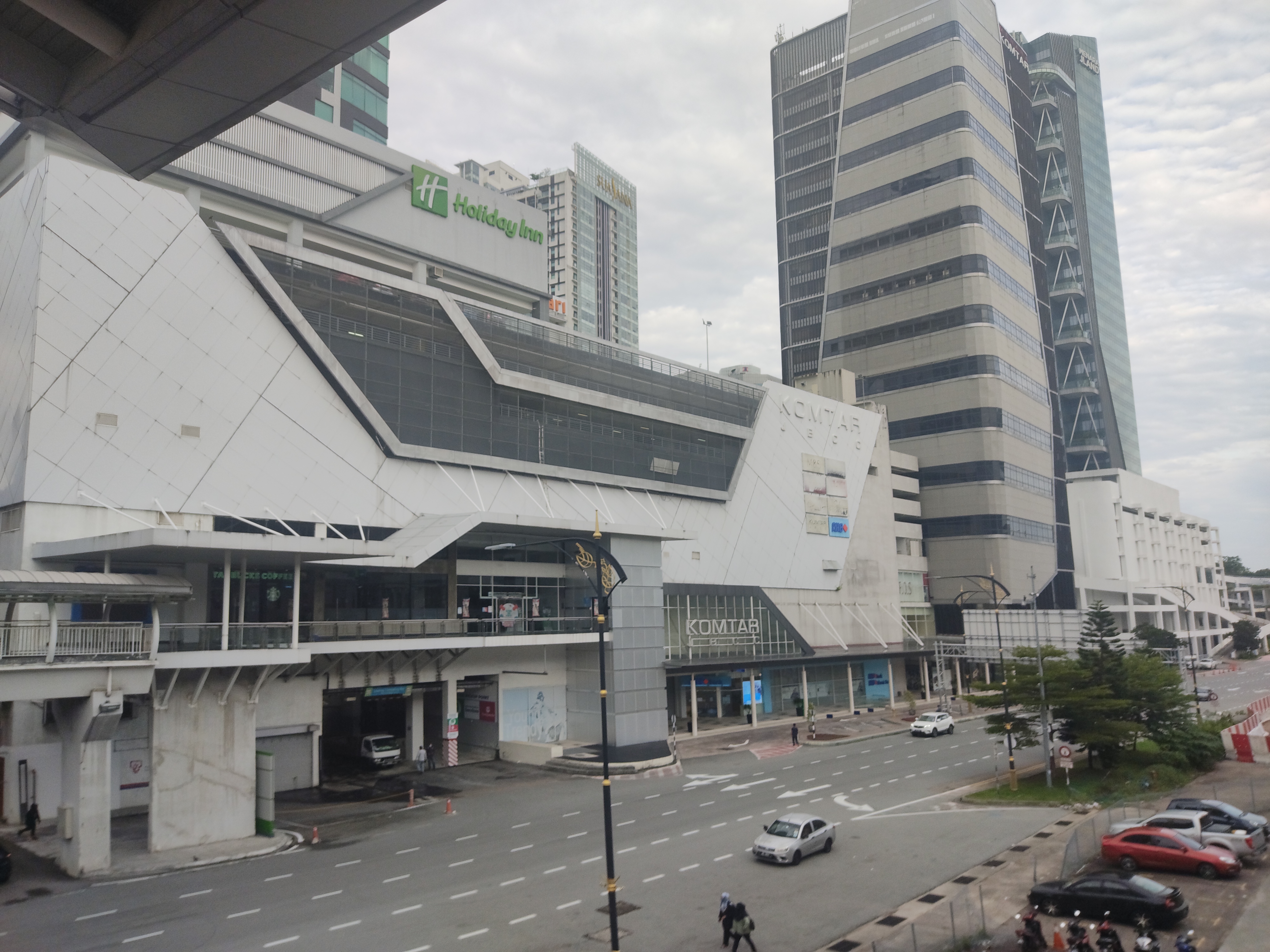
- Location: Johor Bahru, Johor, Malaysia
- Coordinates: 1°27′49.2″N 103°45′46.2″E
- Opened: 2 August 2014; 12 years ago
- Developer: Damansara Assets Sdn Bhd
- Manager: Synergy Mall Management Sdn. Bhd
- Owner: Al-Salam REIT
- Num. of stores: 150
- Floor area: 57,913 m^{2}
- Floors: 4
- Parking: 1,700
- Public transit: Johor Bahru Sentral Station
- Website: www.komtarjbcc.com.my

Komtar JBCC is a shopping mall in Johor Bahru, Johor, Malaysia.

== History ==
The shopping mall was established as a redevelopment project of the old KOMTAR building complex. The old building was transformed into a modern shopping mall, hotel and office with a cost of MYR400 million. The soft opening of the shopping mall was held on 2 August 2014 and was fully completed in November the same year.

== Architecture ==
The shopping mall features a souk bazaar, eateries, lifestyle-centric outlets, an indoor children playground and a minimart with 1,700 parking bays in the four-level car park housed in a four-story building. It has a total floor area of 57,913 square metres (623,370 sq ft).

== Transportation ==
The shopping mall is accessible within walking distance from Johor Bahru Sentral station.
