= Malaysia Federal Route 35 =

Road in Malaysia

Federal Route 35
- Permas Jaya-Pasir Gudang Road(Johor Bahru East Coast Parkway)

Route information
- Maintained by Malaysian Public Works Department
- Length: 13.4 km (8.3 mi)
- Existed: 2008–present
- History: Partially completed till Taman Megah Ria (2012); Section from Taman Megah Ria to Pasir Gudang Highway opened 2013

Major junctions
- West end: Johor Bahru; Kampung Bakar Batu
- J5 Johor Bahru East Coast Parkway; Johor Bahru Eastern Dispersal Link Expressway / AH2; Jalan Permas Utara; Jalan Permas Selatan; FT 17 Pasir Gudang Highway
- East end: Pasir Gudang

Location
- Country: Malaysia
- Primary destinations: Permas Jaya, Taman Rinting

Highway system
- Highways in Malaysia; Expressways; Federal; State

The Permas Jaya-Pasir Gudang Highway or Johor Bahru East Coast Parkway, Federal Route 35, is a major highway in Johor Bahru, Johor, Malaysia. It is a toll free highway and part of the Iskandar Malaysia project. This 13.4 km (8.3 mile) highway connects Bakar Batu in city centre to the town of Pasir Gudang, and passes through Bandar Baru Permas Jaya and Taman Rinting. This highway also passes through Permas Jaya Bridge and is the alternative way to Pasir Gudang besides Pasir Gudang Highway. Johor Bahru East Coast Parkway is the fourth east–west-oriented expressway in the Iskandar Malaysia area after the Pasir Gudang Highway, the Pontian–Johor Bahru Link of the Second Link Expressway and the Senai–Desaru Expressway.

== Route background ==
The Kilometre Zero of the Federal Route 35 starts at Kampung Bakar Batu Interchange.

In 2014, the Johor Bahru East Coast Parkway was gazetted as "Federal Route 35".

At most sections, the Federal Route 35 was built under the JKR R5 road standard, allowing maximum speed limit of up to 90 km/h.

There are no alternate routes, or sections with motorcycle lanes.

== Junction lists ==
The entire route is located in Johor Bahru District, Johor.

Legend:

- I/C - Interchange, I/S - Intersection, RSA - Rest and service area, OBR - Overhead bridge restaurant, R/R - Restaurant and rest plaza, L/B - Layby, V/P - Vista point, TN - tunnel, T/P - Toll plaza, BR - Bridge
- C - Cloverleaf, S - Stack, T-A - Trumpet-A, T-B - Trumpet-B, DT - Directional-T/Y, SDT - Semi-Directional-T/Y, P-Y - Partial-Y, D - Diamond, P-C - Partial cloverleaf, D-D - Diverging diamond, D-R - Direct ramp

Location	km	mi	Exit	Name	Destinations	Notes
Johor Bahru	0.0	0.0	1	Johor Bahru; Kampung Bakar Batu I/C	J5 Johor Bahru East Coast Parkway; Jalan Bakar Batu/ FT 3 / AH18 Tebrau Highway – Taman Sentosa, Bandar Seri Alam, Pasir Gudang, Kota Tinggi; Jalan Pasir Pelangi – Kampung Bakar Batu, Taman Sentosa, Pasir Pelangi, City Centre; Johor Bahru Eastern Dispersal Link Expressway / AH2 – Pandan, Kuala Lumpur, Malacca, Senai International Airport, Setia Tropika, Bandar Dato' Onn, Mersing, Kota Tinggi, City centre, Woodlands (Singapore), Sultan Iskandar Building (CIQ Complex)	Elevated stacked interchange
Johor Bahru			–	Bayu Puteri; Taman Seri Setanggi	Jalan Bayu Puteri 1 – Bayu Puteri; Jalan Sri Stulang – Projek Perumahaan Rakyat, Taman Seri Setanggi, Taman Sri Stulang	LILO entry/exit
Johor Bahru			Shell L/B – Shell petrol stations with 7-Eleven			
Johor Bahru			–	Proton showroom	Proton showroom	
Permas Jaya			Permas Jaya Bridge; Sungai Tebrau; U-Turn – Johor Bahru			
Permas Jaya			Permas Jaya Bridge; Sungai Tebrau; Sungai Plentong; Main navigational span			
Permas Jaya			Permas Jaya Bridge; Sungai Plentong; U-Turn – Pasir Gudang			
Permas Jaya			Petronas L/B (Johor Bahru bound) – Petronas Starbucks			
Permas Jaya			Shell L/B (Johor Bahru bound) – Shell			
Permas Jaya			–	Jalan Permas 11/5	Jalan Permas 11/5	LILO exit Pasir Gudang bound
Permas Jaya			2	Permas Jaya; Permas Jaya I/C	Jalan Permas Utara – Plentong, Masai, Taman Johor Jaya, Pasir Gudang, Giant Hypermarket Plentong, Tesco Extra Hypermarket Plentong, AEON Permas Jaya; Jalan Permas Selatan – Permas Jaya Golf and Country Club, Kampung Senibong	Diamond interchange
Permas Jaya			–	Jalan Permas Barat	Jalan Permas Barat	LILO exit Pasir Gudang bound
Permas Jaya			3	Teluk Senibong I/C	Jalan Teluk Senibong – Senibong Cove	Half-diamond interchange
Permas Jaya			Sungai Lunchu bridge			
Permas Jaya			4	Kota Puteri I/C	Jalan Kota – Kota Puteri, Bandar Sri Alam	T-junctions; Future diamond interchange
Permas Jaya			–	Tropicana Danga Cove	Tropicana Danga Cove	
Permas Jaya			Sungai Rekoh bridge U-Turn – Johor Bahru			
Permas Jaya			5	Taman Rinting Exit	Jalan Rinting – Taman Rinting, Bandar Seri Alam, Masai	LILO Exit; Pasir Gudang bound
Permas Jaya			–	U-Turn	West – Johor Bahru; East – Pasir Gudang	
Pasir Gudang			Sungai Masai bridge MBJB-MPPG border limit			
Pasir Gudang			6	Kampung Pasir Gudang I/C	Jalan Kampung Pasir Gudang – Kampung Pasir Gudang, Pasir Gudang, Taman Mawar, Taman Bukit Dahlia, Taman Scientex, Asia Pacific Trade & Expo City (APTEC), Pasir Gudang Recreational Park, Bukit Layang Layang, Muzium Layang Layang, Masjid Jamek Pasir Gudang, Johor Circuit	LILO exit Pasir Gudang bound Future diamond interchange
Pasir Gudang			7	Pasir Gudang; Pasir Gudang I/C	FT 17 Pasir Gudang Highway – Masai, Tampoi, Skudai, Senai, Kota Tinggi, Town Centre, Johor Port, Tanjung Langsat; FT 17 Jalan Pekeliling – Malaysian Marine and Heavy Engineering Shipyard, Sultan Iskandar Power Station	Cloverleaf interchange
1.000 mi = 1.609 km; 1.000 km = 0.621 mi: Proposed; Incomplete access
