= Johor Bahru–Pasir Gudang Elevated Expressway =

Road in Malaysia

Route information
- Maintained by Beta Infra Sdn Bhd
- Length: 50 km (31 mi)

Major junctions
- West end: Tampoi; Johor Bahru
- FT 1 Skudai Highway; FT 17 Pasir Gudang Highway; North–South Expressway Southern Route / AH2; FT 35 Johor Bahru East Coast Highway
- East end: Pasir Gudang

Location
- Country: Malaysia
- Primary destinations: Kempas, Tebrau, Plentong, Bandar Seri Alam

Highway system
- Highways in Malaysia; Expressways; Federal; State

The E53 Johor Bahru–Pasir Gudang Elevated Expressway (JOPGEX) is a new expressway under planning in Johor Bahru, Johor, Malaysia. The 50-kilometre (30 miles) expressway connects Tampoi, Tebrau, Plentong and Pasir Gudang. This project is part of the Iskandar Malaysia (formerly South Johor Economic Region (SJER) or Iskandar Development Region (IDR)) will be built to resolve traffic jams and accident prone problems along Pasir Gudang Highway (Federal Route 17).

== Interchange lists ==
The entire route is located in Johor Bahru District, Johor.

Legend:

- I/C - Interchange, I/S - Intersection, RSA - Rest and service area, OBR - Overhead bridge restaurant, R/R - Restaurant and rest plaza, L/B - Layby, V/P - Vista point, TN - tunnel, T/P - Toll plaza, BR - Bridge
- C - Cloverleaf, S - Stack, T-A - Trumpet-A, T-B - Trumpet-B, DT - Directional-T/Y, SDT - Semi-Directional-T/Y, P-Y - Partial-Y, D - Diamond, P-C - Partial cloverleaf, D-D - Diverging diamond, D-R - Direct ramp

Km	Exit	Elevated section	Interchange	Destinations	Note
11.2	5301		Tampoi North I/C	FT 1 Skudai Highway – Kulai, Senai, Senai International Airport, Skudai, City Centre, Woodlands (Singapore); North–South Expressway Southern Route / AH2 – Kuala Lumpur, Malacca	Double U-turn interchange
	T/P		Kempas Toll Plaza	Touch 'n Go SmartTAG MyRFID	
	BR	Kempas–Tebrau	Railway crossing bridge		
3.8	5301A		Pasir Gudang-NSE I/C	North–South Expressway Southern Route / AH2 – Kuala Lumpur, Malacca, Senai International Airport, Bandar Dato' Onn, Setia Tropika	Expressway interchange From/to Pasir Gudang
	T/P		Kangkar Tebrau Toll Plaza	Touch 'n Go SmartTAG MyRFID	
	BR		Sungai Tebrau bridge		
	BR	Tebrau–Pasir Gudang	Sungai Tebrau bridge		
	BR	Tebrau–Pasir Gudang	Sungai Plentong bridge		
	BR	Tebrau–Pasir Gudang	Sungai Tengkorak bridge		
	T/P	Tebrau–Pasir Gudang	Masai Toll Plaza	Touch 'n Go SmartTAG MyRFID	
	----		Pasir Gudang (West) I/C	FT 35 Johor Bahru East Coast Highway – Johor Bahru, Woodlands (Singapore), Bakar Batu, Permas Jaya, Taman Rinting; Jalan Pekeliling – Malaysian Marine and Heavy Engineering Shipyard, Sultan Iskandar Power Station	Cloverleaf interchange
