= Johor State Route J101 =

Road in Malaysia

Johor Route 101

Major junctions
- West end: Kampung Ubi
- FT 3 / AH18 Tebrau Highway
- East end: Pandan

Location
- Country: Malaysia
- Primary destinations: Tebrau Industrial Area II, Kangkar Tebrau, Taman Daya

Highway system
- Highways in Malaysia; Expressways; Federal; State

Johor State Route J101, Jalan Kangkar Tebrau is a major road in Johor Bahru, Johor, Malaysia. It is also a main route to Taman Daya.

== Junction lists ==
The entire route is located in Johor Bahru District, Johor.

Legend:

- I/C - Interchange, I/S - Intersection, RSA - Rest and service area, OBR - Overhead bridge restaurant, R/R - Restaurant and rest plaza, L/B - Layby, V/P - Vista point, TN - tunnel, T/P - Toll plaza, BR - Bridge
- C - Cloverleaf, S - Stack, T-A - Trumpet-A, T-B - Trumpet-B, DT - Directional-T/Y, SDT - Semi-Directional-T/Y, P-Y - Partial-Y, D - Diamond, P-C - Partial cloverleaf, D-D - Diverging diamond, D-R - Direct ramp

=== Kampung Ubi–Seri Purnama side ===
Location	km	mi	Name	Destinations	Notes
Tebrau			Kampung Ubi	FT 3 / AH18 Tebrau Highway – Bandar Seri Alam, Pasir Gudang, Kota Tinggi; North–South Expressway Southern Route / AH2 – Kuala Lumpur, Malacca, Senai, Senai International Airport; Johor Bahru Eastern Dispersal Link Expressway / AH2 – Woodlands (Singapore), Sultan Iskandar Building CIQ Complex, City Centre, Bakar Batu, Permas Jaya	Junctions
Tebrau			Jalan Temenggong	Jalan Temenggong 1 – Temenggong Industrial Area	T-junctions
Tebrau			Tebrau Fire and Rescue Station		
Tebrau			SMK Majidee Baru 2		
Tebrau			Dewani Industrial Area	Jalan Dewani – Dewani Industrial Area	T-junctions
Tebrau			Seri Purnama	Persiaran Seri Purnama – Tampoi, Skudai, Kampung Seri Purnama, Pandan Trading Centre; North–South Expressway Southern Route / AH2 – Kuala Lumpur, Malacca, Senai, Senai International Airport	T-junctions
1.000 mi = 1.609 km; 1.000 km = 0.621 mi: Incomplete access

=== Kangkar Tebrau–Pandan side ===
Location	km	mi	Name	Destinations	Notes
Kangkar Tebrau			Kangkar Tebrau	Jalan Firma 2 – Tebrau Industrial Area II, Tampoi, Skudai, Bandar Dato' Onn	Junctions
Kangkar Tebrau			Kangkar Tebrau Muslim Cemetery		
Kangkar Tebrau			Kangkar Tebrau		
Kangkar Tebrau			Kangkar Tebrau Mosque	Kangkar Tebrau Mosque	
Kangkar Tebrau			Tenaga Nasional Kangkar Tebrau Intake		
Kangkar Tebrau			Kangkar Tebrau		
Kangkar Tebrau			Sungai Tebrau bridge		
Kangkar Tebrau			Kangkar Tebrau		
Taman Daya			Alpha Industries Berhad factory		
Taman Daya			Taman Bunga Ros	Jalan Bunga Ros – Taman Bunga Ros	T-junctions
Taman Daya			Universal Cable (M) Berhad factory		
Taman Daya			Kangkar Tebrau Hindu Cemetery		
Taman Daya			Jalan Daya 1	Jalan Daya 1 – Taman Delima, Taman Daya, Taman Mount Austin, Adda Heights, Setia Indah	T-junctions
Taman Daya			Taman Delima		
Pandan			Pandan Malay Village		
Pandan			Kampung Pandan	Jalan Loo Hong Joon (Jalan Sendayan) – Kampung Pandan	T-junctions
Pandan			Taman Istimewa	Kampung Pandan Muslim Cemetery; Jalan Selasih – Taman Istimewa	Junctions
Pandan			Kampung Pandan		
Pandan			Kampung Pandan Chinese Cemetery		
Pandan			Kampung Pandan		
Pandan			Pandan	FT 3 / AH18 Tebrau Highway – Bandar Seri Alam, Pasir Gudang, Kota Tinggi	Junctions
1.000 mi = 1.609 km; 1.000 km = 0.621 mi: Incomplete access
