= Pasir Gudang Highway =

Road in Malaysia

Federal Route 17
- Pasir Gudang Highway
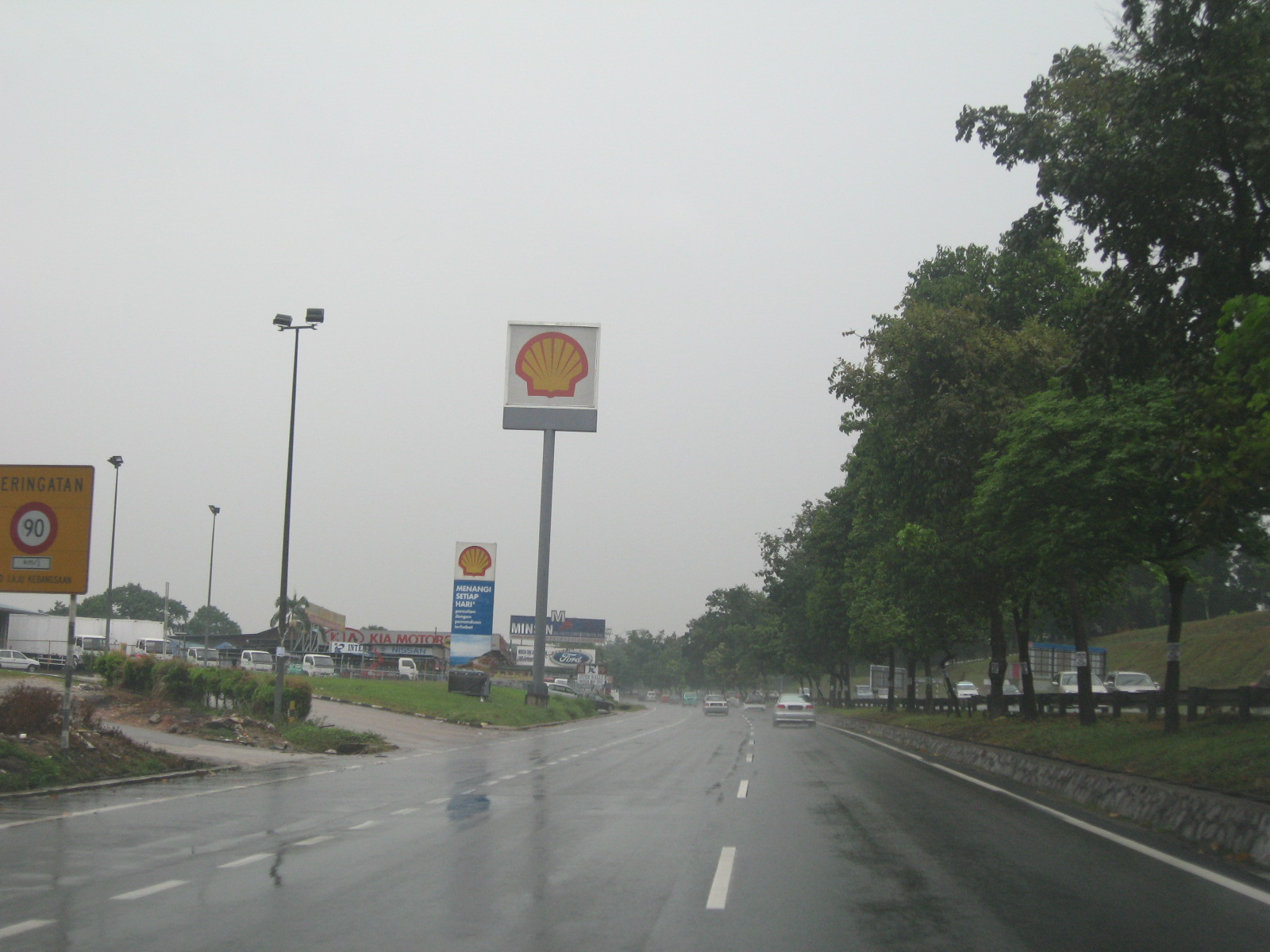

Route information
- Maintained by Malaysian Public Works Department
- Length: 30.4 km (18.9 mi)
- Existed: 1977–present
- History: Completed in 1979

Major junctions
- West end: Taman Perling
- Second Link Expressway / AH143; FT 1 Skudai Highway; J3 Kempas Highway; North–South Expressway Southern Route / AH2 FT 3 / AH18 Johor Bahru–Kota Tinggi Highway; J10 State Route J10; FT 35 Federal Route 35; Senai–Desaru Expressway
- East end: Tanjung Langsat

Location
- Country: Malaysia
- Primary destinations: Tampoi, Kempas, Tebrau, Johor Jaya, Plentong, Bandar Sri Alam, Masai, Pasir Gudang, Johor Port, Kampung Pasir Puteh

Highway system
- Highways in Malaysia; Expressways; Federal; State

Pasir Gudang Highway, also known as Federal Route 17, is a highway in Johor Bahru District, Johor, Malaysia that connects Tampoi North in the west to Pasir Gudang and Tanjung Langsat in the east. Pasir Gudang Highway is a four-laned highway, unlike the wider Skudai Highway which has six lanes. Many cargo trucks travel along the highway daily. Pasir Gudang Highway became the backbone of the road system linking Johor Bahru to Pasir Gudang before being surpassed by the E22 Senai–Desaru Expressway, and the FT35 Johor Bahru East Coast Parkway.

== Route background ==
The Kilometre Zero of the Pasir Gudang Highway is located at Tampoi, Johor, at its interchange with the Skudai Highway (Federal Route 1), the main trunk road of the central of Peninsular Malaysia.

== History ==
With the opening of the Johor Port on 1977. The new highway from Johor Bahru to Pasir Gudang was constructed. Construction of the highway began in 1977 and was completed in 1979.

On 10 March 2012, the Malaysian Prime Minister, Najib Tun Razak announced that the 15 km stretch from Tebrau to Seri Alam of the 32 km-long Pasir Gudang Highway would be upgraded from four-lane to six-lane carriageway.

== Features ==
- Four lane carriageway
- Narrow and no emergency lanes
- Some accident hot spots along the highway
- Flood prone area

At most sections, the Federal Route 17 was built under the JKR R5 road standard, allowing maximum speed limit of up to 90 km/h.

There are no overlaps, alternate routes, or sections with motorcycle lanes.

== Interchange and junction lists ==
The following tables lists the major interchanges and intersections along Pasir Gudang Highways. The entire route is located in Johor Bahru District, Johor.

Legend:

- I/C - Interchange, I/S - Intersection, RSA - Rest and service area, OBR - Overhead bridge restaurant, R/R - Restaurant and rest plaza, L/B - Layby, V/P - Vista point, TN - tunnel, T/P - Toll plaza, BR - Bridge
- C - Cloverleaf, S - Stack, T-A - Trumpet-A, T-B - Trumpet-B, DT - Directional-T/Y, SDT - Semi-Directional-T/Y, P-Y - Partial-Y, D - Diamond, P-C - Partial cloverleaf, D-D - Diverging diamond, D-R - Direct ramp

=== Persisiran Perling ===
Subdistrict	km	Exit	Name	Destinations	Notes
Through to Second Link Expressway (Pontian–Johor Barhu Parkway) / AH143
Iskandar Puteri			Elevated U-Turn	U-Turn – Pasir Gudang, Kota Tinggi, Johor Bahru, Woodlands (Singapore)	Elevated U-Turn
Iskandar Puteri	-2.0		Taman Perling; Taman Perling West Exit	Jalan Undan (eastbound only); Jalan Simbang (westbound only)	Left in/left out (LILO) junctions
Iskandar Puteri			Taman Perling	Perling Mall	West bound
Iskandar Puteri			Taman Perling; Taman Perling East Exit	Jalan Undan (eastbound only); Persisiran Perling 2 – Taman Sutera, Kampung Danga, Bukit Indah (westbound only)	Left in/left out (LILO) junctions
MBIP–MBJB border limit		BR	Sungai Skudai bridge		
Johor Bahru			Taman Tampoi Utama Exit	Jalan Sri Perkasa 2 – Taman Tampoi Indah (eastbound only), Taman Tampoi Utama (westbound only)	Left in/left out (LILO) junctions
Johor Bahru			U-Turn I/C	U-Turn – Taman Perling Second Link Expressway (Pontian–Johor Barhu Parkway) / AH143 – Iskandar Puteri, Gelang Patah, Pontian, Port of Tanjung Pelepas, Tuas (Singapore)	U-Turn Interchange

=== Pasir Gudang Highway ===
Subdistrict	km	Exit	Name	Destinations	Notes
Johor Bahru	0.0	1701	Tampoi North I/C	FT 1 Skudai Highway – Kulai, Senai, Senai International Airport, Skudai, City Centre, Woodlands (Singapore); North–South Expressway Southern Route / AH2 – Kuala Lumpur, Malacca	Double U-turn interchange
Johor Bahru			U-Turn	U-Turn	
Johor Bahru		1702A	Damansara Alif Exit	Persiaran Alif Perdana – Bandar Damansara Alif	Left in/left out (LILO) junction Tampoi bound
Johor Bahru		1702B	Kampung Kempas Exit	Kampung Kempas	Left in/left out (LILO) junction Pasir Gudang bound
Johor Bahru		1703	Kempas Highway I/C	J3 Kempas Highway – Kempas, Setia Tropika, City Centre, Tampoi; North–South Expressway Southern Route / AH2 – Kuala Lumpur, Malacca, Senai International Airport	Diamond interchange
Johor Bahru		L/B	Petronas, Shell and BH Petrol L/B	Petronas, Shell and BH Petrol L/B – Petronas Shell BH Petrol	Pasir Gudang bound
Johor Bahru		BR	Railway crossing bridge		
Johor Bahru		1704	Tebrau Industrial Area II I/C	Jalan Firma – Tebrau Industrial Area II, Bandar Dato' Onn	Diamond interchange
Johor Bahru		1705B	Pasir Gudang-NSE I/C	North–South Expressway Southern Route / AH2 – Kuala Lumpur, Malacca, Senai International Airport, Bandar Dato' Onn, Setia Tropika	Expressway interchange From/to Pasir Gudang
Johor Bahru		1705A	Jalan Persisiran Purnama Exit	Jalan Persisiran Purnama – Seri Purnama Industrial Area, Pandan City Mall	Tampoi bound
Johor Bahru		L/B	Petron and BH Petrol L/B	Petron and BH Petrol L/B – BH Petrol Petron	Tampoi bound
Johor Bahru		BR	Sungai Tebrau bridge		
Johor Bahru		L/B	Shell L/B	Shell L/B – Shell	Tampoi bound
Johor Bahru	20.0	1706	Tebrau Industrial Area IV I/C	Jalan Bertam 23 – Taman Daya, Setia Indah, Adda Heights, Road Transport Department (JPJ) Johor state headquarters Jalan Angkasa Mas Utama – Tebrau Industrial Area IV	Diamond interchange
Johor Bahru		BR	Sungai Pandan bridge		
Johor Bahru		L/B	Petron L/B	Petron L/B – Petron	Pasir Gudang bound
Johor Bahru		1707	Johor Jaya I/C	FT 3 / AH18 Johor Bahru–Kota Tinggi Highway – Kota Tinggi, Mersing, Kota Tinggi waterfall, Desaru, Taman Johor Jaya, Taman Molek, City Centre, Woodlands (Singapore)	Multi-level stacked diamond expressway interchange
Johor Bahru		1708	Taman Molek Exit	Jalan Ros Merah 1/1 – Taman Molek	From Pasir Gudang only
Johor Bahru			U-Turn	U-Turn	
Johor Bahru		1709	Plentong I/C	J10 Johor State Route J10 – Plentong, Taman Johor Jaya, Permas Jaya, Giant Hypermarket Plentong, Taman Molek, Tesco Extra Hypermarket	Diamond interchange
Johor Bahru		BR	Sungai Plentong bridge		
Johor Bahru		BR	Sungai Tengkorak bridge		
Johor Bahru		L/B	Caltex L/B	Caltex L/B – Caltex	Tampoi bound
Johor Bahru		1710	Permas Jaya Exit	Jalan Permas Barat – Permas Jaya	Tampoi bound
Johor Bahru		L/B	Petronas Shell L/B	Petronas Shell L/B – Petronas Shell	
Johor Bahru		1711	Sri Alam (West) I/C	Persiaran Seri Alam – Bandar Sri Alam; Jalan Kota – Kota Puteri, Taman Rinting	Diamond interchange
Johor Bahru		L/B	Petron Petronas Shell L/B	Petron Petronas Shell L/B – Petron Petronas Shell	Pasir Gudang bound
Johor Bahru		1712	Kota Puteri Exit	J10 Johor State Route J10 – Masai; Jalan Puteri – Kota Puteri, Taman Rinting	Left in/left out (LILO) junction Both bound
Johor Bahru		1713	Sri Alam (East) I/C	Jalan Seri Alam – Bandar Sri Alam, Universiti Kuala Lumpur (UniKL) Bandar Seri Alam Campus, Tesco Hypermarket Bandar Seri Alam; Jalan Rinting – Taman Rinting, Permas Jaya, Johor Bahru	Diamond interchange
Johor Bahru	MBJB–MBPG border limit		BR	Sungai Rinting bridge	
	BR	Sungai Masai bridge			
Pasir Gudang		1714	Pasir Gudang (North) I/C	Jalan Besar – Taman Dahlia, Taman Mawar, Masjid Jamek Pasir Gudang, Pasir Gudang Recreational Park, Bukit Layang Layang, Muzium Layang Layang, Johor Circuit; Jalan Kampung Pasir Gudang – Kampung Pasir Gudang; FT 35 Malaysia Federal Route 35 – Johor Bahru, Woodlands (Singapore), Bakar Batu, Permas Jaya, Taman Rinting	Diamond interchange
Pasir Gudang		1715	Pasir Gudang (West) I/C	FT 35 Malaysia Federal Route 35 – Johor Bahru, Woodlands (Singapore), Bakar Batu, Permas Jaya, Taman Rinting; Jalan Pekeliling – Malaysian Marine and Heavy Engineering Shipyard, Sultan Iskandar Power Station	Cloverleaf interchange
Pasir Gudang		1716	Pasir Gudang; Jalan Masjid I/C	Jalan Masjid – Kong Kong, Town Centre, Taman Mawar, Taman Dahlia, Masjid Jamek Pasir Gudang, Pasir Gudang Recreational Park, Bukit Layang Layang, Muzium Layang Layang, Johor Circuit	T-junctions
Pasir Gudang			Stadium Perbadanan	Stadium Perbadanan, Stadium Pasir Gudang	Johor Port bound
Pasir Gudang		1717	Pasir Gudang; Jalan Besar I/C	Jalan Besar – Town Centre, Pasir Gudang Recreational Park, Bukit Layang Layang, Muzium Layang Layang, Johor Circuit; Jalan Emas – Pasir Gudang Industrial Area	Junctions
Pasir Gudang		1718	Jalan Gangsa I/C	Jalan Gangsa – Pasir Gudang Industrial Area, Townships, Institut Latihan Perindustrian (ILP) Pasir Gudang, Johor	Junctions
Pasir Gudang		1719	Johor Port I/C	Jalan Pekeliling – Malaysian Marine and Heavy Engineering Shipyard, Sultan Iskandar Power Station; Johor Port – Main terminal, Headquarters and control centre	Junctions

=== Tanjung Langsat Highway ===
The entire route is located in Pasir Gudang subdistrict.

km	Exit	Name	Destinations	Notes
		Johor Port Shipyard I/S	Johor Port Shipyard	T-junctions
		Jalan Besar I/S	Jalan Besar – Pasir Gudang Recreational Park, Bukit Layang Layang, Muzium Layang Layang, Johor Circuit	T-junctions
		Railway crossing		
		Train container depot		
		Jalan Suasa I/S	Jalan Suasa – Sime Sembawang	T-junctions
		Kampung Pasir Puteh I/S	Kampung Pasir Puteh	T-junctions
		TPGCC I/S	Tanjung Puteri Golf and Country Club	T-junctions
		Kota Masai I/S	Jalan Pasir Putih – Kota Masai, Taman Scientex, Masai	T-junctions
	BR	Sungai Kong Kong bridge		
		Tanjung Langsat Industrial Area	Titan Petrochemicals Plant	T-junctions
		Tanjung Langsat Industrial Area	Titan Petrochemicals Plant	T-junctions
		Tanjung Langsat Industrial Area		T-junctions
	I/C	Pasir Gudang-SDE I/C	Senai–Desaru Expressway (Pasir Gudang Link) – Senai International Airport, Ulu Tiram, Kota Tinggi, Kuala Lumpur, Tuas (Singapore), Bandar Penawar, Pengerang, Desaru	Trumpet interchange
		Kampung Perigi Acheh I/S	Kampung Perigi Acheh; Tanjung Langsat Incinerator	T-junctions
	I/S	Tanjung Langsat; Tanjung Langsat I/S	Jalan Perigi Acheh – Kampung Perigi Acheh; Jalan Pekeliling – Port of Tanjung Langsat, Pantai Pasir Layar	T-junctions
