= Johor Bahru–Kota Tinggi Highway =

Road in Malaysia

Federal Route 3
- Johor Bahru–Kota Tinggi Highway; Jalan Tebrau (Tebrau Highway); Jalan Kota Tinggi
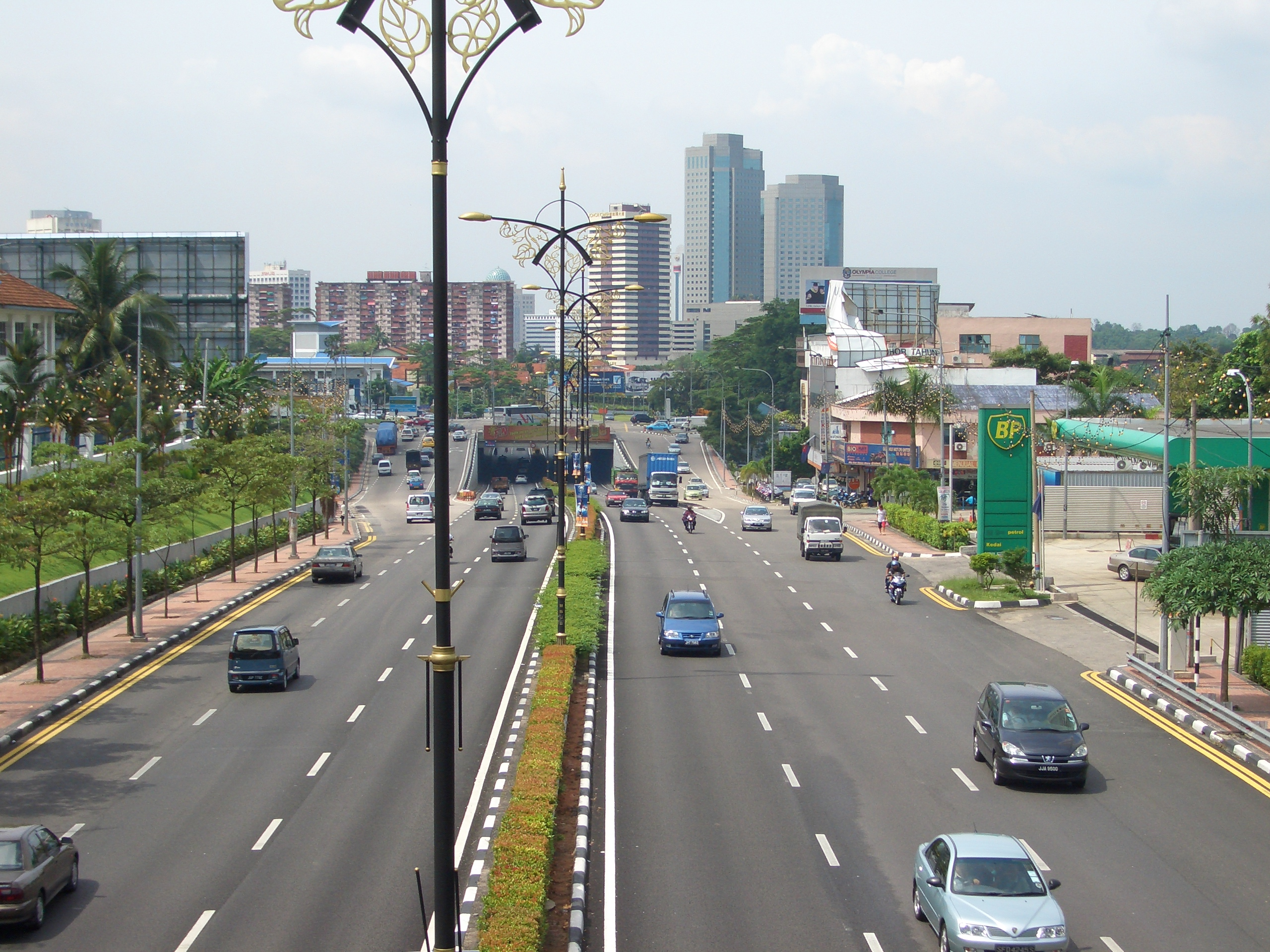
- Tebrau Highway leading to Johor Bahru city centre

Route information
- Part of AH18
- Maintained by Malaysian Public Works Department
- Length: 38 km (24 mi)
- Existed: 1983–present
- History: Completed in 1995

Major junctions
- North end: Kota Tinggi
- FT 91 Federal Route 91 FT 3 / AH18 Federal Route 3/Kota Tinggi Bypass; FT 94 Federal Route 94; FT 1375 Jalan Ulu Tiram; Senai–Desaru Expressway; FT 17 Pasir Gudang Highway; J10 Jalan Masai Lama; North–South Expressway Southern Route / AH2; Johor Bahru Eastern Dispersal Link Expressway / AH2; FT 3374 Jalan Tampoi; J5 Johor Bahru East Coast Parkway; FT 188 Johor Bahru Inner Ring Road; FT 1 Skudai Highway
- South end: Johor Bahru

Location
- Country: Malaysia
- Primary destinations: Mersing, Pengerang, Desaru, Kluang, Kota Tinggi waterfall, Kulai, Ulu Tiram, Pasir Gudang, Johor Jaya, Kampung Melayu Majidee

Highway system
- Highways in Malaysia; Expressways; Federal; State

Johor Bahru–Kota Tinggi Highway (Malay: Lebuhraya Johor Bahru–Kota Tinggi), Federal Route 3, also known as Tebrau Highway (Jalan Tebrau) and Jalan Kota Tinggi is a highway that encompasses Federal Route 3 in Johor Bahru, Malaysia. Part of Asian Highway Route AH18, the highway stretches from its southern end at Jalan Wong Ah Fook and Jalan Tun Abdul Razak in the metropolitan area of Johor Bahru to the northern end at the underpass flyover with North–South Expressway Southern Route and Johor Bahru Eastern Dispersal Link Expressway around Pandan. The stretch of Tebrau Highway after this continues as Jalan Pandan and Jalan Kota Tinggi respectively, beyond Pandan. The highway became the backbone of the Johor Bahru road system linking Pandan to the city centre, and to the Johor–Singapore Causeway, before being surpassed by the Johor Bahru Eastern Dispersal Link Expressway in 2012.

== History ==
Initially constructed in the 1860s, the highway was later extended to Kota Tinggi in 1919. The highway began as a trunk road. It was later widened into a six-lane dual-carriageway, and upgraded during the 1980s. The section between Johor Jaya to Ulu Tiram was upgraded in 1995. Traffic is usually heavy during working hours. Despite the development of newer expressways, such as the Johor Bahru Eastern Dispersal Link Expressway in 2012, the Johor Bahru–Kota Tinggi Highway remains a vital artery in Johor's transportation infrastructure.

== Features ==
The Johor Bahru–Kota Tinggi Highway boasts several notable features:

=== Johor Jaya Interchange ===
In 2003, the government constructed a new flyover at Johor Jaya complex Interchange. At the complex interchange, the road (Jalan Pandan) leads on uphill 50–100 metres north of the interchange. The construction of the interchange elevated the highway directly from the point north of the interchange.

Since 2005, travellers travelling northward would have to turn into a road which connects carrefour before joining the highway after the interchange. Travellers coming from Jalan Masai Bahru would have to take the flyover which connects with Tebrau Highway, and travelling northbound without diverting into the road connecting carrefour would lead to vehicles turning off into Jalan Masai Lama.

After several delays of the project attracting criticism from public, construction on this interchange was completed in June 2007 and it opened for public use.

=== Ulu Tiram–Kota Tinggi road ===
Under the Ninth Malaysia Plan Project and Iskandar Regional Development Authority (IRDA), the main road between Ulu Tiram and Kota Tinggi was upgraded into dual-carriageway. This included the construction of Ulu Tiram Interchange and some bridges along the road. The project was started in March 2009 and completed in 2011.

=== Jalan Tampoi junctions ===
Construction of the Jalan Tampoi directional-T interchange began in 2011 and was completed in 2013.

=== Sungai Tebrau bridge ===
The upgrading works for the Sungai Tebrau bridge near Pandan began in 2013 and was expected to be completed on 2015.

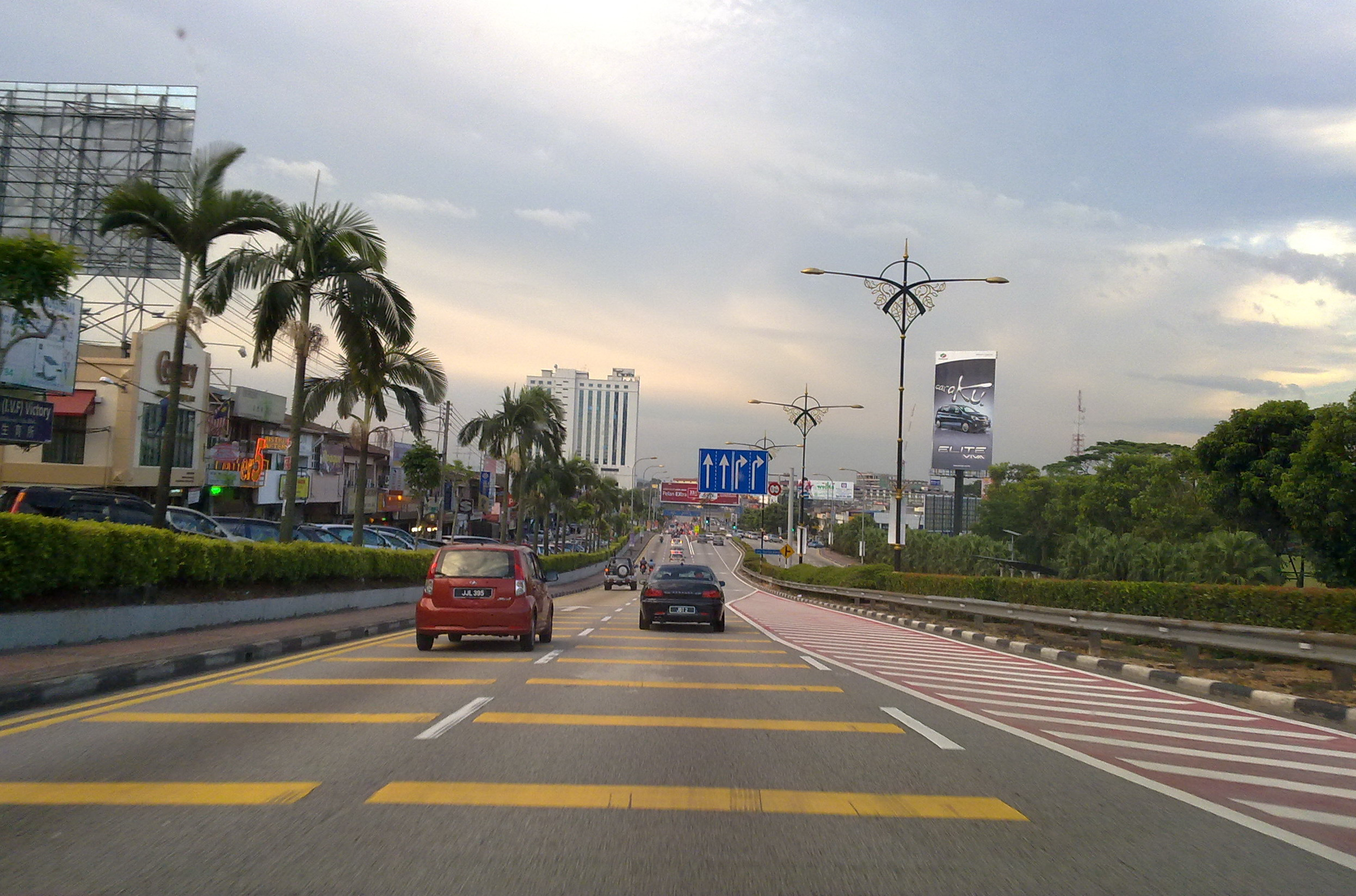
Tebrau Highway leading to Kota Tinggi

== Junction lists ==
The entire route is located in Johor.

Legend:

- I/C - Interchange, I/S - Intersection, RSA - Rest and service area, OBR - Overhead bridge restaurant, R/R - Restaurant and rest plaza, L/B - Layby, V/P - Vista point, TN - tunnel, T/P - Toll plaza, BR - Bridge
- C - Cloverleaf, S - Stack, T-A - Trumpet-A, T-B - Trumpet-B, DT - Directional-T/Y, SDT - Semi-Directional-T/Y, P-Y - Partial-Y, D - Diamond, P-C - Partial cloverleaf, D-D - Diverging diamond, D-R - Direct ramp

District	Location	km	mi	Exit	Name	Destinations	Notes
Kota Tinggi	Kota Tinggi			Through to FT 3 / AH18 Malaysia Federal Route 3/Kota Tinggi Bypass			
Kota Tinggi	Kota Tinggi			325	Kota Tinggi (South) I/S	FT 3 Malaysia Federal Route 3 (Original Route) – Kota Tinggi Town Centre, Tenggara	T-junctions
Kota Tinggi	Kota Tinggi				Training Academy		T-junctions
Kota Tinggi	Kota Tinggi			324	Jalan Kulai I/S	FT 94 Malaysia Federal Route 94 – Kulai, Senai, Senai International Airport, Simpang Renggam	T-junctions
Kota Tinggi	Kota Tinggi			323	Bandar Sri Saujana I/S	Persiaran Sri Saujana – Bandar Sri Saujana	T-junctions
Kota Tinggi	Kota Tinggi				Kota Tinggi fishing centre		T-junctions
Kota Tinggi	Kota Tinggi				PULADA rifle range	PULADA rifle range	T-junctions
Kota Tinggi	Kota Tinggi				PULADA	Malaysian Army Combat Training Centre (PULADA)	T-junctions
Johor Bahru	MBJB				Taman Tiram Jaya	Jalan Tiram – Taman Tiram Jaya	Diamond interchange
Johor Bahru	MBJB				Jalan Resam 9	Jalan Resam 9	Northbound
Johor Bahru	MBJB				Today's Mall	Today's Mall, Ulu Tiram	
Johor Bahru	MBJB	20.0	12.4	–			
Johor Bahru	MBJB	18.0	11.2	322	Ulu Tiram; Ulu Tiram I/C	FT 1375 Malaysia Federal Route 1375 – Sungai Tiram, Kampung Oren, Kulai, Senai	Diamond interchange
Johor Bahru	MBJB			Sungai Tiram bridge			
Johor Bahru	MBJB				Taman Nora	Taman Nora, Caltex	Southbound
Johor Bahru	MBJB			Road Transport Department (JPJ) enforcement stations (southbound)			
Johor Bahru	MBJB			321	Ulu Tiram-SDE I/C	Senai–Desaru Expressway – Senai, Kulai, Senai International Airport, Tuas (Singapore), Kuala Lumpur, Pasir Gudang, Desaru, Pengerang	Trumpet interchange
Johor Bahru	MBJB			320	Puteri Wangsa I/C	Jalan Puteri – Taman Puteri Wangsa, McDonald's	Diamond interchange
Johor Bahru	MBJB			319	Desa Cemerlang I/S	Jalan Cemerlang – Desa Cemerlang	T-junctions
Johor Bahru	MBJB			318	Pelangi Indah-Desa Cemerlang I/C	Persiaran Pelangi Indah – Taman Pelangi Indah, Taman Gaya, Taman Gaya, Mydin; Jalan Lebuh Cemerlang – Taman Desa Cemerlang, Taman Ehsan Jaya, Ehsan Heights	Single-point urban interchange
Johor Bahru	MBJB				Taman Desa Jaya I/S Exit	Jalan Desa Jaya – Taman Ehsan Jaya, Ehsan Heights, Taman Desa Jaya	Southbound; LILO
Johor Bahru	MBJB			317	Taman Johor Jaya I/C	Persiaran Bandar Desa Tebrau – Desa Tebrau, IKEA Tebrau, JB, Toppen, AEON Tebrau City, Plentong, Taman Ehsan Jaya; Jalan Johor Jaya – Taman Johor Jaya	Diamond interchange
Johor Bahru	MBJB			Taman Johor Jaya L/B – Caltex (southbound)			
Johor Bahru	MBJB			Shell L/B (northbound)			
Johor Bahru	MBJB				Jalan Persiaran Desa Tebrau	Jalan Persiaran Desa Tebrau – IKEA Tebrau, JB, Toppen, AEON Tebrau City, Tesco Extra Tebrau City	Northbound
Johor Bahru	MBJB			316	Taman Mount Austin I/C	Jalan Mutiara Emas Utama – Taman Mount Austin, Taman Daya, Setia Indah, Hospital Sultan Ismail	Directional-T interchange
Johor Bahru	MBJB			315	Johor Jaya flyover Johor Jaya I/C	FT 17 Pasir Gudang Highway – Tampoi, Skudai, Senai International Airport, Kulai, Bandar Sri Alam, Pasir Gudang, Tanjung Langsat, Johor Port Second Link Expressway / AH143 – Tuas (Singapore), Iskandar Puteri; North–South Expressway Southern Route / AH2 – Kuala Lumpur, Malacca	Multi-level stacked diamond interchange
Johor Bahru	MBJB			314	Johor Jaya flyover Jalan Masai Lama I/S	J10 Johor State Route J10 – Taman Molek, Plentong	Below flyover junctions
Johor Bahru	MBJB				Tebrau Industrial Park IV	Jalan WAJA 6 – Tebrau Industrial Park IV, McDonald's, S'Mart hypermarket, Carrefour hypermarket	T-junctions
Johor Bahru	MBJB				Pandan army camp	The Store Pandan, Pandan army camp	Southbound
Johor Bahru	MBJB				U-Turn	U-Turn	
Johor Bahru	MBJB			313B	TLDM KD Sri Medini naval camp	TLDM KD Sri Medini naval camp	Southbound
Johor Bahru	MBJB				Persiaran Molek Utama Exit	Persiaran Bumi Hijau – Taman Redang, Taman Molek, Ponderosa Golf and Country Club	Southbound; LILO
Johor Bahru	MBJB				Kampung Penggawa Timur		Northbound
Johor Bahru	MBJB			Shell L/B (northbound)			
Johor Bahru	MBJB			313	Jalan Kangkar Tebrau	J101 Jalan Kangkar Tebrau – Kangkar Tebrau, Taman Delima, Taman Daya, Setia Indah	Northbound; LILO
Johor Bahru	MBJB				Kampung Melayu Pandan	Jalan Masjid – Kampung Melayu Pandan	Southbound
Johor Bahru	MBJB				Kampung Pandan	Jalan Loo Hong Joon (Jalan Sendayan) – Kampung Pandan	Northbound
Johor Bahru	MBJB			Sungai Tebrau bridge			
Johor Bahru	MBJB				Pasar Borong Pandan	Jalan Pandan Ria Utama – Pasar Borong Pandan	Northbound
Johor Bahru	MBJB				Taman Sri Pandan	Jalan Tebrau Lama – Taman Sri Pandan	Southbound
Johor Bahru	MBJB			312	Pandan-NSE I/C	North–South Expressway Southern Route / AH2 – Kuala Lumpur, Malacca, Senai International Airport, Setia Tropika, Bandar Dato' Onn; Johor Bahru Eastern Dispersal Link Expressway / AH2 – Woodlands (Singapore), Sultan Iskandar Building CIQ Complex, Permas Jaya, City Centre	Cloverleaf interchange with one ramp to Johor Bahru
Johor Bahru	MBJB				Jalan Kangkar Tebrau	J101 Johor State Route J101 – Kawasan Perindustrian Seri Purnama	Northbound; LILO
Johor Bahru	MBJB				Taman Sri Amar	Jalan Bawang – Taman Sri Amar	Southbound
Johor Bahru	MBJB			311	Jalan Tampoi I/C	FT 3374 Jalan Tampoi – Tampoi, Kempas, Larkin, Bandar Baru Uda	Directional-T interchange
Johor Bahru	MBJB			Petron L/B (southbound)			
Johor Bahru	MBJB				Majidee Malay Village	Jalan Tebrau Lama – Majidee Malay Village	Northbound; LILO
Johor Bahru	MBJB			Petronas L/B (northbound)			
Johor Bahru	MBJB			310	Kampung Melayu Majidee I/S	Jalan Utama – Kampung Melayu Majidee; Jalan Rebung – Kampung Bendahara	Junctions
Johor Bahru	MBJB				Kampung Bendahara	Jalan Bayam	Southbound; LILO
Johor Bahru	MBJB				Kampung Stulang Baru	Jalan Tebrau Lama – Kampung Stulang Baru	Northbound
Johor Bahru	MBJB			Sungai Sebulong bridge			
Johor Bahru	MBJB				Taman Putera	Jalan Suria – Taman Putera, Taman Suria	Northbound; LILO
Johor Bahru	MBJB			309	Southern City I/S	Jalan Suria Utama – Southern City, Taman Suria, Sekolah Kebangsaan Taman Suria; Jalan Bunga Ros – Kampung Dato' Sulaiman Menteri, Kampung Majidee Baru, SMK Tun Syed Nasir Ismail	Junctions
Johor Bahru	MBJB			Mutiara Motors L/B – Petron, Mutiara Motors (southbound)			
Johor Bahru	MBJB			Sungai Tampoi bridge			
Johor Bahru	MBJB			Shell L/B (northbound)			
Johor Bahru	MBJB				Jalan Seri Setanggi	Jalan Seri Setanggi – Taman Seri Setanggi, 1Tebrau, Kampung Tok Siak	Southbound
Johor Bahru	MBJB			308	Jalan Kebun Teh I/S	Jalan Kebun Teh – Larkin, Tampoi	T-junctions
Johor Bahru	MBJB				Jalan Pesiaran Southkey 5	Jalan Pesiaran Southkey 5 – Colombia Asia Hospital Tebrau	Left-in/left-out
Johor Bahru	MBJB				Jalan Chengai	Jalan Chengai – Taman Kebun Teh	Northbound
Johor Bahru	MBJB			307	Jalan Bakar Batu I/S	J5 Jalan Bakar Batu – Permas Jaya, Pasir Gudang, Pasir Pelangi, Stulang, Southkey City	T-junctions
Johor Bahru	MBJB			306	Taman Sentosa I/S	Jalan Sutera – Taman Sentosa	T-junctions
Johor Bahru	MBJB				Jalan Beringin	Jalan Beringin – Taman Kebun Teh	Northbound
Johor Bahru	MBJB			Sungai Sengkuang bridge			
Johor Bahru	MBJB			305	Jalan Dato' Sulaiman I/S	Jalan Dato Sulaiman – Taman Century; Jalan Keris – Taman Sri Tebrau	Junctions; No turn right from Jalan Keris
Johor Bahru	MBJB			304	Jalan Serampang I/S	Jalan Serampang – Taman Pelangi, Pasir Pelangi, Stulang, Pelangi Leisure Mall	T-junctions
Johor Bahru	MBJB				Jalan Abiad	Jalan Abiad – Taman Abiad, Taman Pelangi	Southbound
Johor Bahru	MBJB				Jalan Maju	Jalan Maju – Taman Maju, Taman Pelangi, Plaza Pelangi	Southbound
Johor Bahru	MBJB			303	Plaza Pelangi I/S	Jalan Harimau – Taman Century; Jalan Kuning – Taman Pelangi, Plaza Pelangi	Junctions; No turn right from Jalan Kuning
Johor Bahru	MBJB				Hotel Selesa (formerly Hotel Grand Continental)	Jalan Dato' Abdullah Tahir – Hotel Selesa	Northbound; LILO
Johor Bahru	MBJB				Jalan Dato Abdullah Tahir	Jalan Dato Abdullah Tahir – Taman Abad	Northbound
Johor Bahru	MBJB				Royal Malaysia Police Johor contingent headquarters	Royal Malaysia Police Johor contingent headquarters Tunku Laksamana Abdul Jalil Mosque	Southbound
Johor Bahru	MBJB			302	The Astaka I/C	FT 188 Johor Bahru Inner Ring Road – Tampoi, Skudai, Senai International Airport, Kulai, Iskandar Puteri, Jalan Yahya Awal, Dataran Bandaraya, Stulang, Woodlands (Singapore); Johor Bahru Eastern Dispersal Link Expressway / AH2 – Kuala Lumpur, Malacca, Permas Jaya, Pasir Gudang	Multi-level stacked diamond interchange
Johor Bahru	MBJB	1.1	0.68		Jalan Storey	Jalan Storey	Southbound; LILO
Johor Bahru	MBJB	1.0	0.62	–			
Johor Bahru	MBJB	0.0	0.0	301	Johor Bahru; Landmark I/C	FT 1 Skudai Highway – Tampoi, Skudai, Senai, Senai International Airport, Kulai, Johor Bahru City Square, JB Sentral, Komtar JBCC	Cloverleaf interchange Southern terminus of concurrency with AH18
1.000 mi = 1.609 km; 1.000 km = 0.621 mi: Concurrency terminus; Incomplete access

== See also ==
- Federal Route 3
- Malaysian Expressway System
- Malaysian Federal Roads System
