= Johor Bahru Eastern Dispersal Link Expressway =

Expressway in Johor Bahru, Johor, Malaysia

Expressway 14
- Johor Bahru Eastern Dispersal Link Expressway; Lebuhraya Penyebaran Timur Johor Bahru 新山东部疏散大道
- EDL in red

Route information
- Part of AH2
- Maintained by the Malaysian Public Works Department
- Length: 8.1 km (5.0 mi)
- Existed: 2007–present
- History: Completed in 2012

Major junctions
- North end: North–South Expressway Southern Route at Pandan-Tebrau, Johor
- FT 3 Tebrau Highway; FT 35 Johor Bahru East Coast Highway; J5 Johor Bahru East Coast Parkway; FT 188 Johor Bahru Inner Ring Road
- South end: BKE at the Johor–Singapore Causeway

Location
- Country: Malaysia
- Primary destinations: Permas Jaya, Kampung Bakar Batu, Pasir Pelangi, Stulang

Highway system
- Highways in Malaysia; Expressways; Federal; State

Johor Bahru Eastern Dispersal Link Expressway

The Johor Bahru Eastern Dispersal Link Expressway E14 FT38 is a controlled-access highway entirely within Johor Bahru, Johor, Malaysia. The 8.1-kilometre (5.0-mile) expressway connects the end of the North–South Expressway Southern Route at Pandan to the Johor–Singapore Causeway in the city centre. The expressway was constructed to allow cross-border traffic to bypass the city centre and reduce congestion along Tebrau Highway, the existing main route to the causeway. The construction costs of the expressway is RM 1 billion.

In August 2012, the Malaysian government decided that it will acquire the expressway from Malaysia Resources Corp Bhd (MRCB).

The Kilometre Zero of the entire expressway is located after the CIQ Interchange before the Sultan Iskandar Building towards the Malaysia-Singapore border.

== History ==
=== Construction ===
The construction of the Johor Bahru Eastern Dispersal Link was proposed in 2004 in the Ninth Malaysia Plan (2006–2010). The construction began on 1 October 2007 and was completed on 20 March 2012. On 1 April 2012, the highway was opened to public, delayed from its scheduled launch in the first quarter of 2012.

=== Government Acquirement ===
Talk of the government to acquire EDL had been ongoing since August 2012. In December 2017, the government terminated the EDL concession agreement and agreed to take over the highway, resulting in toll collections at the EDL being abolished since January 2018. In November 2018, the government announced that it will take over the Eastern Dispersal Link (EDL) expressway from Malaysian Resources Corp Bhd (MRCB) for RM1.3 billion in Budget 2019.

== Features ==
=== Lane numbers ===
The entire section adopts six lanes, three lanes in each direction.

=== Speed limits ===
Johor Bahru Eastern Dispersal Link Expressway is designed as an urban dispersal link expressway. Therefore, the default speed limit on the expressway is 90 km/h (56 mph), but there are some exceptions in some places for several reasons, including:-

- Pandan Interchange: 110 km/h (68 mph) (continuous with North–South Expressway Southern Route)
- Sultan Iskandar Building (CIQ): 60 km/h (37 mph) (approaching to toll and CIQ)

== Controversies ==
Houses along Jalan Sri Pelangi Satu and Jalan Sri Pelangi Dua had been reclaimed by the government due to the necessity to use the land for the project. The compensation sum given to the owners of the houses was considered low by many of the residents there. However, no further adjustments was made to the sum.

Another major controversy is that only the motorists who use the CIQ complex to travel to Singapore will be charged the toll; whether or not the Johor Bahru Eastern Disperal Link is used. However, on 30 August 2012, five months after the EDL was opened to public, the controversy was resolved when the government announced that they will take over the EDL from MRCB. On 1 January 2018, toll collections at EDL was abolished and replaced by Road Charge on every Singaporean-registered car that enters Malaysia. The EDL is gazetted as Federal Route 38, however the existing code E14 is still well known.

== Interchange lists ==
Below is a list of interchanges (exits), laybys and rest and service areas along the Johor Bahru Eastern Dispersal Link Expressway. The exits are arranged in ascending numerical order from north to south.

The entire section is located within the district of Johor Bahru, Johor.

Legend:

- I/C - Interchange, I/S - Intersection, RSA - Rest and service area, OBR - Overhead bridge restaurant, R/R - Restaurant and rest plaza, L/B - Layby, V/P - Vista point, TN - tunnel, T/P - Toll plaza, BR - Bridge
- C - Cloverleaf, S - Stack, T-A - Trumpet-A, T-B - Trumpet-B, DT - Directional-T/Y, SDT - Semi-Directional-T/Y, P-Y - Partial-Y, D - Diamond, P-C - Partial cloverleaf, D-D - Diverging diamond, D-R - Direct ramp

Location	km	mi	Exit	Name	Destinations	Notes
Pandan			Through to North–South Expressway Southern Route / AH2			
Pandan			1404	Pandan I/C	FT 3 (Tebrau Highway) / AH18 – City Centre, Tampoi, Mersing, Kota Tinggi	
Pandan	6.6	4.1	Pandan RSA (southbound)			
Pandan			Anak Sungai Sebulong bridge			
Pandan			Pandan RSA (southbound)			
Pandan			Sungai Sebulong bridge			
		Sungai Tampoi bridge				
		Mid Valley Southkey				
Bakar Batu			1402	Bakar Batu I/C	FT 35 Johor Bahru East Coast Highway – Permas Jaya, Pasir Gudang; J5 Johor Bahru East Coast Parkway - Bakar Batu, Taman Sentosa	
CIQ	0.0	0.0	1401	CIQ I/C	FT 188 Johor Bahru Inner Ring Road – City Centre, Skudai, Stulang	
CIQ			Sultan Iskandar Building (CIQ); Accepts electronic toll payment (Touch 'n Go) only			
CIQ			Through to AH2 Johor Causeway			
1.000 mi = 1.609 km; 1.000 km = 0.621 mi: Concurrency terminus; Electronic toll collection
