= Pelentong River =

Pelentong River may refer to:

- Pelentong River (Johor)
- Pelentong River (Negeri Sembilan)
