= Permas Jaya Bridge =

Permas Jaya Bridge Jambatan Permas Jaya جمبتن ڤرمس جاي
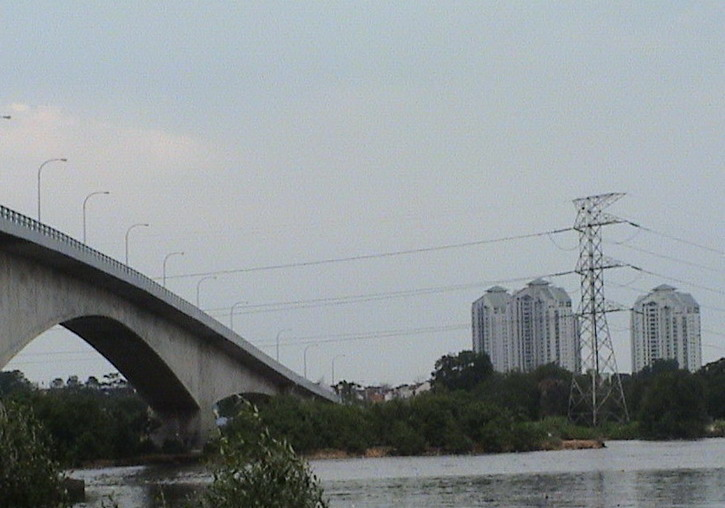
- Coordinates: 1°29′45″N 103°47′52″E
- Carries: Motor vehicles, Pedestrians
- Crosses: Tebrau River and Pelentong River
- Locale: FT 35 Johor Bahru East Coast Highway, Plentong
- Official name: Permas Jaya Bridge
- Maintained by: Malaysian Public Works Department (JKR) Johor Bahru; Majlis Bandaraya Johor Bahru (MBJB)

Characteristics
- Design: arch bridge
- Total length: 1.5 km
- Width: --
- Longest span: --

History
- Designer: Bandar Raya Developments Berhad (BRDB)
- Constructed by: Permas Jaya Bridge; 1992-1994; Bandar Raya Developments Berhad (BRDB) Second Permas Jaya Bridge; 2008-2012; Government of Malaysia; Malaysian Public Works Department (JKR)
- Opened: 1994

Permas Jaya Bridge or Jambatan Permas Jaya (Jawi: جمبتن ڤرمس جاي) is a river bridge in arch shape in Plentong, Johor Bahru District, Johor, Malaysia. The bridge crosses Tebrau River and Plentong River. The bridge is built to shorten the travel distance between Bandar Baru Permas Jaya to Johor bahru city area from 18 km (estimated) to 6 km (estimated). The bridge was once the longest Arch bridge in Southeast Asia in 1994, which is about 1.5 km long.

== History ==
The construction of the bridge was proposed when Bandar Baru Permas Jaya, a new neighborhood town was first launched by the property company Bandar Raya Developments Berhad (BRDB) in 1984, however, the bridge was only completed in 1994.

== The new second Permas Jaya Bridge ==
The construction of the new second Permas Jaya Bridge was proposed in 2006 under the Iskandar Development Region plan to provide a direct connection to the Johor Bahru East Coast Highway. Construction started in February 2008.

The bridge was completed and opened to road users on 1 March 2012.

== See also ==
- Permas Jaya
