= Johor Bahru East Coast Parkway =

Road in Malaysia

Johor Route 5

Major junctions
- North end: FT 3 (Tebrau Highway) / AH18

- FT 3 (Tebrau Highway) / AH18; Johor Bahru Eastern Dispersal Link Expressway / FT 38 / AH2; FT 35 Permas Jaya–Pasir Gudang Road; FT 188 Johor Bahru Inner Ring Road
- South end: Sultan Iskandar Building (CIQ)

Location
- Country: Malaysia
- Primary destinations: Kampung Bakar Batu, Permas Jaya, Plentong, Masai, Pasir Gudang, Taman Sentosa, Pasir Pelangi, Stulang

Highway system
- Highways in Malaysia; Expressways; Federal; State

Johor Bahru East Coast Parkway or the stretch of roads that includes Jalan Bakar Batu, Jalan Pasir Pelangi and Jalan Stulang Baru (Johor State Route J5) are the major roads located in Johor Bahru city, Johor, Malaysia.

== Junction lists ==
The entire route is located in Johor Bahru District, Johor.

Legend:

- I/C - Interchange, I/S - Intersection, RSA - Rest and service area, OBR - Overhead bridge restaurant, R/R - Restaurant and rest plaza, L/B - Layby, V/P - Vista point, TN - tunnel, T/P - Toll plaza, BR - Bridge
- C - Cloverleaf, S - Stack, T-A - Trumpet-A, T-B - Trumpet-B, DT - Directional-T/Y, SDT - Semi-Directional-T/Y, P-Y - Partial-Y, D - Diamond, P-C - Partial cloverleaf, D-D - Diverging diamond, D-R - Direct ramp

Location	km	mi	Name	Destinations	Notes
Johor Bahru			Tebrau Highway	FT 3 (Tebrau Highway) / AH18 – Mersing, Kota Tinggi, Desaru, Pasir Gudang, Bandar Sri Alam, Kota Tinggi waterfall, City Centre, Woodlands (Singapore); North–South Expressway Southern Route / AH2 – Kuala Lumpur, Malacca	T-junctions
Johor Bahru			Taman Sentosa	Jalan Benang 5 – Taman Sentosa	T-junctions
Johor Bahru			Southkey City	Persiaran Southkey – Southkey Mosaic Serviced Apartment, Southkey Mid Valley Megamall	T-junctions
Johor Bahru			Kampung Bakar Batu	FT 35 Permas Jaya–Pasir Gudang Road – Permas Jaya, Plentong, Masai, Pasir Gudang; Johor Bahru Eastern Dispersal Link Expressway / FT 38 / AH2 – Kuala Lumpur, Malacca, Senai International Airport, Setia Tropika, Bandar Dato' Onn, Mersing, Kota Tinggi, City Centre, Sultan Iskandar Building (CIQ Complex) Woodlands (Singapore)	T-junctions
Johor Bahru			Taman Sentosa	Jalan Sutera – Taman Sentosa	LILO Northbound
Johor Bahru			Taman Iskandar	Jalan Sultanah Aminah – Taman Iskandar	T-junctions
Johor Bahru			Pasir Pelangi Royal Mosque		
Johor Bahru			Kelab Polo Diraja		
Johor Bahru			Kelab Lumba Kuda Diraja	Best 104, Kelab Lumba Kuda Diraja	
Johor Bahru			Istana Tengku Mahkota Johor		
Johor Bahru			Pasir Pelangi	Jalan Serampang – Taman Pelangi, Pelangi Leisure Mall	T-junctions
Johor Bahru			Istana Pasir Pelangi		
Johor Bahru			Jalan Stulang Laut	Jalan Stulang Laut – Stulang,Duty Free Complex	T-junctions
Johor Bahru			Taman Pelangi	Jalan Biru – Taman Pelangi, Plaza Pelangi	LILO Northbound
Johor Bahru			EDL Flyover	Johor Bahru Eastern Dispersal Link Expressway / FT 38 / AH2 – Kuala Lumpur, Malacca	From CIQ
Johor Bahru			EDL-Sultan Iskandar Building	see also Johor Bahru Eastern Dispersal Link Expressway / FT 38 / AH2	
1.000 mi = 1.609 km; 1.000 km = 0.621 mi: Concurrency terminus; Incomplete access
