= Kampung Bakar Batu =

- Location within Johor
- Coordinates: 1.50023°N 103.77891°E
- Country: Malaysia
- State: Johor
- District: Johor Bahru
- City: Johor Bahru

Bakar Batu or Kampung Bakar Batu (also spelled Kampung Tebrau Bakar Batu and Kampung Bakar Batu Tebrau) is a small village in Johor Bahru, Johor, Malaysia. It is situated between, Kampung Melayu Majidee, Taman Sentosa and Permas Jaya.

The village is first was explored by the Malays and Javanese.

At first they worked in rubber plantations owned by late Sultan Ibrahim Johore in the 19th and 20th centuries. After so many years of work in rubber plantations, eventually they find a place to stay on the outskirts of the forest estate, which was then known as Terbrau Bakar Batu. Now this small village is surrounding by housing estates like Pasir Pelangi, the royal village, Taman Iskandar, Taman Sentosa, Permas Jaya and more.

== Transportation ==
The area is accessible by Muafakat Bus route P-102 and P-103.

== See also ==
- Johor Bahru East Coast Parkway
- Kampung Melayu Majidee
