= Kangkar Tebrau =

Village in Johor Bahru, Johor, Malaysia

Coordinates: 1°31′45.7″N 103°45′33.7″E

Kangkar Tebrau is a village in Tebrau, Johor Bahru, Johor, Malaysia. This village is located about 10 km from Johor Bahru.
