= Pandan, Johor =

Village in Malaysia

Coordinates: 1°31′30.2″N 103°46′08.5″E

Pandan (Chinese: 班兰) is a Chinese New village in Johor Bahru District, Malaysia comprising Pandan town, the first kangchu settlement in Johor, Kangkar Tebrau which was established in 1844 and several large housing estates in the vicinity namely:

- Taman Johor Jaya
- Taman Molek
- Taman Daya
- Taman Mount Austin
- Desa Tebrau
- Setia Indah
- Taman Istimewa

Besides residential areas there are several major industrial areas here including Tebrau I, II, III and IIII as well as industrial zones within the major housing estates.

There are also several major shopping establishments such as Jusco AEON Tebrau City, the third largest in Malaysia (after Aeon Bukit Tinggi, and AEON Bukit Raja) NSK, Johor Bahru Wholesale Market and 2 Store outlets.

The Sultan Ismail Specialist Hospital is also located here. The area is set to see much larger growth in the future due to its strategic location.

== History ==
In July 2025, a large fire destroyed eight shops in the village.

== Education ==
SJK (C) Pandan is the only school in this area.
