= Pelentong River (Negeri Sembilan) =

River in Negeri Sembilan, Malaysia

Coordinates: 2°37′N 102°12′E

- Native name: Sungai Pelentong (Malay)

Location
- Country: Malaysia
- State: Negeri Sembilan

Pelentong River (Malay: Sungai Pelentong or Sungei Plentong) is a river in Negeri Sembilan, Malaysia.

== See also ==
- List of rivers of Malaysia
