= Johor–Singapore Causeway =

Border connection between Peninsular Malaysia and Singapore

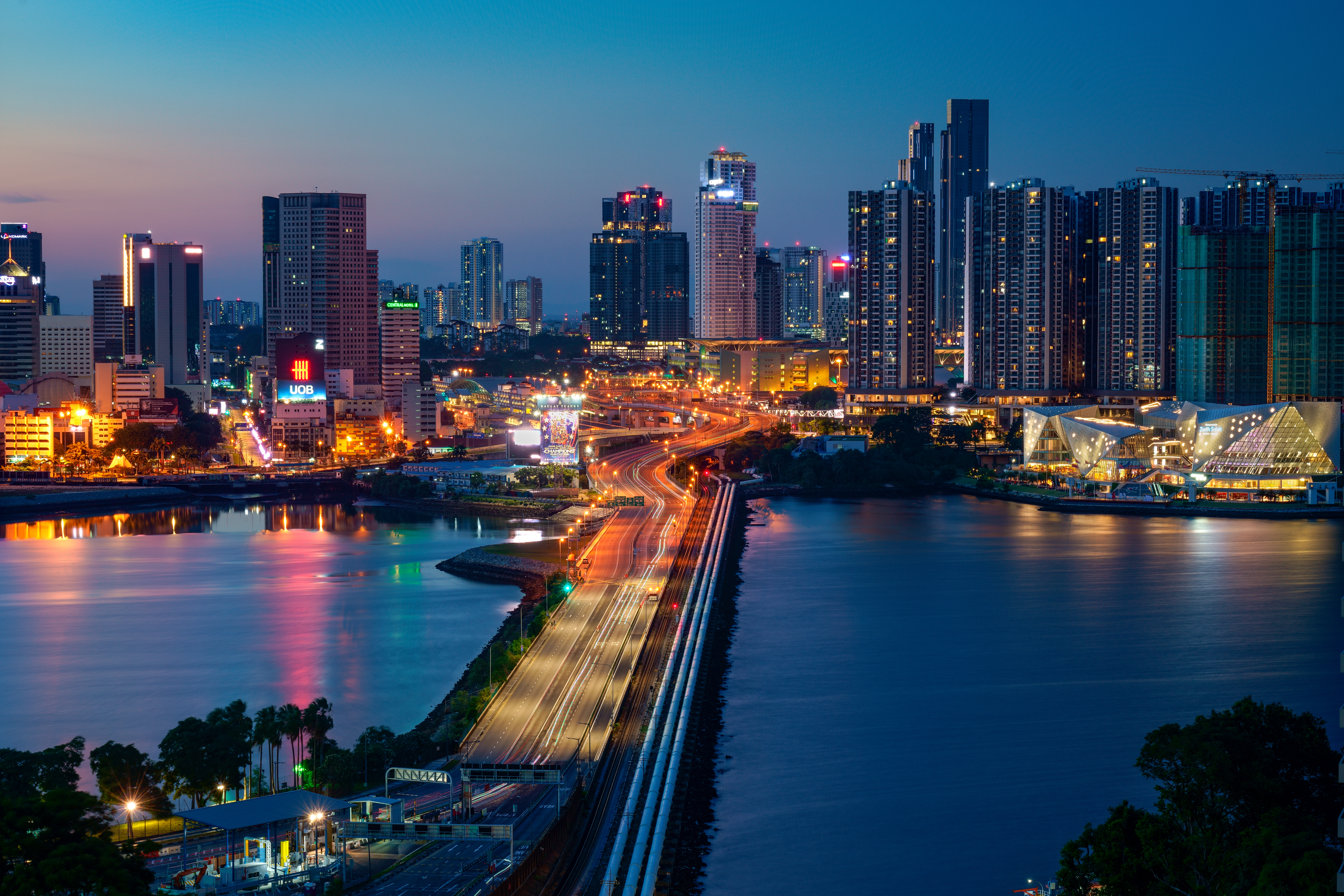
- The Johor–Singapore Causeway. The end of Singaporean territory in the foreground and start of Malaysian territory in the background can be seen with the differences in road surface, street lights, and markings near the midsection of the Causeway.
- Coordinates: 1°27′10″N 103°46′09″E
- Carries: Motor vehicles; Bicycles; Trains; Pedestrians
- Crosses: Straits of Johor
- Locale: Johor Bahru, Johor, Malaysia, Bangunan Sultan Iskandar; Woodlands, Singapore, Woodlands Checkpoint
- Official name: Johor–Singapore Causeway
- Maintained by: PLUS Expressways (Malaysia); Land Transport Authority (Singapore)

Characteristics
- Design: Causeway
- Material: Rubble
- Total length: 1 km (0.62 mi) (Causeway) 2.4 km (1.5 mi) (Distance between both checkpoints)

Rail characteristics
- No. of tracks: 1
- Track gauge: 1,000 mm (3 ft 3 3/8 in)
- Electrified: No

History
- Construction start: August 1919
- Construction end: 17 September 1923
- Construction cost: 17 million Straits dollars (1918)
- Opened: 28 June 1924
- Inaugurated: 28 June 1924

Location
- Interactive map of Johor–Singapore Causeway

Johor–Singapore Causeway

Chinese name
- Chinese: 新柔長堤
Transcriptions
Standard Mandarin
- Hanyu Pinyin: Xīn róu cháng dī

Malay name
- Malay: Tambak Johor–Singapura

Tamil name
- Tamil: ஜோகூர்-சிங்கப்பூர் காஸ்வே Jōkūr-Ciṅkappūr kāsvē

The Johor–Singapore Causeway is a 1.056-kilometre (0.66 mi) causeway across the Straits of Johor. The Causeway links Johor Bahru in Malaysia to Woodlands in Singapore. It is one of the busiest border crossings in the world, with 300,000 road and rail travelers daily. It also carries a water pipeline between the two countries.

The Causeway officially opened in 1923. Its construction interrupted the water flow through the Straits of Johor, especially after the lock channel was permanently closed following World War II. Retreating Allied forces detonated the Causeway in two places in World War II, forcing the advancing Imperial Japanese Army to instead cross the Straits elsewhere.

The Causeway first became an international border when the Federation of Malaya achieved independence on 31 August 1957. The Causeway then became an internal state border when the Federation of Malaya, Singapore, Sabah and Sarawak merged to form Malaysia on 16 September 1963. After Singapore's separation from Malaysia on 9 August 1965, The Causeway became the border connector between the two countries. The Causeway was the only land connection across the Straits of Johor until 1998 when the Tuas Second Link opened.

The border is managed by immigration authorities of both countries at the Southern Integrated Gateway (Malaysia) and Woodlands Checkpoint (Singapore) respectively. The distance between the checkpoints across The Causeway is approximately 2.4 km (1.5 mi).

== History ==
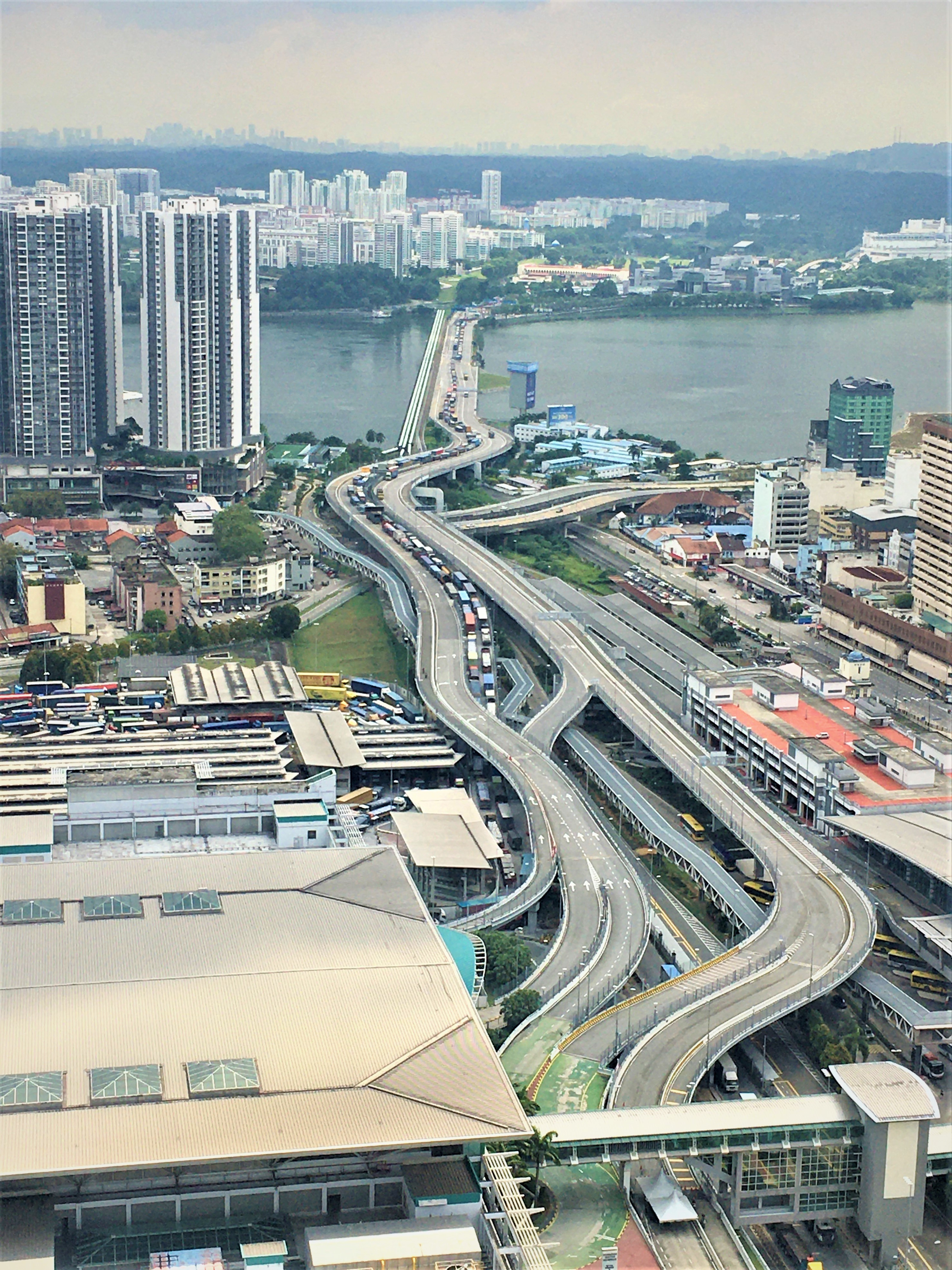
The causeway from the Johor, Malaysia side facing the direction of Woodlands, Singapore.

=== Construction and opening ===
In the late 19th century, Singapore was transformed into a major international trading port and was a steamship coaling station. At the turn of the 20th century, British Malaya was transformed into a major producer and exporter of raw materials such as tin, rubber, gambier, and pepper for international markets. The connection to Singapore from Johor was through a ferry link. Railways across the peninsula, and in Singapore from the ferry point to Tank Road in the south of Singapore completed the trade transport network within British Malaya. From June 1909 onward, goods were transported on wagon-ferry, while passengers were transported on passenger ferries (3 ferries from 1912 onward, 2 ferries before 1912). The wagon-ferry could accommodate 6 wagons at a time, while the passenger ferries had a capacity of about 160 each. As international trade demands grew, it was necessary to operate the ferry link round-the-clock in 1911 to bring the commodities from British Malaya into Singapore to be transshipped. Additional ferry steamers were constructed, however they soon were overloaded. The passenger steamers often had to exceed its designed limits, carrying "as many as 250 passengers". Additionally, the increasing costs of the maintaining the ferries were a concern on the long-term viability of the ferries. The annual expenditure in 1912 was estimated to be 53,750 Straits dollars (£1.8 million in 2000).

In 1917, Federated Malay States (FMS) Director of Public Works, W. Eyre Kenny's proposal to build a rubble causeway gained support among the Federal Council of the FMS. His suggestion was to have the foundation laid in the soft "white and pink clays" at the proposed site, have an opening span for ships to be allowed through the bridge, and have the rubble sourced from the quarries at Pulau Ubin and Bukit Timah as there were ample granite being sold at reasonable prices. Among the alternatives to the Causeway design were a bridge or upgrading the wagon-ferries and train ferries. The bridge proposal wasn't followed through because the Straits was too deep, going at 70 feet (21 m) at some points and foundations would be lacking. An opening span would be required, and the bridge would require significant maintenance. The train ferries to replace the wagon-ferries would be too expensive as well.

The causeway proposal was accepted by FMS Chief Secretary and Straits Settlements Colonial Secretary, Edward Lewis Brockman, and Straits Settlements Governor and FMS High Commissioner, Sir Arthur Henderson Young. In 1917, Governor Young cited the six-fold increase in railway receipts in Singapore from 82,000 Straits dollars (£2.7 million in 2000) in 1912 to 480,000 Straits dollars (£11.8 million in 2000) in 1916 as an evidence to the rapid growth of the railway traffic, and thus the FMS Railway Administration could not defer any longer on the improvement works required. The British government had consultant engineers Messrs Coode, Fitzmaurice, Wilson & Mitchell of Westminster to prepare plans for the eventual Causeway. The plans were presented to the FMS, Straits Settlements and Johore governments in 1918. The plan was approved in 1919 after the sharing of the costs of constructing the Causeway, was negotiated between the three governments.

By the engineering standards of its time, the Causeway was a technically challenging project. It was also one of the largest engineering projects in Malaya then. Many considerations were factored for the finalised design. Tidal studies were carried out prior to the construction and design features were incorporated in consideration to the structure itself, its surroundings, and continued ship passage through the Straits. The orientation also factored in the current railway terminations on both shores. The design would be 3,465 feet long, 60 feet wide, sufficient for two lines of metre-gauge railway tracks and a 26 foot wide roadway, with space reserved for laying of water mains at a later date. Floodgates were incorporated at the lock to control the tides.

The construction contract was awarded to Messrs Topham, Jones & Railton Ltd of London on 30 June 1919. The engineering firm had completed major works at the dockyards and harbour in Singapore, and had necessary work capacity and experience in the area available. The contract allowed the firm a period of 5 years and 3 months to complete the construction. Construction started in August 1919, starting with the lock at Johore's bank. Sequence of construction would allow minimal disruption to existing shipping or ferrying services.

On 24 April 1920, a ceremony was held to mark the laying of the foundation stone. The Johore Sultan, Sultan Ibrahim, the newly appointed Governor of Straits Settlements and High Commissioner of the FMS, Sir Laurence Guillemard, his wife among other invited guests graced the ceremony on board Sea Belle, a sea yacht, in the middle of the Straits. The ceremony commenced with prayers and Governor Guillemard was invited to pull a silken cord which activated machinery to empty a load of rubble from a barge into the water. Sirens from the surrounding ships then greeted the now emptied barge. A second barge of rubble was emptied as well with air tolak bala and air doa selamat being poured into the Straits. A gun salute of five rounds fired from Bukit Timbalan marked the end of the ceremony.

British Malaya was impacted by the Depression of 1920–21 as she was a primary source for many commodities internationally. The constructions process was thus under intense public scrutiny and criticism. Additionally, the British Admiralty would like to have the locks be widened and deepened to accommodate British warships. However, it was found to be difficult to engineer and was very costly. The FMS and Straits Settlements government thus had considered dropping the project.

In January 1923, the lock was open for local sea craft. On 1 October, the partially completed Causeway was officially opened to passenger traffic. The Causeway was officially completed in 1924 when the finishing touches to the lock was done. With an estimated cost 17 million Straits dollars (£277 million in 2000), over 2,300 staff and labourers were employed to during the course of the construction. An opening ceremony was conducted in Johore on 28 June 1924. The Johore Sultan and Governor Guillemard graced the ceremony which a ribbon cutting ceremony was held. A special holiday was declared in Johore for more of the public to take part in the festivities. The opening marked a new era which uninterrupted communications between Singapore and Bangkok now exists. The administration of the Causeway was formalised in 1925 with the formation of the Johore Causeway Control Committee. Under FMSR, the committee was given full autonomy to oversee the efficient management and maintenance of the Causeway.

=== World War II and post-war period ===
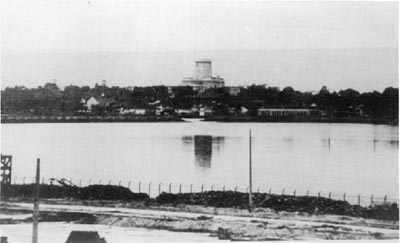
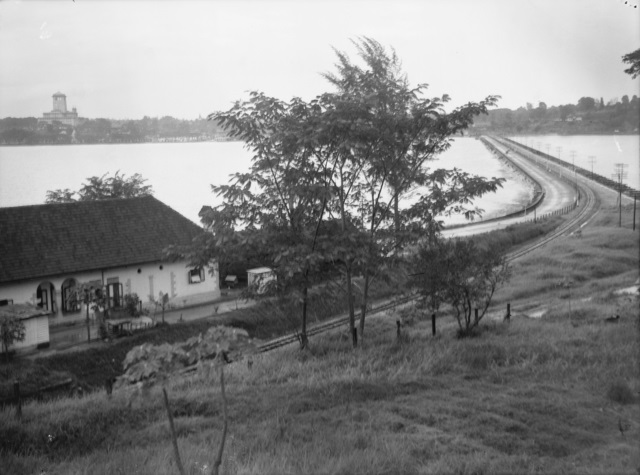
Left: The severed causeway on the eve of Japanese invasion in 1942. Right: The causeway just after the Japanese surrender in 1945.

As the Japanese invasion of Malaya drew to a close, the Allied forces under the command of Lieutenant-General Arthur Percival began retreating from their positions in Johore, crossing the Causeway in the early hours of 31 January 1942. The last unit to cross over was the 2nd Battalion of the Argyll and Sutherland Highlanders who were bagpiped across by two bagpipers Piper James McLean and Piper Charles Stewart to the tunes Hundred Pipers and Highland Laddie. The Causeway was then blown up with two explosions by Royal Engineers. The first wrecked the lock's lift-bridge, while the second caused a 70-foot-wide (21 m) gap in the Causeway and severed the water-carrying pipelines as well. Although this action forced the Japanese to cross the Straits elsewhere, they soon took the city and constructed a girder bridge over the gap.

The bridge remained in its war-torn state until the return of the British after the surrender of the Imperial Japanese forces. The girder bridge, now rotting, was replaced with two Bailey bridge extensions in February 1946, with the rubble of the demolished lift bridge cleared and the railway tracks re-laid. Reconstruction plans of lock channel and lift bridge were looked at in the late 1940s, but were subsequently shelved since demand for water passage through the Causeway wasn't substantial enough to justify the reconstruction costs.

During the Malayan Emergency of 1948 to 1960, as a strategic conduit between Singapore and Malaya, travellers were subjected to stringent security measures to impede the movement of enemy combatants and weapons between Singapore and Malaya. The checks, together with attacks on railway lines further aggravated the traffic congestion on the Causeway. Additionally, the Causeway would be further congested during public holidays and festive seasons.

=== Independence and border control ===
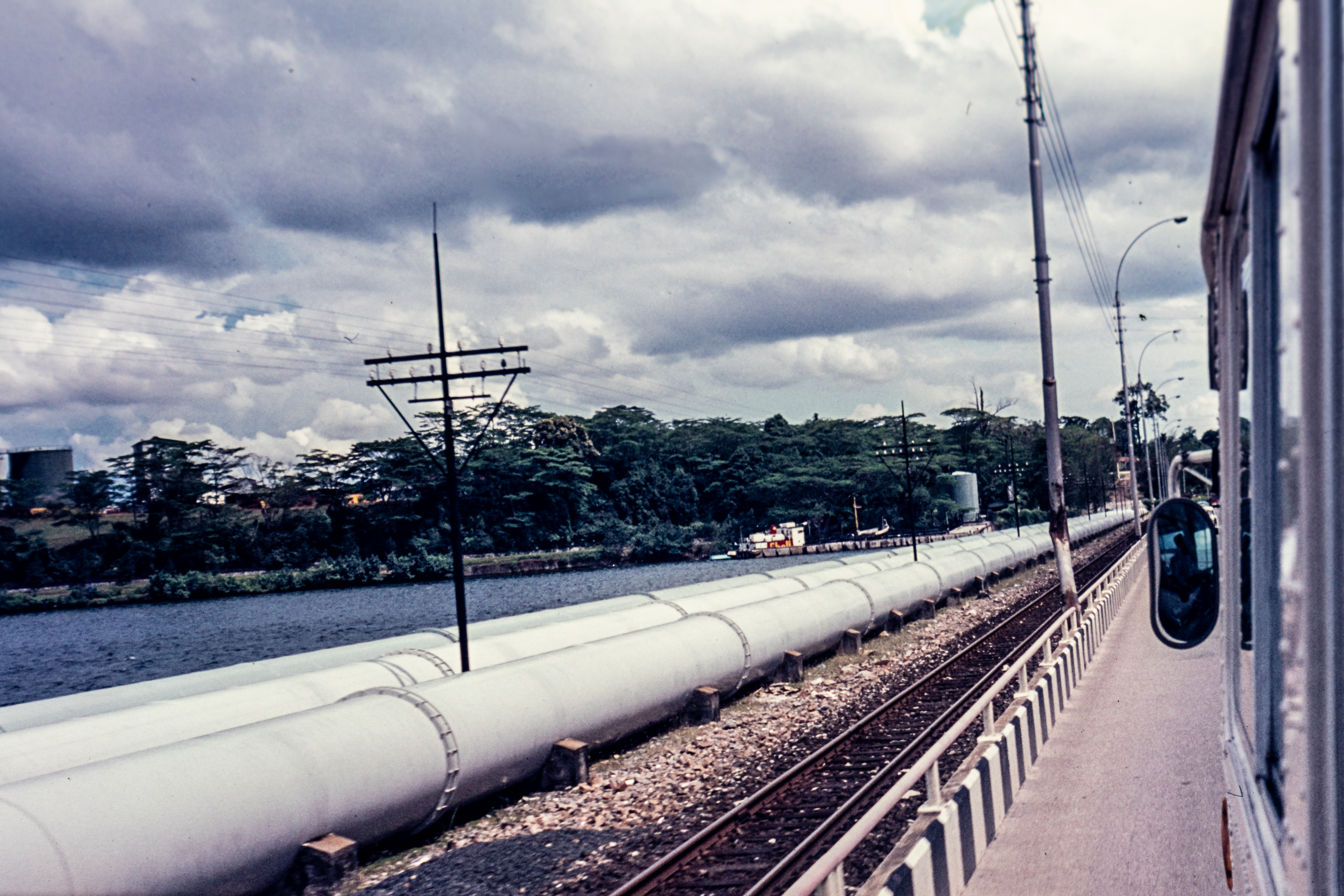
Travelling on the Causeway in a bus in 1973.

The Causeway first became an international border when the Federation of Malaya achieved independence on 31 August 1957. Plans were made to introduce immigration controls at the Causeway, however, a system of strict identity card checks was implemented instead. The Causeway became an internal state border when the Federation of Malaya, Singapore, Sabah and Sarawak merged to form Malaysia on 16 September 1963.

On 22 July 1964, as part of a curfew after racial riots in Singapore, the Causeway was closed to travellers without police permission. It was reopened during non-curfew hours the following day and normal traffic had resumed by 26 July.

After Singapore's separation from Malaysia on 9 August 1965, the Causeway became the border connector between the two countries. Immigration checkpoints were built on both sides, with passport controls implemented on the Singaporean side from June 1967 and on the Malaysian side from September.

Toll collection at the Causeway checkpoint began on 1 November 1984, with ten lanes in total. The toll booths were built by the Malaysian Highway Authority. By December, over S$384,000 worth of toll money were collected. The toll collection reduced traffic congestions in the Causeway. Toll payments were collected for the Malaysian federal government.

To support the ever-increasing trade and foot traffic on the Causeway, both the Malaysian and Singapore governments carried out works to widen the Causeway multiple times as well as to improve checkpoint facilities. Singapore replaced its checkpoint in 1999, followed by Malaysia in 2008. A second border crossing bridge, the Malaysia–Singapore Second Link between Tanjung Kupang and Tuas, was completed in 1998.

In response to the COVID-19 pandemic, Malaysia instituted a nationwide movement control order on 18 March 2020 and closed the country's borders, affecting hundreds of thousands of cross-border commuters between Malaysia and Singapore. However, the flow of cargo, goods and food supplies continued. The quota of daily passengers was increased to 3,420 on 14 March 2022. From 1 April 2022, the quota was lifted with no restrictions imposed on the mode of travel across the land connections.

=== Traffic volume ===
An image captured with a live traffic camera operated by the Land Transport Authority, on the morning of March 8, 2025.

The Causeway is regularly described as one of the busiest land crossings in the world. It has been estimated that between 250,000 to 400,000 people use the causeway on a typical day.

In March 2023, it was reported that about 376,000 people crossed Singapore's land checkpoints (including both the Causeway and the Second Link) every day.

Between 16 June and 18 June 2023, during the school holidays period in Singapore, it was reported that an average of 406,000 persons crossed the Causeway each day, with a peak of 430,000 crossings on 16 June 2023.

On 28 March 2024, according to the Immigration and Checkpoints Authority, 510,000 people crossed the Singapore-Malaysia land borders ahead of a 3-day Good Friday weekend. This was reported to be the highest traffic at Singapore's land borders in a single day. There were continuous tailbacks at Woodlands Checkpoint throughout the day, with queues extending beyond the Seletar Expressway.

The Johor Bahru–Singapore Rapid Transit System opening in January 2027, is projected to relieve the Causeway's traveler numbers by 35%.

=== QR Code system ===
==== Singapore Checkpoint ====
In a bid to ease congestion and reduce waiting time, a QR code system was implemented on 19 March 2024. Travellers in cars passing through Singapore's Woodlands and Tuas checkpoints can clear immigration using QR codes – instead of their passports. The overall waiting time can be reduced by more than 30 per cent if most car travellers use QR codes for immigration clearance, said the Singapore authorities.

==== Malaysia Checkpoint ====
Immigration Department of Malaysia announced the news on its Facebook page on 26 June 2024. The first phase of testing of 'MyRentas" will only be available to bus passengers and Malaysian at the Sultan Iskandar Building. The testing period will be three months (until 12 September 2024), after which it will be open to other checkpoint users. MySejahtera's MyTripQR code clearance system was officially launched at the Second Link checkpoint between Singapore and Malaysia at the beginning of this month, but is currently only available for motorcycle lanes and bus passengers.

== Border checkpoints ==
=== Southern Integrated Gateway ===
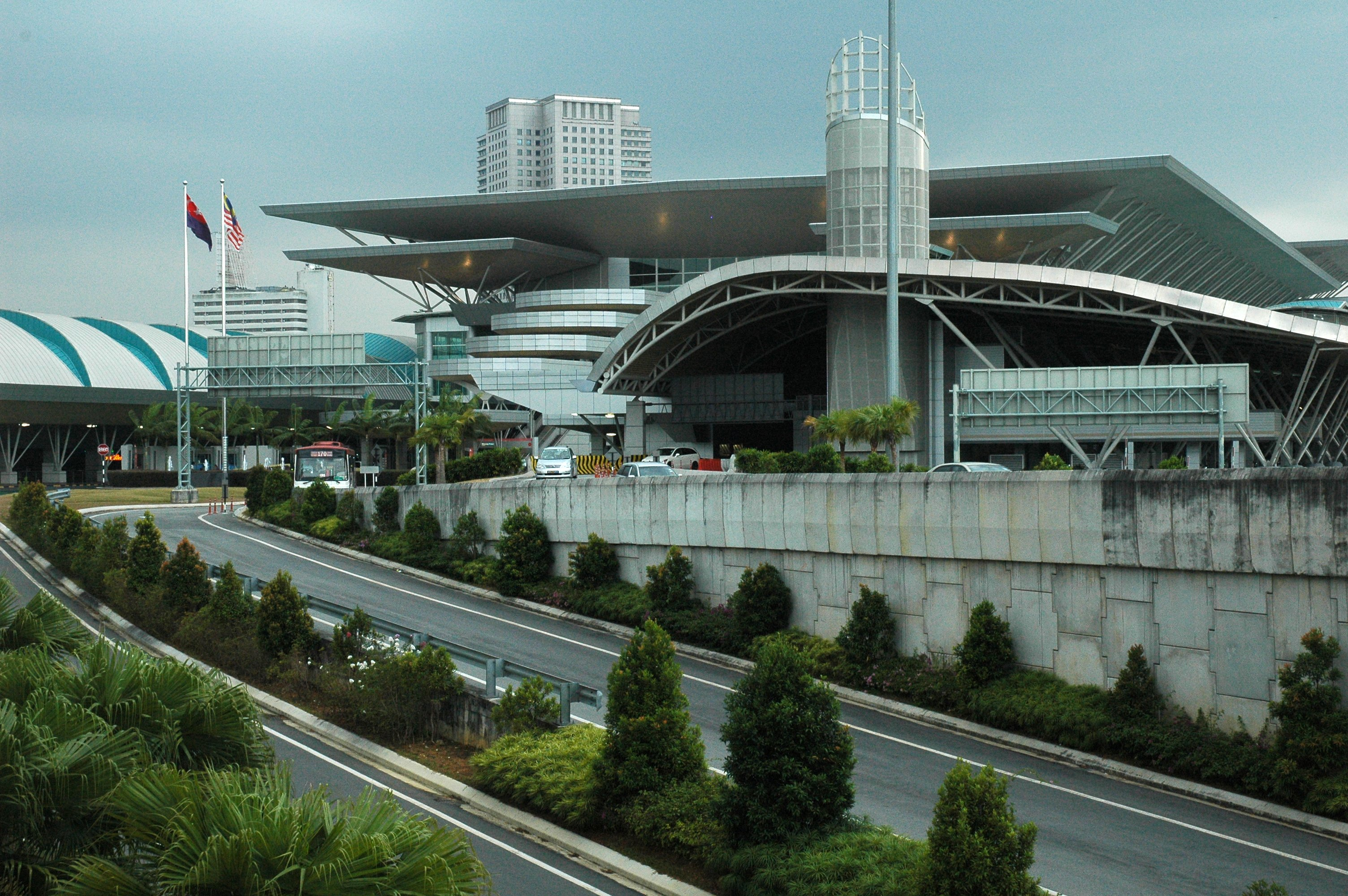
Sultan Iskandar Building, at the northern end of the Causeway in Johor Bahru

The Southern Integrated Gateway consists of the Sultan Iskandar Building and the Johor Bahru Sentral railway station (JB Sentral).

Sultan Iskandar Building is the customs, immigration and quarantine (CIQ) complex handling road traffic and pedestrians. It was officially opened by the Malaysian Prime Minister, Abdullah Badawi on 1 December 2008 and went into full operations on 16 December 2008. The old Tanjung Puteri CIQ complex was subsequently demolished. As the new CIQ complex was located 1 km further inland from the old checkpoint, as well as the lack of a dedicated pedestrian walkway on the new access road, pedestrians are officially no longer allowed to cross the Causeway on foot, though it is tolerated during severe traffic congestion.

JB Sentral railway station is the main railway station of Johor Bahru since 21 October 2010, replacing the old Johor Bahru railway station. JB Sentral also serves as the southbound exit immigration and customs checkpoint for rail passengers heading toward Singapore.

=== Woodlands Checkpoint ===
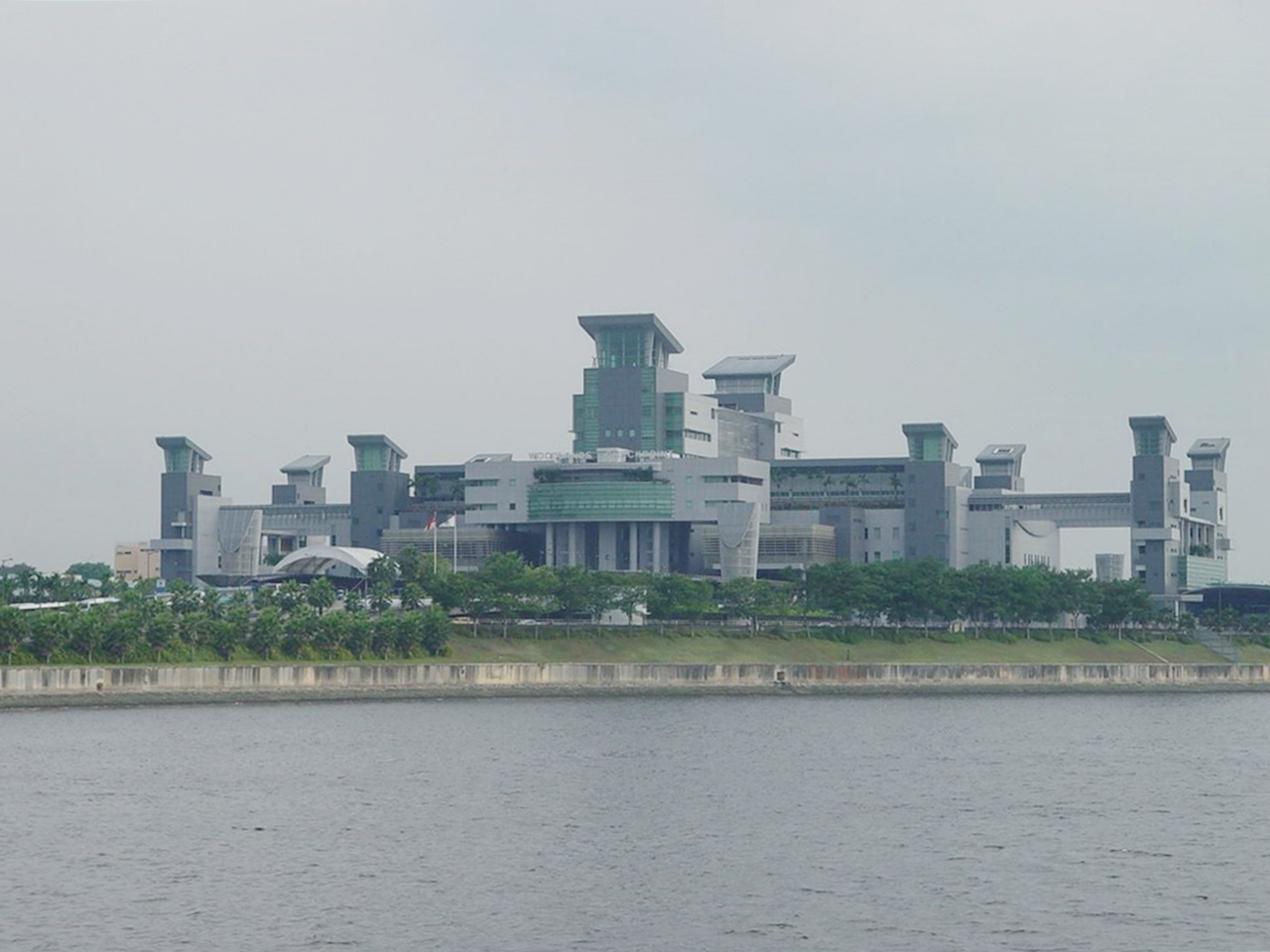
Woodlands Checkpoint, at the southern end of the Causeway, in Singapore.

The new Woodlands Checkpoint, built partially on reclaimed land, was opened in 1999 to accommodate the increasing traffic flow and the soot which had enveloped the old customs complex over the years. The old customs complex, built in the early 1970s, at the junction between Woodlands Road and Woodlands Centre Road closed after the new checkpoint was opened in July 1999, although the motorcycle lane remained opened in the morning until 2001, and it had been reopened on 1 March 2008 for goods vehicles only.

The new checkpoint complex also houses the Woodlands Train Checkpoint, opened on 1 August 1998, as the Singapore railway border clearance facility, which was previously co-located with Malaysian immigration and customs at Tanjong Pagar railway station. The relocation to Woodlands caused disputes between the two countries, which was resolved in 2010. On 1 July 2011, Woodlands Train Checkpoint replaced Tanjong Pagar railway station as Singapore's inter-city railway station. Northbound rail passengers pass through co-located border clearance for both countries at Woodlands Train Checkpoint before boarding the train to Malaysia. Southbound rail passengers clear Malaysian exit controls at JB Sentral, and Singapore immigration and customs on arrival at Woodlands Train Checkpoint.

== Tolls ==
Vehicles have to pay toll charges at both sides of the causeway. The toll plaza at the Malaysian side is operated by the PLUS Expressways Berhad. In Singapore, the Vehicle Entry Permit (VEP) charges apply to cars and motorcycles that have utilised the 10-VEP free days.

== Environmental impact ==
With the construction of the causeway, the water flow across the Straits of Johor has been interrupted, especially after the permanent closure of the lock channel post World War II. While there are ten culverts in the original blueprint of the causeway, connecting the water bodies on both sides of the causeway, four were damaged in British attempt to delay Japanese Army's advance into Singapore and were not repaired upon the return of the British colonial authorities due to costs; four were damaged during the 1975 widening project; and one was subsequently damaged in another development project. This has caused a gradual buildup of pollutants in the straits. In 2006, it was reported in Malaysian news that the straits were a health hazard due to the causeway blocking the flow of water, to which Singaporean authorities disputed the claim stating that the study quoted in the news report found that the sources of pollution were from Sungai Johor and Pasir Gudang.

Algae blooms had been observed in the western side of the straits yearly between 2013 and 2015. A study found that nutrient rich water in the Singapore Strait, mainly waste discharge from passing ships, would enter the dead-ended western side of the Johor Straits and stayed long enough for algae to bloom. The marine life growth in the straits had been impacted, with a knock-on impact on local fishery with Orang Seletar, an indigenous ethnic group who may one day not be able to fish for a living.

== Causeway replacement proposals ==
As far back as 1966, there were several calls by the Malaysians to remove the Causeway. In 1966, in the Johor state legislative council, the speaker said that the Causeway was "more a hindrance than anything else" while a port should be built close to Johor Bahru to rejuvenate the city's economy. The state of Johor currently already has developed ports including Pasir Gudang and Tanjong Pelepas.

The second demand came in year 1986 when Israeli President Chaim Herzog visited Singapore. At that time, the Singapore Government was criticised by Malaysian politicians and the press for allowing his visit.

Under the Mahathir Mohamad administration, the Malaysian government scheduled to build a new customs, immigration and quarantine complex on a hilltop near the Johor Bahru railway station. A bridge was planned to link the new customs complex with the city square. The project was named Southern Integrated Gateway (Gerbang Selatan Bersepadu) by the government. The project was awarded to a construction company, Gerbang Perdana. During the construction, one of the two underpass channels located at the end of the old customs complex had been blocked. Roads exiting from the old customs complex have been diverted. The design envisages a re-direction of traffic flow to the new customs complex after the completion of the proposed new bridge to Singapore. The old customs complex will be torn down once the new customs complex begins operation. All this while, no agreement had been reached with the Singapore Government on replacing the causeway with a proposed new bridge.

The proposals on replacing the old causeway with a new bridge has resulted in a political rift between the two countries since the early 2000s. The Malaysian government envisioned that disagreement by Singapore to participate in the project would result in a crooked bridge above Malaysian waters with half the causeway remaining on the Singapore side. However, Singapore has hinted that it might agree to a bridge if its air force is allowed to use part of Johor's airspace. Malaysia refused the offer and negotiation is said to be still ongoing.

In January 2006, Malaysia unilaterally announced that it is going ahead to build the new bridge on the Malaysian side, now referred to as scenic bridge. The construction of the new scenic bridge on Malaysian side officially began on 10 March 2006, when the piling works of this bridge was completed, but on 12 April 2006, construction was halted and scrapped by Mahathir's successor, Abdullah Ahmad Badawi, with growing complications in both negotiation (the conditions set by Singapore were strongly opposed by the people of Malaysia on grounds of national sovereignty) and legal matters with Singapore. Malaysian government had to pay RM 257.4 million in compensation to the parties involved for this abortive attempt.

In 2006, Badawi has said that "in [the] future, there won't be just one or two bridges between Malaysia and Singapore." That same year however, the Sultan of Johor called for the demolition of the link, reasoning that the Causeway is undermining the state economy as it is causing a brain drain.

== See also ==
- AH2
- Malaysia–Singapore border
- List of international bridges
