= Plentong =

Coordinates: 1°32′N 103°49′E

- Mukim
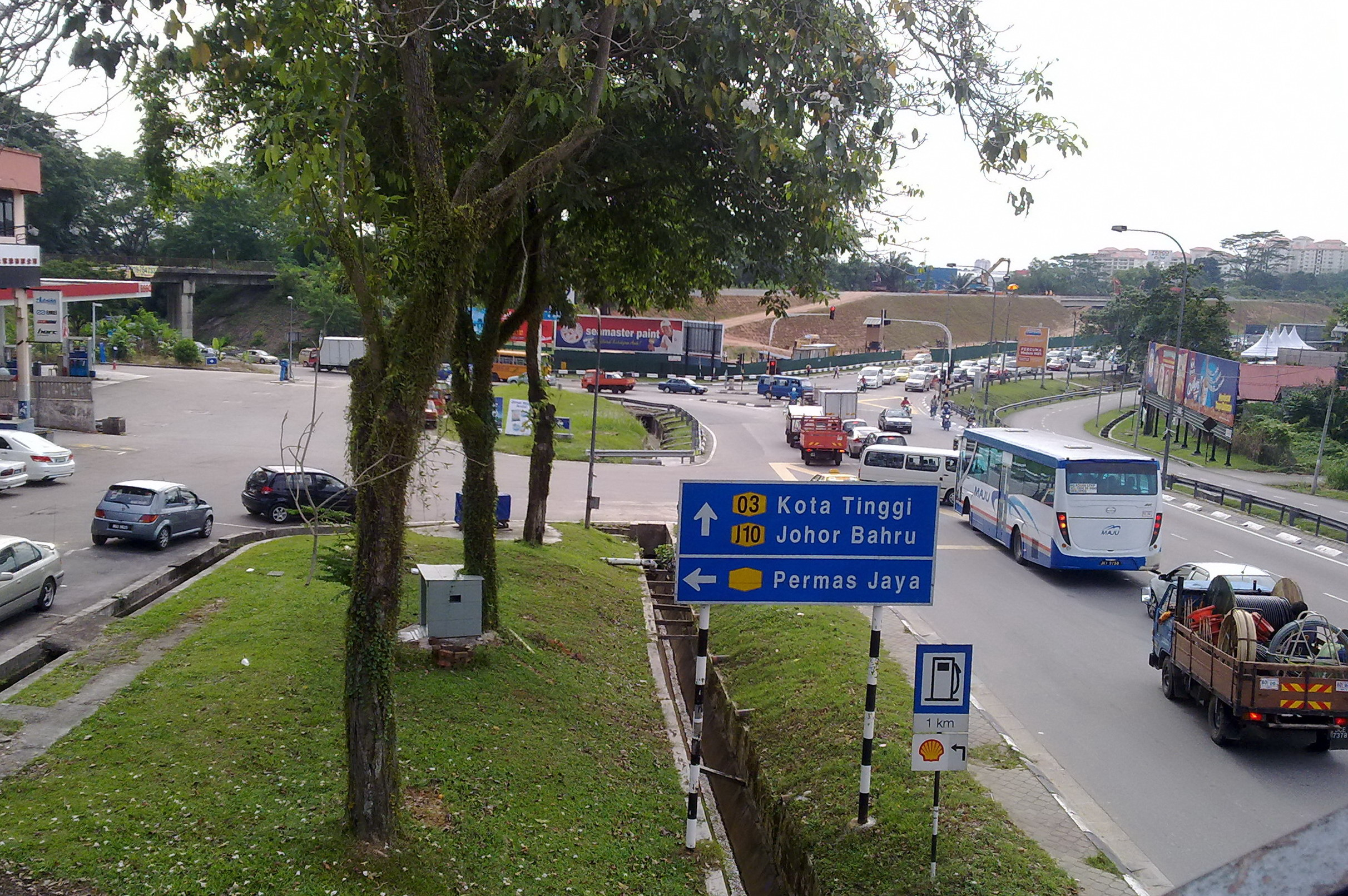

- Plentong in Johor Bahru District
- Country: Malaysia
- State: Johor
- District: Johor Bahru
- City: Johor Bahru

Area
  - Total: 270 km^{2} (100 sq mi)

Population
  - Total: 448,160
  - Density: 1,700/km^{2} (4,300/sq mi)

Plentong is a mukim in Johor Bahru District, Johor, Malaysia.

== History ==
It began as a Kangchu settlement known as Tey Chu Kang in 1859 and then an old Chinese new village that is now a busy town in Johor.

== Geography ==
Mukim Plentong which covers Permas Jaya, Pasir Gudang etc. is the most populous mukim in Johor and one of the most populous in Malaysia with over 500,000 residents. It covers an area of 202 km^{2}.

Plentong village suffered extensive flooding due to a poor water drainage system. The government cooperated with KTM Berhad (Malaysian Train Service Company) to rebuild the KTM Plentong Bridge in order to facilitate the flow of Sungai Plentong during rainy season. The whole project cost about 50 million and as of July 2009, the train bridge is in the early stage of construction.

== Tourist attractions ==
Plentong is the headquarters of the Malacca-Johor archdiocese, known as Majodi centre and also has a Catholic Saint Joseph Church. There are several prominent Chinese temples like Ban Fook Temple (避兰东萬福廟), Qian Shou Guan Yin Temple (避兰东千手观音庙), Hien Tian Meow Old Temple (马西玄天上帝古廟), Other places of worship include several mosques and Hindu temples. One of the largest granite quarries in Johor is located nearby. It also houses the Permas Jaya Bridge.

== Transportation ==
The area is accessible by Muafakat Bus route P-301.
