= Tebrau =

- Town
- Interactive map of Tebrau
- Coordinates: 1°32′N 103°45′E
- Country: Malaysia
- State: Johor
- District: Johor Bahru
- City: Johor Bahru
- Time zone: UTC+8 (MYT)
- Postal code: 71500

Tebrau or Teberau is a mukim and a town in Johor Bahru District, Johor, Malaysia. It is the third largest mukim in the district.

== Administrative area ==
- Alexandere Avenue
- Bandar Dato' Onn
- Adda Heights
- Nasa City
- Setia Tropika
- Desa Mutiara
- Yellow Horizon
- Kawasan Kempas Denai
- Taman Delima
- Taman Daya
- Taman Setia Indah
- Taman Mount Austin
- Taman Desa Tebrau
- Taman Desa Jaya
- Taman Desa Cemerlang
- Taman Ehsan Jaya
- Taman Istimewa
- Taman Bukit Mutiara
- Taman Puteri Wangsa
- Taman Bestari Indah
- Taman Desa Mutiara
- Taman Impian Skudai
- Taman Impian Emas
- Taman Eko Perniagaan
- Taman Kempas Baru
- Taman Impian Jaya
- Taman Seri Austin
- Taman Ekoflora
- Ulu Tiram

== Villages ==
- Kampung Kangkar Tebrau
- Kampung Pandan, Johor Bahru
- Ulu Tiram
- Kampung Seelong Jaya
- Kampung Maju Jaya
- Taman Perindustrian Gembira
- Taman Gembira
- Taman Johor
- Taman Bukit Mewah
- Taman Munsyi Ibrahim
- Taman Anggerik
- Taman Cempaka
- Kampung Pemuda Jaya
- Khaya Village
- Felda Ulu Tiram
- Taman Perindustrian Indec
- Kempas Baru
- Kempas Permatang
- Kempas Denai
- Tampoi

== Transportation ==
The mukim is accessible by Causeway Link route 6B from Johor Bahru Sentral railway station.
