= Pasir Gudang Energy =

Malaysian gas turbine power station

Sultan Iskandar Power Station
- Official name: Pasir Gudang Energy
- Country: Malaysia
- Location: Pasir Gudang, Johor
- Coordinates: 1°26′56″N 103°52′54″E
- Status: Operational
- Commission date: 1981
- Decommission date: August 2022
- Owner: Tenaga Nasional
- Operators: National Electricity Board (NEB) (Lembaga Letrik Negara (LLN)) (1981-1990); Tenaga Nasional Berhad (TNB) (1990-present)

Thermal power station
- Primary fuel: Gas
- Secondary fuel: Oil

Power generation
- Nameplate capacity: 275 MW

Sultan Iskandar Power Station (Malay: Stesen Janaelektrik Sultan Iskandar) is a Malaysian gas turbine power station located in Pasir Gudang, Johor.

== History ==
Construction of the plant began in 1977 and completed in 1980. The station was officially opened in September 1981 by H.R.H. Sultan Iskandar of Johor.

== See also ==
- List of power stations in Malaysia
