= Pelentong River, Johor =

River of Johor, Malaysia

Coordinates: 1°30′N 103°48′E

The Pelentong River (Malay: Sungai Pelentong; Sungei Plintong and Sungei Plentong) is a river in Johor Bahru District, Johor, Malaysia.

== See also ==
- List of rivers of Malaysia
