= Bandar Dato' Onn =

- Suburb
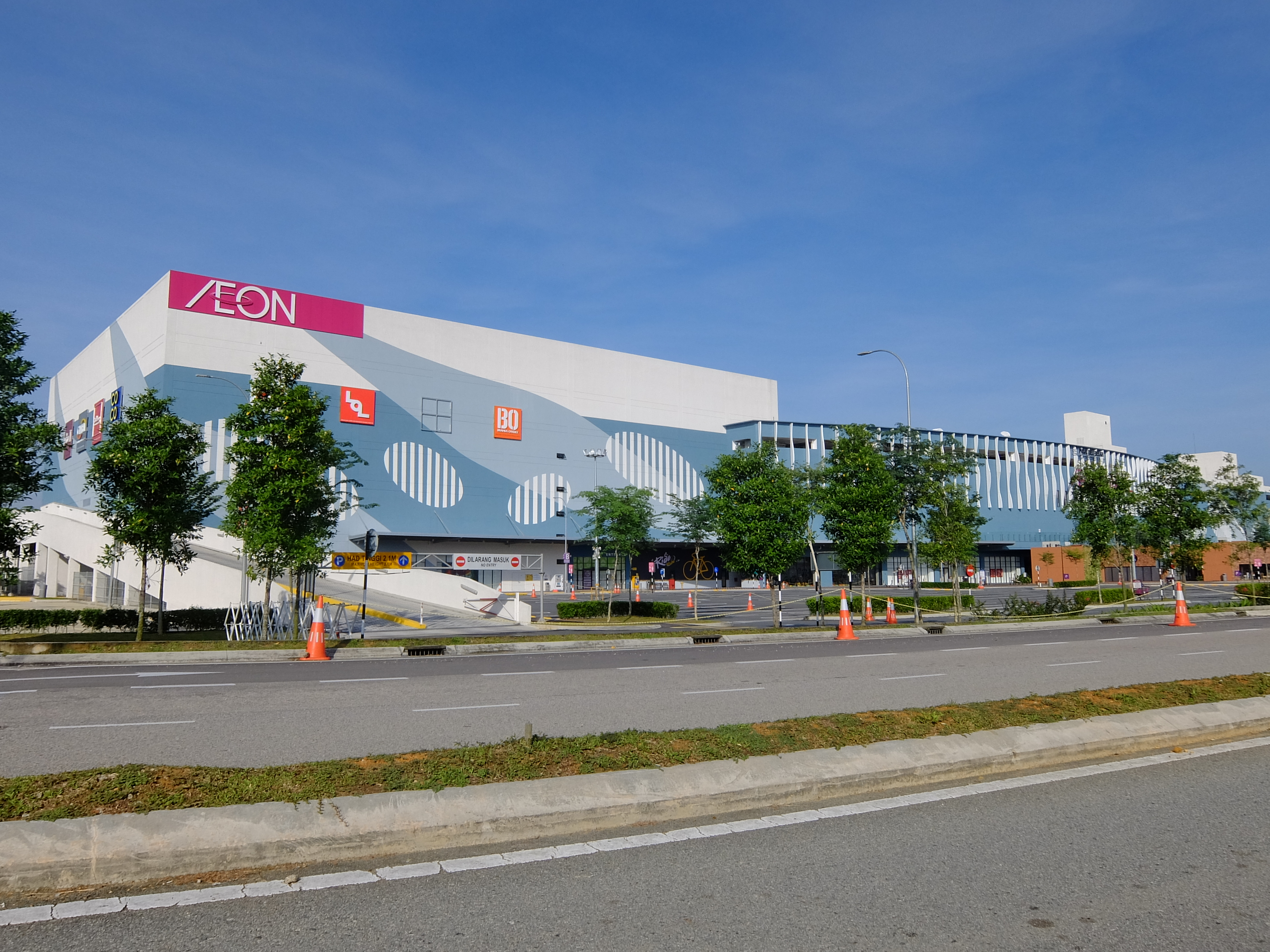
- AEON Bandar Dato' Onn
- Interactive map of Bandar Dato' Onn
- Location in Malaysia
- Country: Malaysia
- State: Johor
- District: Johor Bahru
- City: Johor Bahru
- Named after: Dato' Onn bin Jaafar

Population
  - Total: 90,000 (when fully completed)

Bandar Dato' Onn is a suburb in Johor Bahru, Johor, Malaysia.

== Name ==
The suburb is named after the late Dato' Onn bin Jaafar.

== History ==
Bandar Dato' Onn was developed by Johor Land Berhad. It was officially launched by Education Minister Datuk Seri Hishammudin Tun Hussein, the grandson of Dato' Onn.

== Architecture ==
When fully completed, the suburb will house 90,000 residents spread across 19 neighborhoods.

== Transportation ==
Dato' Onn Interchange was officially launched by Johor Crown Prince Tunku Ismail Idris.
