= Sultan Iskandar Building =

Coordinates: 1.4651149°N 103.7659555°E

Sultan Iskandar Building Bangunan Sultan Iskandar
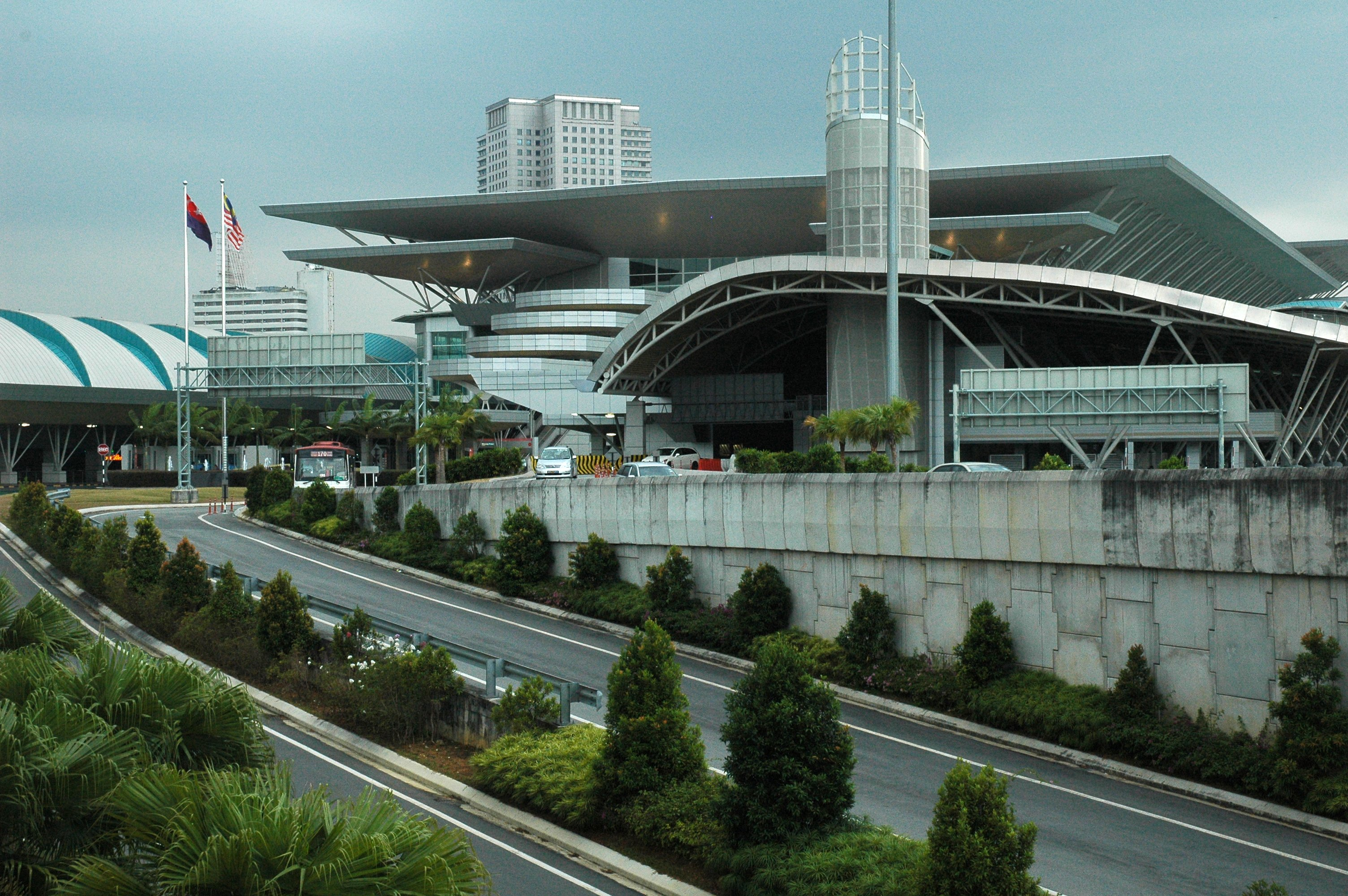

General information
- Type: Customs, Immigration and Quarantine (CIQ) Complex
- Location: Bukit Chagar, Johor Bahru, Johor, Malaysia
- Owner: Primary operators Government of Malaysia; Malaysian Public Works Department (JKR) Secondary operators Department of Immigration Malaysia; Royal Customs Department Malaysia; Malaysian Road Transport Department; PLUS Malaysia Berhad (Projek Lebuhraya Usahasama Berhad); Royal Malaysian Police; Veterinary Service Department; Ministry of Home Security Affairs; Malaysian Timber Industrial Board; Malaysian Fisheries Development Authority; Federal Agricultural Marketing Authority; Johor's State Land and Mines Office; Perhilitan; Johor's State Agriculture Department; Johor's State Health Department; Majlis Bandaraya Johor Bahru (MBJB); Tourism Malaysia

Design and construction
- Developer: Government of Malaysia; Malaysian Public Works Department (JKR); Gerbang Perdana Sdn Bhd

The Sultan Iskandar Building (BSI; Malay: Bangunan Sultan Iskandar) is a customs, immigration and quarantine (CIQ) complex in Johor Bahru, Johor, Malaysia. Located at the northern end of the Johor–Singapore Causeway, it is one of two land ports of entry to Malaysia on the Malaysia–Singapore border.

The building was named after the late Sultan Iskandar of Johor. Built as part of the Southern Integrated Gateway project on the former site of the Lumba Kuda flats, Kampung Bukit Chagar, the building occupies an area of 232,237 square metres (2,499,780 sq ft). The building started operations in 2008, replacing the former Johor Bahru Checkpoint.

From Malaysia, the main expressway leading to the building is the Johor Bahru Eastern Dispersal Link Expressway. After border inspection, vehicles (and pedestrians) continue onto the Causeway, eventually reaching the Woodlands Checkpoint in Singapore. Pedestrian access to the building is provided via the Johor Bahru Sentral railway station, which is linked to the building by a footbridge.

== History ==
=== Background ===
Originally even after Johor and Singapore were designated as separate British protectorates, and the Johor–Singapore Causeway was built to accommodate land access between both states, no border control was established between them. However, checks would be done periodically due to extraordinary circumstances, such as the Malayan Emergency, but otherwise the citizens of both sides were free to roam between the regions without many conditions. This also extended to the point when Malaya, including Johor, achieved independence in 1957 while Singapore was still a Crown Colony, and also when Singapore and Malaya formed the Federation of Malaysia later on. However the necessities for a proper border control arose when Singapore separated from Malaysia and became its own sovereign country in 1965.

=== Establishment of border control ===
When the border control was first established between both Malaysia and Singapore, the only necessary document was mainly only identity cards issued by both governments to pass through and both countries still retained joined visa issuance to visitors. However, as authorities on both sides are still concerned of each other affairs, the joint visa was later discontinued, and tighter control was later introduced using either international passport or special limited passport for Johor-Singapore crossing as of 1967. This also triggers the need of establishment of a proper border checkpoint building on both sides, where Malaysia established their own custom and immigration complex in Johor Bahru for this purpose.

=== Old Immigration and Custom complex ===
The old Custom, Immigration and Quarantine (CIQ) complex was later established right on the Johor end of the Causeway, just before the Johor Bahru town centre. Originally it is just a simple two-storey building with lanes for pedestrian, buses, cars and lorries, which were rather limited considering the traffic back then.

In the 1980s, the CIQ was later rebuilt and the lanes were expanded not only to accommodate increasing traffic between both sides by introducing more lanes and facilities for motorists and pedestrian, but also to accommodate upgrades of the main route to the Causeway, Jalan Tun Abdul Razak, which later became part of Skudai Highway. While the original plan to make Skudai Highway part of North-South Expressway was scrapped due to Johor Bahru's town developments restricting the road upgrades, a toll plaza was introduced on the CIQ complex and started charging motorists that passed through the Causeway, in or out.

Improvements and additions were introduced further as number of crossers grow, however pressing need for a better immigration complex to match with Singapore's Woodlands Checkpoint and checkpoints in Second Link Expressway give birth to a new integrated gateway complex proposal later on.

Johor Bahru Immigration and Custom complex in its initial days in the 1960s.

Johor Bahru original CIQ with new extension for clearance lanes, 1970s.

Johor Bahru CIQ after major renovation, 1987.

=== Southern Integrated Gateway and new complex ===
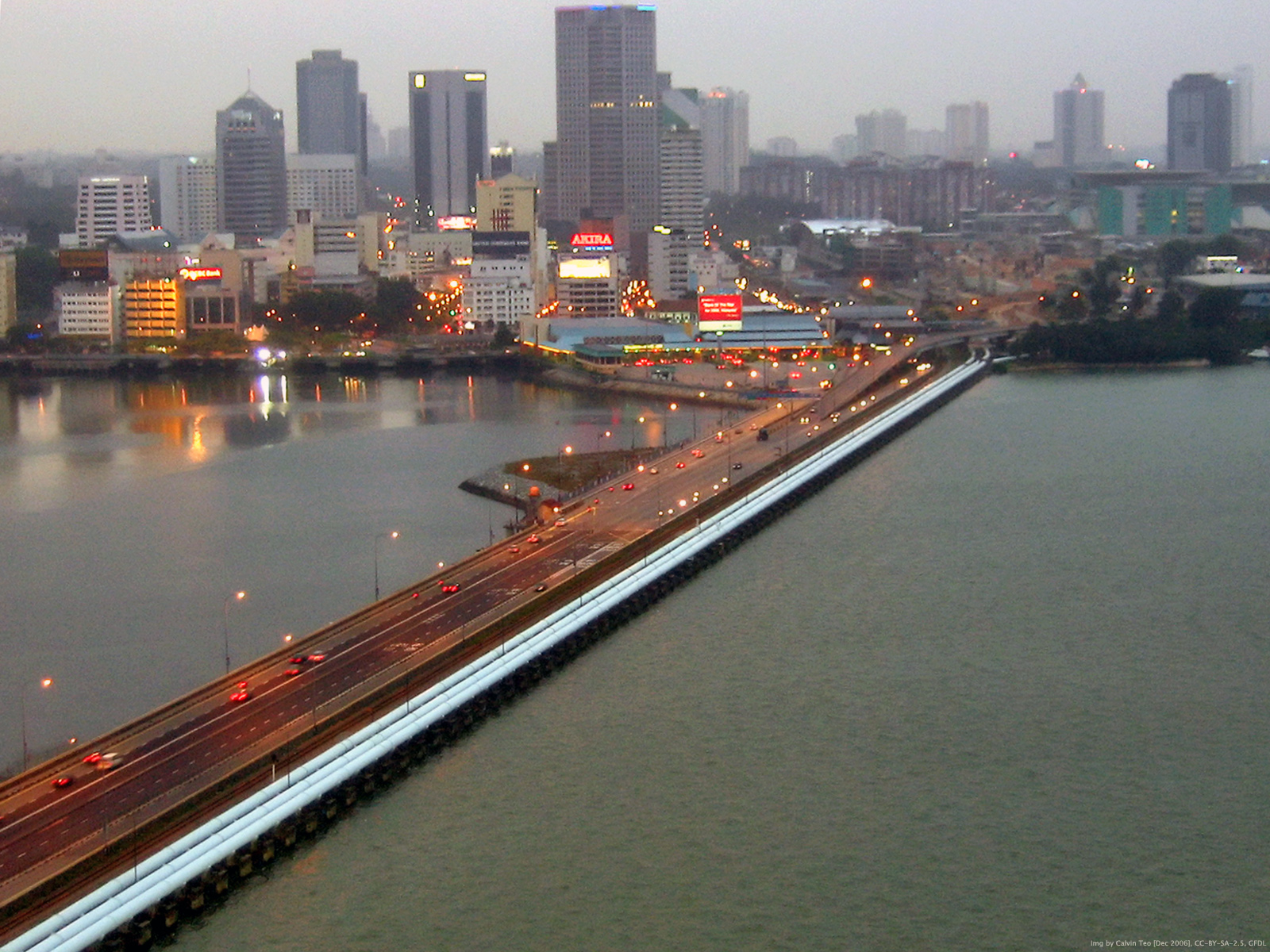
Johor–Singapore Causeway in 2006, with the old Johor Bahru CIQ still in operation and the Southern Integrated Gateway under construction.

In 2002, accommodating to growing need for a better, smoother border crossing condition, the Southern Integrated Gateway was proposed, combining a new CIQ complex, new bus and train stations as well as new bridge to replace the Malaysian side of the Causeway. The plan is to move the CIQ to Bukit Chagar, where later it would be connected to Tanjung Puteri bridge (the new Causeway replacement bridge) as well as flyovers from a new highway (Johor Bahru Eastern Dispersal Link Expressway) and other roads nearby elevated. It also will be connected to a new train station, Johor Bahru Sentral station via a footbridge. More clearance lanes were also proposed in this building as well as new and bigger clearance hall for pedestrian and public bus commuters. Both clearance areas are covered.

All plans were later passed by the Federal Government of Malaysia, and preliminary work begin in 2003. However, despite some groundwork already ongoing, the Tanjung Puteri bridge plan was cancelled by the federal government, now under Abdullah Ahmad Badawi as Prime Minister, citing costs and diplomatic issues. However other projects continued as planned with the new CIQ is done and fully operating in December 2008 for all motorists, named Sultan Iskandar CIQ in honour of the Sultan of Johor back then, Sultan Iskandar Al-haj.

However, the plan and its later execution was criticized by motorists especially during the first months, due to bad entry lanes, lack of signs and guides, and also pedestrians due to the location change adding distance to the CIQ, and access route layout on the Causeway side is not pedestrian friendly.

The old Johor Bahru checkpoint was later demolished.

=== 2023 blackout incident ===
On December 6, 2023, Sultan Iskandar Building experience 11 hours of power outage. A scheduled maintenance work on the night of December 5 turned awry when backup generators broke down, causing extended blackout until the morning of December 6. The blackout caused long queues inside the checkpoint and officers on duty had to carry out immigration clearances manually in the dark. The power outage created traffic jam in Singapore side of the Causeway and Immigration and Checkpoints Authority warned travellers of "tailback from Malaysia". Johor Menteri Besar, Onn Hafiz Ghazi, said that the power outage was an embarrassment to Johor.

== Components ==
=== Immigration Checkpoint ===
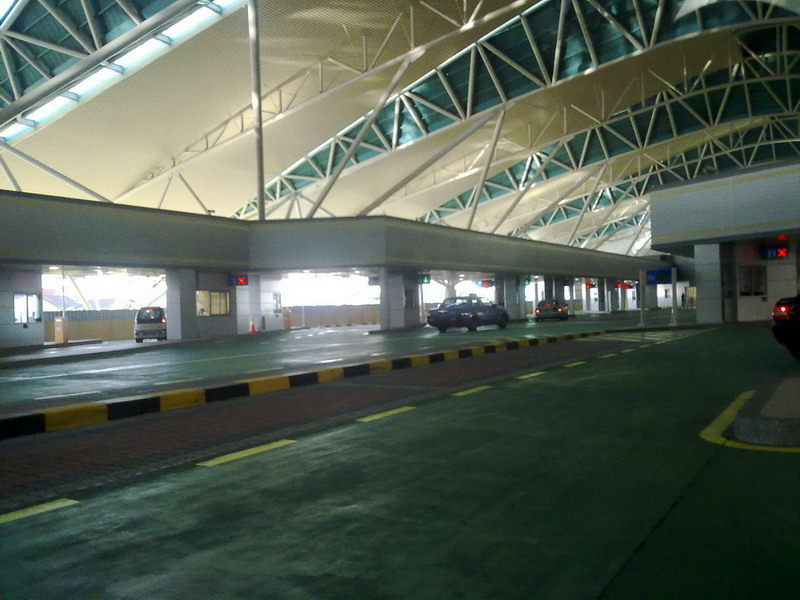
Immigration checkpoint to exit Johor Bahru

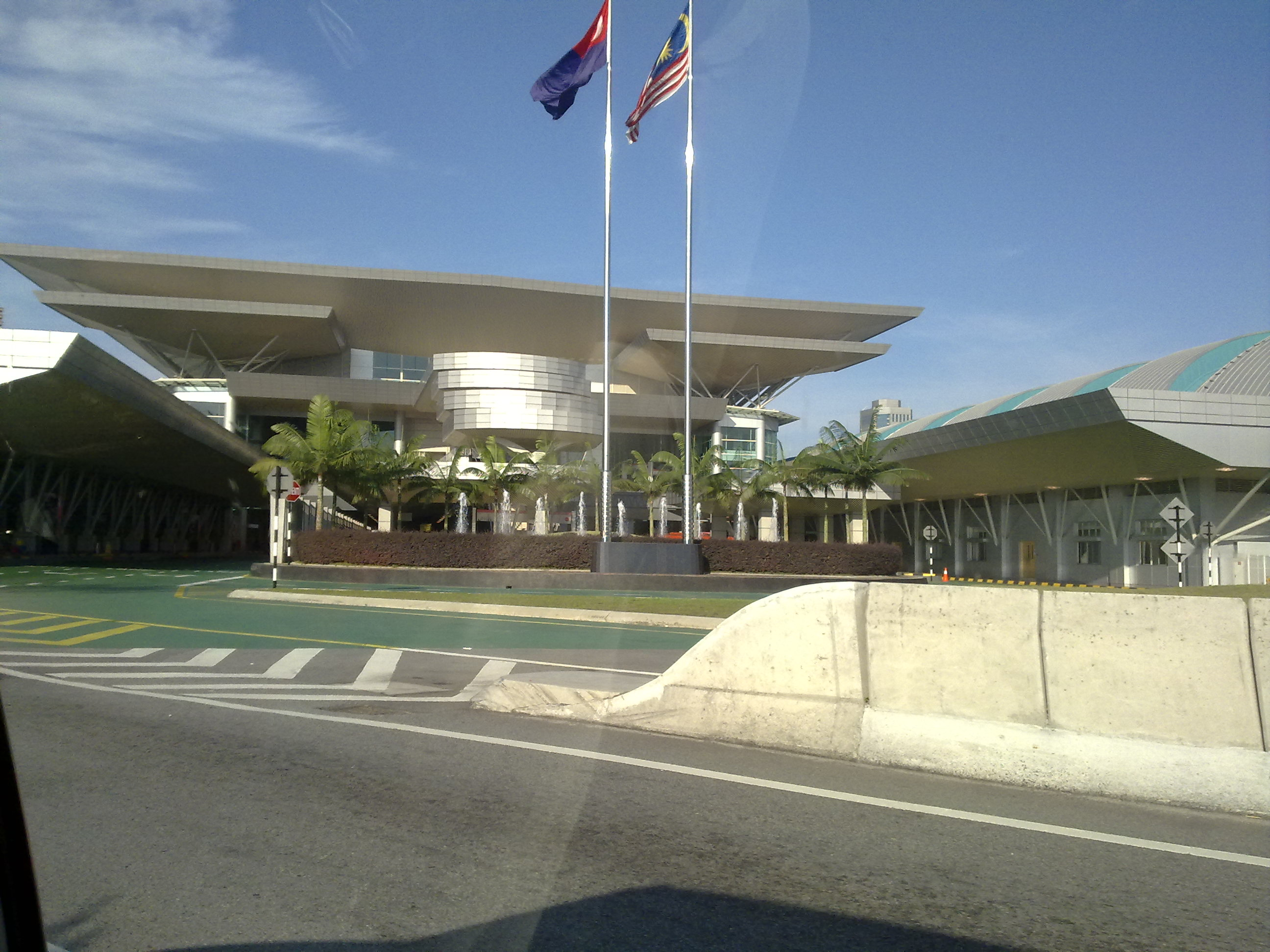
Bangunan Sultan Iskandar, seen from car heading towards Jalan Lingkaran Dalam

The immigration checkpoint has different checkpoints for bus passengers, bus drivers, lorries, motorcycles and cars. The checkpoint was designed with 38 counters for cars entering Malaysia, and 39 counters for those departing from Malaysia. There are 50 counters in each direction for motorcycles entering and departing Malaysia. The Secured Automated Clearance System for Malaysian Citizen Motorcyclists (M-BIKE) are provided here for all Malaysian citizen motorcyclists only, while foreigners can use Manual Counters for Motorcyclists.

=== Customs Checkpoint ===
At the customs checkpoint, 36 counters are designated for cars (20 for those arriving in Malaysia and 16 for those leaving the country) and 25 for motorcycles (17 for arrivals and 8 for departures).

== Tolls ==
All toll transactions at the CIQ complex are conducted electronically with Touch 'n Go, SmartTAG or MyRFID. All foreign-registered vehicles embarking from the Singapore Woodlands checkpoint can purchase a TnG card at an old building on the left side of the causeway before approaching Johor.

It was the first to implement only electronic toll transactions since 2008, with the last being North-South Expressway and East Coast Expressway.

The new CIQ complex is situated approximately 2 kilometres (1.2 mi) from the previous complex at the Johor Causeway. The complex is equipped with a customer service centre and reload lanes, which operate daily to enable the public to purchase, reload, or check their Touch-N-Go cards' prepaid balance.

== Transportation ==
The cross-border land transportation of the Sultan Iskandar Building towards Singapore, via the Johor–Singapore Causeway, is mainly served by eight cross-border public bus services, as well as four private-owned cross-border express coach services. Singapore government-owned public bus services 160, 170 and 170X are part of Bukit Merah Bus Package, and service 950 is part of the Woodlands Bus Package, both under the Land Transport Authority's Bus Contracting Model. Malaysian mobility company Causeway Link owns and operates the public bus services CW1, CW2 and CW5. Singapore mobility company Advanced Coach Services owns and operates the public service AC7. Private express bus services to Queens Street, as well as Changi Airport and Resorts World Sentosa, are operated by Singapore-Johore Express (SJE) Pte Ltd and Transtar Travel & Tours Pte Ltd.

== See also ==
- Sultan Abu Bakar Complex
