= Tebrau River =

River in Johor, Malaysia

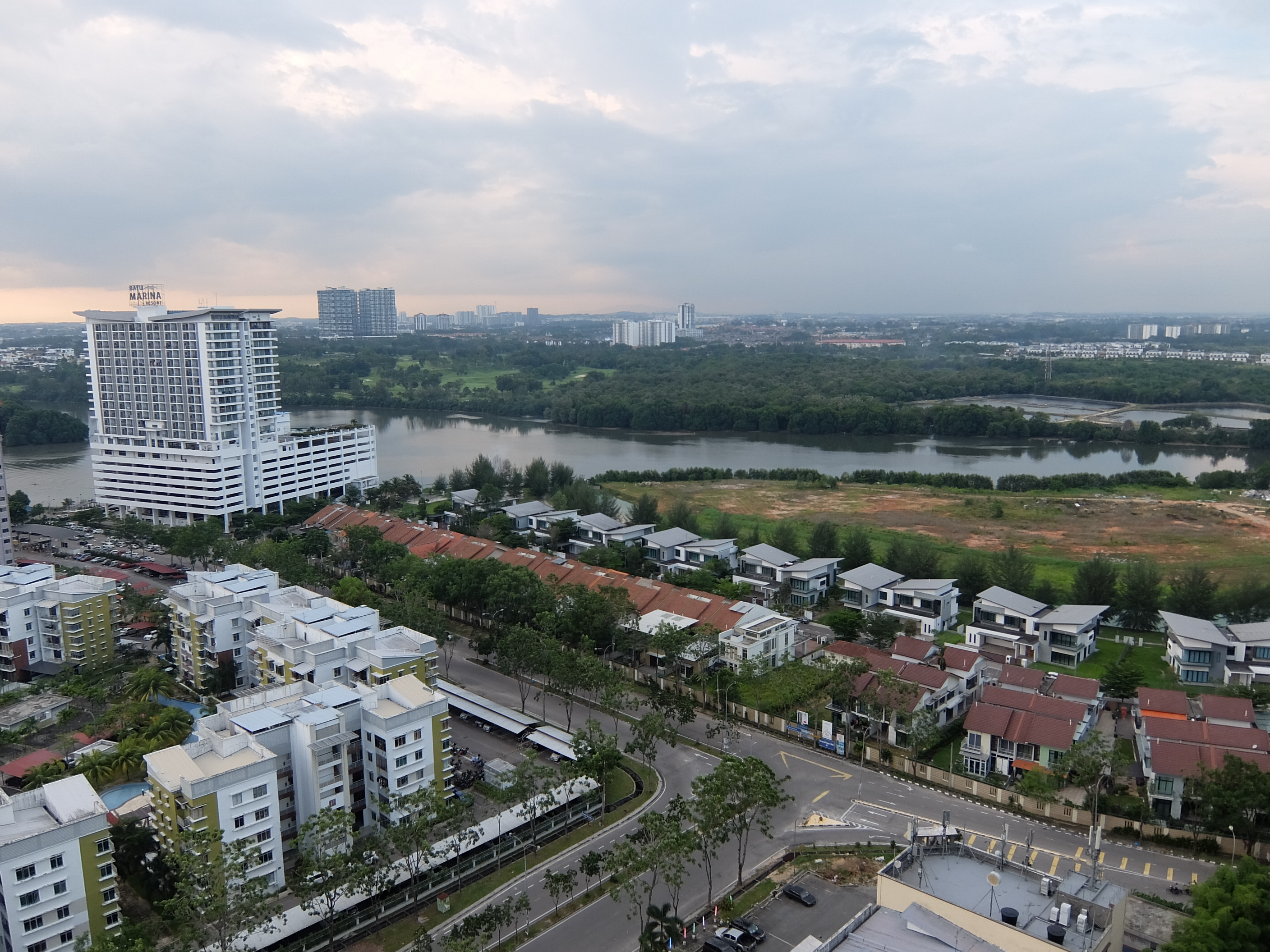
Tebrau River

The Tebrau River (Malay: Sungai Tebrau) is a river in Johor, Malaysia.

== See also ==
- Geography of Malaysia
