= Permas Jaya =

Suburb in Johor Bahru, Johor, Malaysia

- Suburb of Johor Bahru
- Bandar Baru Permas Jaya
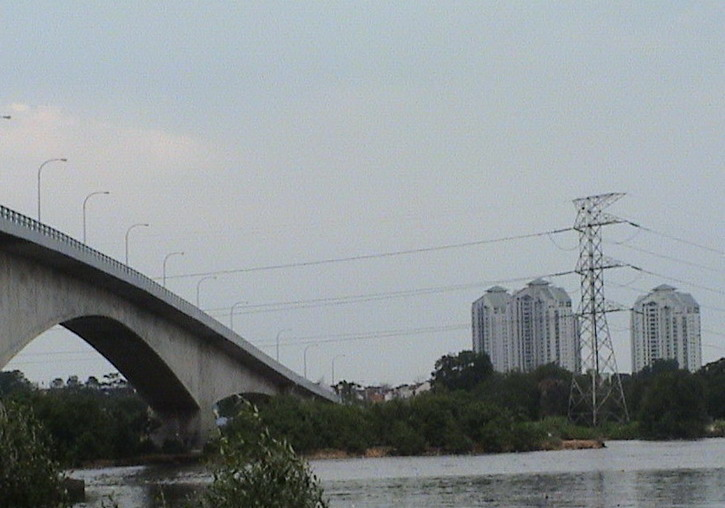
- Permas Jaya Bridge, part of the Johor Bahru East Coast Parkway facing the direction of Permas Jaya across Tebrau River. At the background are blocks of the Straits View Condominium.
- Coordinates: 1°29′54.3″N 103°49′10.0″E
- Country: Malaysia
- State: Johor
- District: Johor Bahru
- City: Johor Bahru
- Time zone: UTC+8 (MST)
  - Summer (DST): Not observed
- Postal code: 81750
- Website: mbjb.gov.my

Permas Jaya (officially named Bandar Baru Permas Jaya), is a suburb in Johor Bahru, Johor, Malaysia. It has about 40,000–45,000 residents. The township is accessible through the Permas Jaya Bridge, the Second Permas Jaya Bridge, and the Eastern Dispersal Link.

The residential areas are divided into sections, with the section numbers numbering from 1 to 15 and beyond, based on the phases when the town was built. The roads in the residential areas are further named with a "/" and another representing number, which means 1/13 is a road found in the residential area 1.

Permas Jaya has a 9-hole golf course and residential condominiums. It also has a sports and recreational complex and a go-kart circuit. Permas Point, also known as Permas Complex, used to be the main shopping and leisure complex with a cinema and bowling alley but has been closed since 1999. It also boost a sports complex which has a tennis court, swimming complex and library. Currently, ÆON is the main shopping centre in Permas Jaya. Permas Jaya Management has built a new Permas Mall to attract new businesses. Permas Jaya is a popular choice for middle class professionals and business people (mainly local Chinese and Singaporeans) as well as a small number of expatriates to live in because of its strategic location between Johor Bahru and Pasir Gudang shipbuilding yards within an area with a population of more than 300,000. There is a bit of a night life and good restaurants, some with live entertainment. There are also many Chinese styled cafes as well as the ÆON Permas Jaya, which is one of the earliest ÆON branches in Johor Bahru. There is a very popular Chinese Tua Pek Kong Temple along Jalan Permas 6/6.

== Geography ==
The suburb spans over an area of 11.6 km^{2}.

== Transportation ==
=== Road ===
The town is accessible by bus from Johor Bahru Sentral (T21, S&S 2).
