= Polunin =

Polunin (masculine), Polunina (feminine) is a Russian-language surname. Notable people with the surname include:

- Alevtina Polunina
- Alexander Polunin (born 1997), Russian ice hockey player
- Alyona Polunina (born 1975), Russian filmmaker
- Andriy Polunin (1971–2025), Ukrainian footballer
- Elizabeth Polunin
- Ivan Polunin (1920–2010), English doctor, photographer, filmmaker
- Maxim Polunin
- Nicholas Polunin (1909–1997), British botanist, explorer and writer
- Oleg Polunin (1914–1985), English botanist
- Sergei Polunin (born 1989), Russian ballet dancer
- Slava Polunin (born 1950), Russian clown
- Vladimir Polunin (1880–1957), Russian painter
- Zoya Polunina (born 1991), Russian ice hockey player
