= Orang Seletar language =

Language

Orang Seletar
- Native to: Malaysia, Singapore
- Ethnicity: Orang Seletar
- Native speakers: 1,200 (2018)
- Language family: Austronesian: Malayo-Polynesian; Malayic; Malay?; Orang Seletar
- Writing system: Unwritten

Language codes
- ISO 639-3: ors
- Glottolog: oran1259
- ELP: Orang Seletar
- Orang Seletar is classified as Critically Endangered by the UNESCO Atlas of the World's Languages in Danger.

Range of the Orang Seletar language, based on Tan (2020) and Andaya (2018)

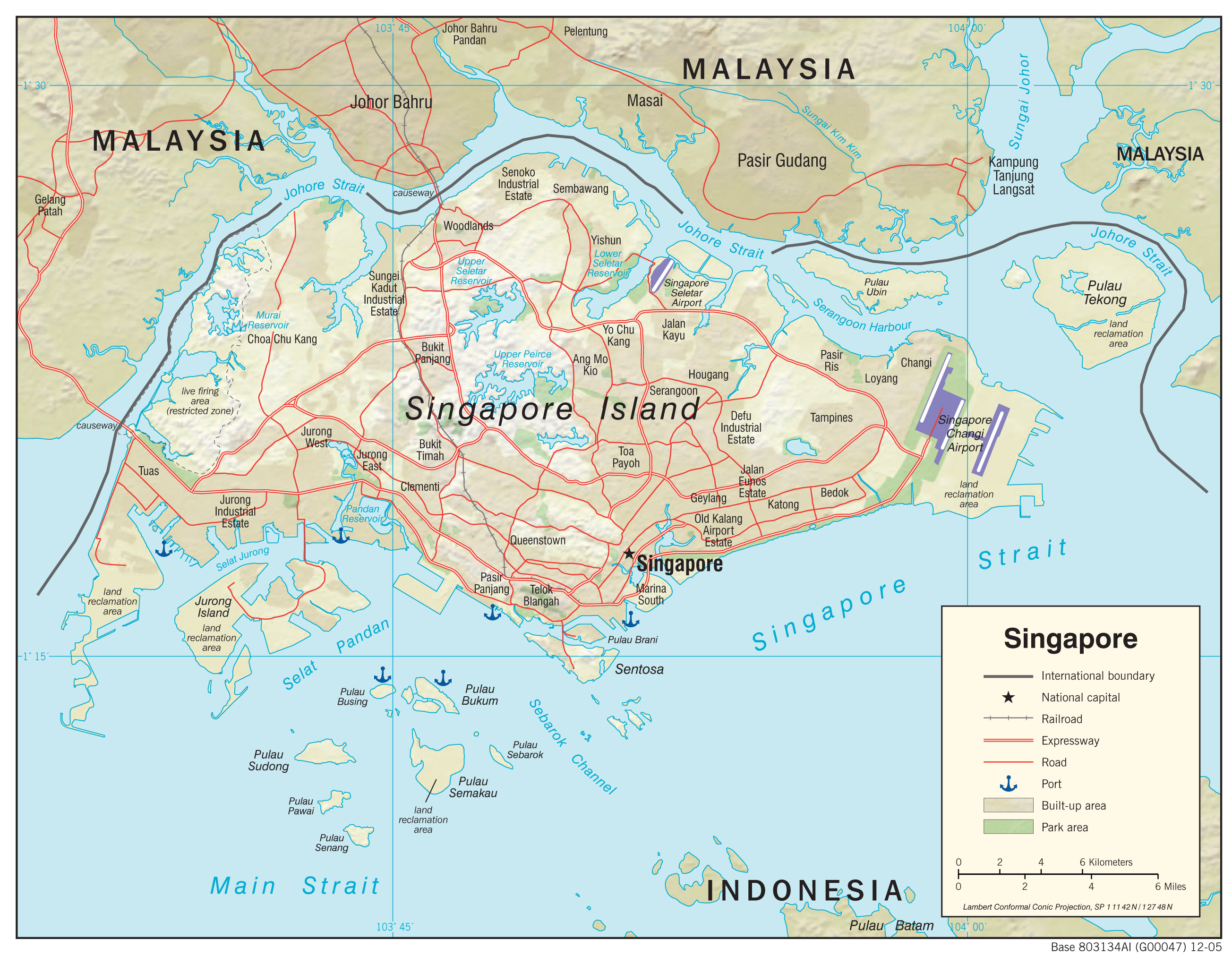
The Orang Seletar live along the Tebrau Strait, located between Malaysia and Singapore

Orang Seletar, also known as Slitar or Seletar, is a language of the Orang Laut of the south coast of the Malay Peninsula. It is very close to Malay, and may be counted as a dialect of that language. The speaking population is unknown, but is likely in the range of a few thousand. The language is considered critically endangered by UNESCO. Currently, older generations communicate with each other exclusively or mainly in Seletar, but younger generations and people living outside the community are more likely to use Malay. Few Seletar people teach their mother tongue to their own children; this, combined with other factors such as diminishing seafood catches has led the younger generations to urbanise and shift languages.

== Name ==
The language of the Orang Seletar is called Bahasa Seletar. It is sometimes referred to as Bahasa Asli "indigenous language" or Bahasa Kon, Kon being perhaps derived from the Austroasiatic word for "people".

== Classification ==
The Orang Seletar language is a member of the Austronesian family of languages, which includes languages from Southeast Asia and the Pacific Ocean. Although these languages are not necessarily mutually intelligible to any extent, their similarities are often quite apparent. In more conservative languages like Malay, many roots have come with relatively little change from their common ancestor, the Proto-Austronesian language. Orang Seletar is part of the Malayic subgroup, and is related to Malay. Ethnologue assigns it to the Malay macrolanguage. It shows over 90% similarity with Malay, and thus can be considered a dialect; however, it is mutually unintelligible.

== Range ==
The Orang Laut people inhabit the islands in the Riau Archipelago, southwest Kalimantan, the southern coast of Johor and Singapore. The Orang Seletar people however live only on the southern coast of Johor, and formerly the northern coast of Singapore, around the Tebrau River and along the Straits of Johor. The Orang Seletar now only live in 9 villages along the south of Johor Bahru and Pasir Gudang, namely: Kampung Teluk Kabung, Kampung Simpang Arang, Kampung Sungai Temun, Kampung Bakar Batu, Kampung Pasir Salam, Kampung Pasir Putih, Kampung Kuala Masai, Kampung Teluk Jawa and Kampung Kong Kong.

== Writing System ==
Orang Seletar has no indigenous writing system, although multiple authors have used different orthographies to represent it: Tan (2023) and Blissett & Elzinga (2017) use the International Phonetic Alphabet and Juma'at uses an adapted form of the Malay alphabet.

== Phonology ==
=== Consonants ===
The consonants of Orang Seletar are as follows:

		Labial	Dental/ Alveolar	Post‑alv./ Palatal	Velar	Glottal
Nasal		m	n	ɲ	ŋ	
Stop/ Affricate	voiceless	p	t	t͡ʃ	k	ʔ
Stop/ Affricate	voiced	b	d	d͡ʒ	ɡ	
Fricative			s		r [ɣ]	h
Approximant		w	l	j		

- Voiced stops /b d ɡ/ along with /k/ may not appear in coda position.
- All palatal/postalveolar phonemes /ɲ t͡ʃ d͡ʒ j/ along with /w/ may not appear in coda position.
- /r/ has an allophone [ɣ].

=== Vowels ===
The nucleus of Orang Seletar can be made up of one or two vowels or a syllabic consonant; V₁(V₂), where V₂ is optional and may be any vowel except /e/. The vowels are shown below, with their allophones in brackets.

	Front	Central	Back
Close	i (e)		u
Mid	e (ɛ)	ə (ɤ)	o (ɔ)
Open		a (ə)	

=== Phonotactics ===
Seletar follows a C₁V₁(V₂)(C₂) syllable structure. Alternatively, V₁(V₂) may be replaced with C̩ (a syllabic consonant).

== Vocabulary ==
According to French ethnologist Christian Pelras's data, 85% of Seletar words were Malay, with the main differences consisting of shortened words and the loss of certain intermediate sounds. For example, the Malay word darat ("land”) takes the form da' in Seletar; the Malay nyamuk ("mosquito") becomes nye'; the Malay jawab ("answer") becomes job; and so on. Another 5% of Seletar words also occur in Malay, but have slightly different meanings. For example, tanah means "land" in Malay but tana "dirt" in Seletar; adik means "younger brother" in Malay but Seletar has adi' "child"; and tebal means "thick" and "wide" respectively. The remaining 10% of Seletar words have no equivalents in Malay. Some of them appear to have counterparts in certain languages spoken on the island of Kalimantan; however, there are also words for which Pelras was unable to find any equivalents. Of particular interest when considering the relationship among the languages of the Malay peoples of Peninsular Malaysia is the fact that among the 15% of non-Malay words in Seletar, there are almost none that are shared with the neighboring Duanoʼ language.

Fresh data obtained through field research were published in 2015 by Kevin Blissett and Dirk Elzinga. As a result of interviewing Seletar speakers, they compiled a list of basic vocabulary corresponding to the Swadesh list. The respondents' answers were recorded on a digital voice recorder and then transcribed using IPA. Like Pelras's findings, these data document a close lexical relationship between Seletar and Malay. Many words are exactly the same as their corresponding Malay words; others are derived from Malay words through simple phonological changes. A small group of words appears to be unique to the language, with no obvious connection to Malay.

Comparison of Vocabulary between Malay and Seletar
English Translation	Malay	Malay (IPA)	Orang Seletar
road; path	jalan	dʒalan	dʒan
hand	tangan	taŋan	kɔkɔk
nose	hidung	hiduŋ	hidoŋ
to laugh	ketawa	kətawa	tɔʔ
to bite	gigit	gigit	gigit
I; 1SG	saya	saja	kamiʔ
one	satu	satu	satuʔ
two	dua	dua	dua
three	tiga	tiga	tiga
four	empat	əmpat	mpat
five	lima	lima	lima
six	enam	ənam	ənam
seven	tujuh	tujuh	tudʒo
eight	lapan	lapan	(l)apan
nine	sembilan	səmbilan	səmbilan
ten	sepuluh	səpuluh	səpulo

== Grammar ==
Similar to Malay, Seletar does not have grammatical gender. Verbs are not inflected, and nouns do not decline for case. Seletar is an agglutinative language, and new words are formed by four methods: attaching affixes onto a root word (affixation), formation of a compound word (composition), repetition of words or portions of words (reduplication) or removing some intermediary sounds in words (clipping).

=== Affixation ===
Seletar verbs typically appear unaffixed, and information such as transitivity are interpreted based on context. Nominal affixes in Seletar usually carry derivative meanings. The verbal and nominal affixes seen in Seletar are shown here with their Standard Malay counterparts:

Seletar Affix	Malay Affix	English Gloss	Example Seletar	Example Malay	English Translation
N-, mə(N)-	mêng-	EVENT	tuŋgu → nuŋgu	tunggu → menunggu	to wait → to wait for
di-	di-	PASS	sədut → di-sədut	sedut → disedut	to suck → be sucked
bə-	bêr-	CONT/STAT/POSSN	dʒan → bə-dʒan	jalan → berjalan	road → to walk
tə-	têr-	PFV/INVOL	ekot → tə-ekot	ikut → terikut	to follow → to accidentally follow
-kan	-kan	TRANS	ekot → ekot-kan	ikut → ikutkan	to follow → to follow along
pə- (-an)	pêr-, pên(g)	NMLZ	lindoŋ → pə-lindoŋ	lindung → pêrlindung	to protect → shelter
-an	-an	RSLT	adʒar → adʒar-an	ajar → ajaran	to teach → lesson
kə- (-an)	kê- -an	ABSTR	turun → kə-turun-an	turun → keturunan	to descend → ancestry

=== Composition ===
Compounds in Seletar can be formed from elements of different syntactic categories. Most commonly, the compounds formed are noun + noun, but other types exist. For example, masa "time" and budak "kid" can be combined to form masa budak "childhood". Noun + adjectives and verb + verb compounds also exist: uŋ asli "Orang Asli" is composed of the words for "people" and "original", while campo gaol "mix around" is composed of the words for "to mix" and "to mingle". Some words exist where words from minor classes are compounded, however this usually involves truncation: talada "unable" may be composed from tak "NEG" + ala "able" + ada "EXIST".

=== Reduplication ===
Seletar mainly uses full reduplication, while partial reduplication is rare. Full reduplication repeats the entire root, while partial reduplication repeats only part of the root. Some reduplicated forms also contain additional affixes. For example, səsama comes from the reduplication of the first consonant and an added schwa of the root word sama. Nouns are normally number-neutral, but reduplicated nouns commonly express plurality: anak means child, anak-anak means children; jaman means era, jaman-jaman means eras. The reduplication of verbs indicates that the action is being done repetitively or continuously. Additionally, reduplicated interrogative pronouns form indeterminates. Reduplication can also be used to add emphasis:

am iŋat la sit~sit
1SG remember PAR little~EMPH
I remember, a little bit.

=== Clipping ===
Like many colloquial Malay varieties, Seletar speakers use words that are shorter and reduced in form compared to Standard or Formal Malay, or in some cases, Seletar itself:

Seletar Clipping	Standard Malay/Seletar	English Translation
tak	tidak	NEG
da	sudah	COMPL
nak	hendak	want
ja	sahaja	only
tu	itu	that
də/kat	dekat	near, at
takda	tidak ada	NEG.EXIST
takpa	tidak apa	never mind
ka	ika (Note: This word is unique to Seletar and is not found in Malay)	this
sən jə	macam jə (Note: This word is unique to Seletar and is not found in Malay)	like so

== In popular culture ==
During the 2026 National Day Parade in Singapore, Orang Laut singer Asnida Daud performed a song in the Orang Seletar language titled Aok Diko which translates to "Yes, of course" in English.

== Sources ==
- Kruspe, Nicole (2004). A Grammar of Semelai. Cambridge Grammatical Descriptions. Cambridge: Cambridge University Press. ISBN 0-521-81497-9.
