= Carl Friedrik =

British luggage and accessories company

- Company type: Private
- Industry: Luggage, leather goods
- Founded: 2013
- Founders: Niklas Oppermann, Mattis Oppermann
- Headquarters: London, United Kingdom
- Products: Luggage, briefcases, backpacks, accessories

Carl Friedrik is a British travel goods brand based in London. It was founded in 2013 by Swedish brothers Niklas and Mattis Oppermann. The company produces leather goods, luggage and travel accessories inspired by Scandinavian design principles.

== History ==
Carl Friedrik was established in 2013 in London by Swedish-born brothers Niklas and Mattis Oppermann. The brand began with handcrafted leather wallets and briefcases before expanding into luggage in 2019.

The company gained wider recognition when its products appeared in the television series Succession, The White Lotus and The Gentlemen.

In 2024, Carl Friedrik opened its first standalone retail store in London. The opening followed the company securing a £1 million investment to expand its retail presence.

In 2025, Carl Friedrik opened its second store, a boutique on Floral Street in Covent Garden.

== Collaborations and partnerships ==
Carl Friedrik has collaborated with British menswear label Hackett London on limited-edition luggage collections.

In 2023, the company signed a licensing deal with Formula One team Atlassian Williams Racing to produce co-branded travel products, having previously served as the Official Luggage Partner of Scuderia AlphaTauri (now Racing Bulls).

== Products ==
Carl Friedrik manufactures luggage, briefcases, backpacks, and small accessories. Early collections focused on leather briefcases such as the Palissy line, later expanding to hard-shell suitcases and travel backpacks.

The company’s luggage has been widely reviewed. Wired described The Carry-on as "handsome and durable," but noted that it was heavier than some rivals. T3 considered The Carry-on X well-constructed with useful interior features, though relatively expensive compared to competitors. Town & Country highlighted the same model’s sturdiness and practicality for frequent travel, while The Independent noted its premium build quality.

Other products have received similar attention. Escape described the Palissy Double briefcase as a well-crafted business bag, while The Independent highlighted its durability and understated design. The Manual found the Traverse Backpack practical for commuting and short trips, though less spacious than some larger models.

== Reception ==
The Times positioned the brand within the trend for “quiet luxury,” noting its focus on understated design and materials. CNN described the company’s luggage as solidly built but also pointed out its cost relative to mass-market options. House Beautiful reached a similar conclusion, praising the quality but suggesting it may not suit budget-conscious travellers and Esquire UK noted that its suitcases balance visual appeal with practicality.

The brand has also appeared in comparative buyer’s guides. The New York Times Wirecutter recommended it among carry-on options,

== Awards ==
In 2022, The Carry-on X was awarded the "Wallpaper Smart Space Award" in the Smart Luggage category, followed by an iF Product Design Award in 2024.

== See also ==
- Luxury goods
