= Frederick Gore =

British painter (1913–2009)

- Born: 8 November 1913
- Died: 31 August 2009 (aged 95)
- Education: Slade, Westminster School of Art
- Known for: Painting
- Movement: impressionist

Frederick John Pym Gore CBE RA (8 November 1913 – 31 August 2009), was an English painter.

== Biography ==
Gore was born into the world of art; his father, Spencer Frederick Gore, was a painter, President of the Camden Town Group until his early death in March 1914, and his mother, Mary Joanna (Molly) Kerr, was a dancer from Edinburgh.

As a young man Gore's ambition was to be a philosopher, but as a student at Trinity College, Oxford (following in the steps of his great uncle Bishop Charles Gore), he soon found that his real passion was for drawing and painting at the Ruskin School of Art which he attended almost daily.

Leaving Oxford, and arriving in London, Gore trained at the Slade under Henry Tonks and at the Westminster School of Art with Mark Gertler and Polunin from whom he learnt the flat-on-the-floor method of painting backdrops for the theatre: most useful later on when as an active member of the Balalaika Dance Group as dancer and organiser of events, he enhanced their productions with his professional expertise. He wrote a very successful folk ballet.

Pre-World War II, his career took off when a Greek patron saw his work and asked him to spend a year travelling and painting in Greece. Visits and extended sojourns to France followed, and an exhibition at Gallery Borghese in Paris in 1938 when Vauxelles called him the English fauve. Soon after, however, he was forced to leave and return to the UK.

During World War II, Gore was camouflage officer for the south-east and helped prepare the troops for the D-Day invasion.

In 1946, he began teaching at Saint Martin's School of Art, where he was Head of Painting from 1951 until 1979. In 1961 he was appointed Vice-Principal of Saint Martin's; he retired from the post in 1979. His students and colleagues there included many of the most accomplished artists of the twentieth century who continue to acknowledge the encouragement they received from Gore.

Summer months for many years were spent painting outside: on the Greek islands of Paros (1950s) and later on Aegina. Then during the 1960s, the rich hinterland of Mallorca, followed by the brilliantly-lit landscapes of Provence.

He exhibited at the Redfern Gallery until they took to abstract art, the Juster Gallery (NY), Fosse, Lavenham, Richmond Hill Gallery – always keeping his independence to exhibit wherever he so wanted.

Gore was a trustee of the Imperial War Museum (1967–1984), and was chairman of its Artistic Records Committee (1972–1986).

In 1972, Gore was elected as a Royal Academician, and from 1976 to 1987 he was chairman of the Royal Academy of Arts Exhibitions Committee.

In 1980, Gore visited the US for the first time to deliver a dissertation at the Yale Center for British Art, New Haven, Connecticut. Gore was made CBE in 1987.

In 1991 he designed a series of posters for the London Transport Museum.

His last solo exhibition was at the Richmond Hill Gallery, London (January 2009).

His published books include "Abstract Art", "Painting: Some Basic Principles" and "The Baptism, Piero della Francesca"; he is also the author of an unpublished translation of poems by Baudelaire.

Gore died age 95 on 31 August 2009. He is buried in Brompton Cemetery.

== Personal life ==
Frederick Gore had a son and two daughters – Charles David Gore, Georgiana Sarah Gore, and Geraldine Lucy Gore. His wife Constance (Connie) survived him.
