= Pulau Buloh =

Island in Singapore

Name transcription(s)
  - Malay: Pulau Buloh
  - Chinese: 布洛岛
  - Pinyin: bùluò dǎo
  - English: Buloh Island
- Interactive map of Pulau Buloh
- Coordinates: 1°27′0″N 103°43′30″E
- Country: Singapore

Area
  - Total: 1.3 km^{2} (0.50 sq mi)

Pulau Buloh is an uninhabited island located at the northern end of the Sungei Buloh Wetland Reserve with a total size of 1.3 square kilometres (0.5 square miles). The island is uninhabited and is entirely covered in mangrove forests. It also acts as a conservation site for wild animals that inhabit the nature reserve.

== Etymology ==
The island is named after buloh, the Malay word for bamboo, suggesting that bamboo was prominent around the area. It is not known what species of bamboo Pulau Buloh is named after, but it was recorded that the island had Bambusa vulgaris, or the common bamboo.

== History ==
Mangroves first appeared in the area c. 5000BC (6820 BP), as the flooding of Sundaland caused sea levels to rise due to the retreat of ice during the last glacial maximum. Pulau Buloh, which had plentiful mangrove swamps, was designated as a forest reserve in the 19th century. By the start of the 20th century, the island saw agricultural activities taking place, such as farming cash crops, prawn ponds, and farming freshwater fish, though by the 1980s, prawn farming was the dominant activity.

In 1986, the Singapore government marked Pulau Buloh for agro-industrial development. Around that time, birdwatcher Richard Hale observed birds flying to Pulau Buloh, and with assistance from the Singaporean branch of the Malayan Nature Society, created a movement for Pulau Buloh's bird species and habitat to be protected; they proposed to create a nature reserve in Pulau Buloh.

Despite the intensive development of fish and prawn farms beside the island throughout its history on mainland Singapore, the island has mostly been uninhabited to the present day, with no accessible routes to easily travel to Pulau Buloh. Sluice gates have been installed on the island to manage water levels in the reserve to prevent flooding. However, flooding at high tides have occurred due to aging equipment affecting the efficiency of the gates.

== Geology ==
The soil of the island and the nature reserve encompassing it is similar to adjacent areas in the Sungei Buloh Nature Reserve which are also similar to other coastal areas in Singapore. Thin layers of alluvium are present near the surface, while soft clay and decomposed vegetation can be found at depths of 25 metres. Further down, hard clay silts interspersed with sand occupy the layer below. Water ponds found on the island are mostly brackish in nature and water levels at the coastline of the island fluctuate with tide levels recorded in the Straits of Johor. Migratory birds flock to the island during high tide when feeding areas are flooded. The surface layer soil found on the island date back to the Holocene era and are at least more than 3.8 metres deep.

== Wildlife ==
Bird species such as the white-bellied sea eagle (Haliaeetus leucogaster) can be found on the island. It is one of the last remaining undeveloped islands left in Singapore that consist entirely of vegetation. However, mangroves in the surrounding area are at risk of retreating, with mangrove cover in the area being 25% less than in 1946, in a study conducted in 1992. Several species of birds such as the Pacific golden plover (Pluvialis fulva) and the Eurasian whimbrel (Numenius phaeopus) can also be found flying around the island.

== Gallery ==
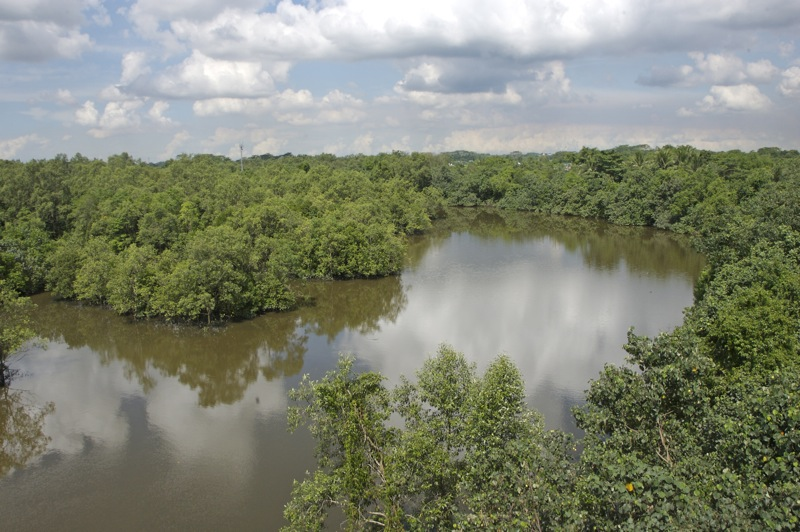
A tree-top view of the nature reserve. Pulau Buloh can be seen on the left.
