= Oleg Polunin =

- Олег Полунин
- Born: Oleg Vladimirovitch Polunin; 28 November 1914; Reading, Berkshire England, UKGBI
- Died: 1 July 1985 (aged 70); Godalming, Surrey, England, UK
- Education: Magdalen College, Oxford, 1937
- Occupations: Botanist; traveller; educator
- Known for: Flowers of Europe (1969)
- Spouse: Lorna Mary Polunin (m. 1943)
- Children: 2
- Parents: Vladimir Polunin (father); Elizabeth Polunin (mother)
- Relatives: Nicholas Polunin (brother); Ivan Polunin (brother)
- Scientific career
- Fields: Botany
- Author abbrev. (botany): O. V. Polunin

Oleg Vladimirovitch Polunin (Russian: Олег Владимирович Полунин; 28 November 1914 – 1 July 1985) was a British botanist, traveller and educator.

== Early life and education ==
Polunin was born Oleg Vladimirovitch Polunin on 28 November 1914 in Reading, Berkshire to a Russian father and a British mother. Polunin's father, Vladimir Polunin, was a scenographer, set designer and educator and his mother, Elizabeth Polunin, was an artist and theatre designer. The second of four siblings, Polunin was the brother of the botanist Nicholas Polunin, the physician Ivan Polunin, and the piano teacher Tanya Polunin (1921–2009).

Educated at St Paul's School, Polunin later enrolled at Magdalen College, Oxford where he studied botany. Polunin graduated in 1937.

== Career ==
For over 30 years, Oleg Polunin taught at Charterhouse School in Godalming, Surrey, later devoting his time to writing popular and authoritative guides to the flora of Europe and the Himalaya. His most well-known work is Flowers of Europe (1969), a classic text for both botanists and general readers. Polunin travelled widely in pursuit of samples and photographs, and he discovered several new species. He was awarded the Linnean Society’s H. H. Bloomer Award in 1983.

== Personal life ==
In April 1943, Polunin married Lorna Mary Polunin (née Venning). The couple had two children.

From 1939 to 1947, Polunin was the brother-in-law of the writer Helen Fraser.

On 1 July 1985, Polunin died from motor neurone disease in Godalming, Surrey aged 70.

== Selected books ==
- Flowers of the Mediterranean (Chatto & Windus, 1967)
- Flowers of Europe: a field guide (Oxford University Press, 1969)
- A Concise Flowers of Europe (Oxford University Press, 1972)
- Flowers of South West Europe (Oxford University Press, 1973, ISBN 0-19-217625-0)
- Trees and Bushes of Europe (Oxford University Press, 1976)
- Flowers of Greece and the Balkans (Oxford University Press, 1980, ISBN 0-19-217626-9)
- Flowers of the Himalaya (Oxford University Press, 1985)
- A Guide to the Vegetation of Britain and Europe (Oxford University Press, 1985, ISBN 0-19-217713-3)
- Concise Flowers of the Himalaya (Oxford University Press, 1987)
- Collins Photoguide to Wild Flowers of Britain and Northern Europe (Collins, 1988, ISBN 0-00-219709-X)
