= Claud Lovat Fraser =

British artist, designer and author (1890–1921)

- Born: Lovat Claud Fraser; 15 May 1890; London, England
- Died: 18 June 1921 (aged 31); Dymchurch, Kent, England
- Other name: C.Lovat Fraser
- Education: Westminster School of Art
- Known for: Painting, drawing
- Spouse: Grace Inez Crawford (m. 1917)
- Children: 1
- Relatives: Nicholas Polunin (ex-son-in-law)

Claud Lovat Fraser (né Lovat Claud Fraser; 15 May 1890 – 18 June 1921), also known as C.Lovat Fraser, was a British artist, designer and author.

== Early life ==
Fraser was born Lovat Claud Fraser on 15 May 1890 to Claud Fraser, a solicitor, Florence Margaret Fraser (née Walsh) an amateur harpist and artist. Educated at Windlesham House School and Charterhouse and after leaving school in 1907, aged 17, he commenced legal studies and he entered his father's firm as an Articled Clerk a year later, but he was always more interested in becoming an artist. In 1911 his father released him from his Articles, he left the firm and began to pursue a career in art.

After a year at the Westminster School of Art where his tutors included Walter Sickert he began to create a career for himself. He found an influential friend and supporter in the art critic Haldane MacFall and as an early commission executed illustrations for MacFall's essay on art and aesthetics entitled The Splendid Wayfaring. Through MacFall he also gained an introduction to the Actor Manager Sir Herbert Beerbohm Tree, proprietor of His Majesty's Theatre in Haymarket. Tree in turn, at MacFall's instigation, commissioned him to supply the illustrations for Thoughts and Afterthoughts, his volume of reminiscences and also gave him free run of his private suite in the theatre's dome; Fraser began to get to know theatre people, and they him. However Tree subsequently declined, in January 1914, a proposed theatre piece The Three Students written by MacFall with designs by Fraser.

In 1913, along with Holbrook Jackson and the poet Ralph Hodgson, Lovat Fraser established a small publishing firm called The Sign of the Flying Fame to produce decorative poetry broadsides and chapbooks. Although printed in limited editions and often hand-coloured, they were affordably priced and were intended to make poetry more accessible to the general public.

== World War One ==
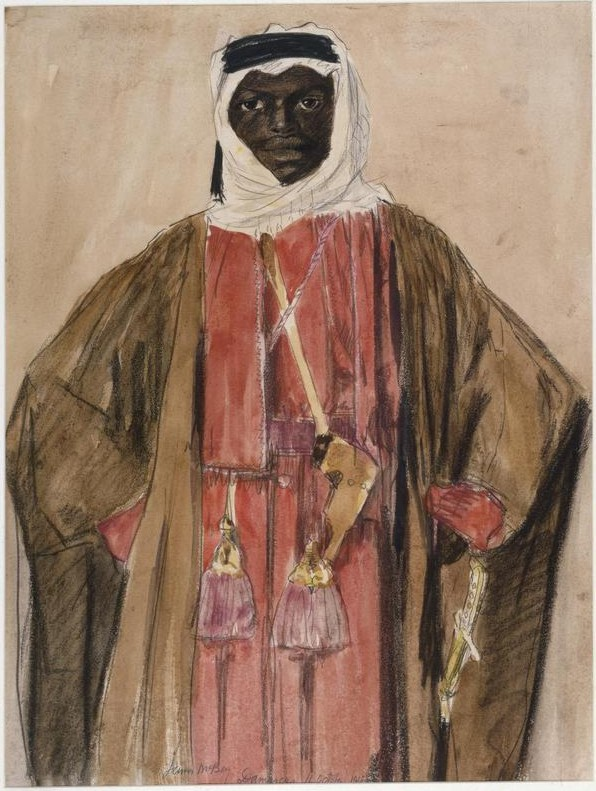
Behind the British Front (1916) (Art.IWM ART 156)

In October 1914 Fraser enlisted with the Inns of Court Officers' Training Corps, and was quickly commissioned into the 14th Battalion of the Durham Light Infantry. After a year's training, in September 1915 the Battalion was sent out to France as part of 21st Division, one of three Reserve divisions for the forthcoming Battle of Loos. Fraser was fortunate to survive that battle unscathed; many of his battalion's officers were killed or wounded and a quarter of its men also became casualties. In December of that year, by now serving in the Ypres Salient, the battalion withstood a German gas attack in which Fraser may have suffered injuries to his lungs. He was promoted to captain in early 1916 but in mid-February that year he was invalided home, suffering from shellshock. During his period on active service he had produced many sketches, of the battlefields and of life behind the lines. Several of these sketches were submitted to the Imperial War Museum who purchased six of them in November 1917. Through continuing poor health he was never again sent abroad. He served as a clerk in the War Office on visual propaganda from October 1916 through to late April 1917, then at the Army Record Office in Hounslow until his discharge in March 1919.

In August 1916 Fraser met the American-born actress Grace Inez Crawford in her theatre dressing room. By Grace's description he was ‘tall, brown-haired and hazel-eyed, big-boned with a very fine white skin and a beautifully moulded Grecian mouth’. Grace's career interests contributed to Fraser's increased involvement in theatrical and costume design.

== Later life ==
After the war Fraser made designs for the Harold Monro's Poetry Bookshop and for the Curwen Press. He also executed private commissions for bookplates, stationery and greeting cards. In 1919 he produced the designs for Nigel Playfair's ground-breaking production of As You Like It in Stratford upon Avon, then in 1920 for Playfair's highly successful London revival of John Gay's The Beggar's Opera.

During this period Grace and Lovat Fraser became friendly with Paul Nash. They were introduced by Nash and his wife to Dymchurch in Kent, where the two families holidayed together. On one such holiday there in 1921 Lovat was taken seriously ill. He died in a local nursing home on 18 June, after a surgical operation for obstruction of the bowel the previous day. He had a history of heart trouble following on an episode of rheumatic fever as a young man; by the time he left the Army this was already becoming severe. Neither his gassing in 1915, his smoking habit nor – latterly – his weight can have helped.

A memorial exhibition of his work was held in December 1921 at the Leicester Galleries in London.

His name is inscribed on Buntingford War Memorial which he designed while living in the town.

== Personal life ==
On 6 February 1917, Fraser married the American singer Grace Inez Crawford. Fraser and Crawford had one daughter, the writer Helen Catherine Adeline Lovat Fraser (c. 1917–1973). From 1939 to 1947, Helen was married to the botanist, environmentalist, arctic explorer and writer Nicholas Polunin.
