= Vladimir Polunin =

Russian scenographer, set designer and educator (1880–1957)

- Владимир Полунин
- Born: Vladimir Jacolievitch Polunin; 1880; Moscow, Moscow Governorate, Russian Empire
- Died: 11 March 1957 (aged 76–77); Godalming, Surrey, England, UK
- Occupations: Scenographer; set designer; educator
- Spouse: Elizabeth Polunin (m. 1907; died 1950)
- Children: 4 including, Nicholas Polunin; Oleg Polunin; Ivan Polunin

Vladimir Jacolievitch Polunin (Note: Also anglicised as Vladimir Yakovlevich Polunin.) (Russian: Владимир Яковлевич Полунин; 1880 – 11 March 1957) was a Russian scenographer, set designer and educator.

== Biography ==
Polunin was born in 1880 in Moscow, Moscow Governorate (present-day Moscow Oblast, Russia) to Yasha Akimovich Polunin (Note: Also cited as Jakof Akimovich Polunin.) and Olya Okorokova. Polunin was the youngest of five siblings. He earned a degree in forestry in St. Petersburg and later studied art in Munich and Paris, specializing in tempera and distemper painting. In 1908 Polunin and his wife moved to England and settled in London.

By 1914, Polunin was working with Boris Anisfeld on the designs for Vaslav Nijinsky's ill-fated season at the Palace Theatre. In 1918 he began working on the Ballets Russes of Sergei Diaghilev, creating stage sets from artists' designs, and maintained and restored stage cloths. He eventually became Diaghilev's chief scene-painter. At this time, Pablo Picasso painted sets under his direction. In 1929, he founded the stage painting department at the Slade School of Fine Art, teaching there for 20 years.

Polunin's 1957 book Three Generations: Family Life in Russia, 1845–1902 was published posthumously.

== Personal life ==
On 1 September 1908 (O.S.) (Note: Also cited as 1907.), Polunin married the artist and scenic designer Elizabeth Polunin (née Hart) in St. Petersburg. The couple had four children, the botanists Nicholas Polunin and Oleg Polunin, the physician Ivan Polunin, and the piano teacher Tanya Polunin.

Polunin died on 11 March 1957 in Godalming, Surrey.

== Publication ==
- The Continental Method of Scene Painting: Seven Years With the Diaghileff Company.
- Polunin, Vladimir (1957). Three Generations: Family Life in Russia, 1845–1902. Translated by Birch-Jones, A.F. London: Leonard Hill.
