= Nicholas Polunin =

British botanist, environmentalist and writer (1909–1997)

- Born: Nicholas Vladimir Polunin; 26 June 1909; Checkendon, Oxfordshire, UKGBI
- Died: 8 December 1997 (aged 88); Geneva, Switzerland
- Education: Christ Church, Oxford, BA, 1932; Yale University, MS, 1934
- Occupations: Botanist; environmentalist; arctic explorer; writer
- Spouses: Helen Catherine Adeline Lovat Fraser (m. 1939; div. 1947); Helen Eugenie Campbell (m. 1948)
- Children: 4
- Parents: Vladimir Polunin (father); Elizabeth Polunin (mother)
- Relatives: Oleg Polunin (brother); Ivan Polunin (brother); Claud Lovat Fraser (ex-father-in-law); Grace Inez Crawford (ex-mother-in-law)
- Scientific career
- Author abbrev. (botany): Polunin

Nicholas Vladimir Polunin (26 June 1909 – 8 December 1997) was a British botanist, environmentalist, arctic explorer and writer.

== Biography ==
Polunin was born on 26 June 1909 in Checkendon, Oxfordshire to Vladimir Polunin, a scenographer, set designer and educator, and Elizabeth Polunin, an artist and theatre designer. The eldest of four siblings, Polunin was brother of the botanist Oleg Polunin (1914–1985), the physician Ivan Polunin (1920–2010), and the piano teacher Tanya Polunin (1921–2009). Educated at Latymer Upper School, Polunin later enrolled at Christ Church, Oxford in 1928 to study botany and ecology. Graduating with his Bachelor's in 1932, Polunin later earnt his Master's from Yale University in 1934.

== Personal life ==
On 26 August 1939, married Helen Catherine Adeline Lovat Fraser (c. 1917–1973) a writer and the daughter of Claud Lovat Fraser and Grace Inez Crawford. Polunin and Fraser had one son before later dissolving their marriage in 1947. Polunin later married Helen Eugenie Campbell on 3 January 1948, with whom he had three children.

On 8 December 1997, Polunin died in Geneva, Switzerland.

== Publications ==
- Polunin, Vladimir (1931). Russian Waters.
- Polunin, Vladimir (1932). The Isle of Auks. London: Edward Arnold & co.
- Polunin, Vladimir (1949). Arctic Unfolding. Experiences And Observations During A Canadian Airborne Expedition In Northern Ungava, The Northwest Territories, And Their Arctic Archipelago. London: Hutchinson & Co.
- Polunin, Vladimir, ed. (1972). The Environmental Future.Proceedings of the First International Conference on Environmental Future, Held in Finland from 27 June to 3 July 1971. London: Palgrave Macmillan. ISBN 9781349014583.
- Polunin, Vladimir (1990). Maintenance of the Biosphere.
