= Grace Lovat Fraser =

American costume designer (1889–1977)

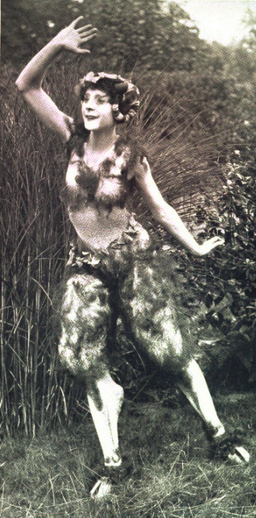
- Grace Crawford in costume (The Tatler, 1916)
- Born: Grace Inez Crawford; 1889; Paris, France
- Died: 1977 (aged 87–88); London, England, UK
- Occupations: singer, actress, costume designer, writer
- Notable work: In the Days of My Youth
- Spouse: Claud Lovat Fraser (m. 1917; died 1921)
- Children: Helen Catherine Adeline Lovat Fraser (daughter)
- Parents: Theron Clark Crawford (father); Inez Rouene Joyce Randall (mother)
- Relatives: Nicholas Polunin (son-in-law)

Grace Lovat Fraser (born Grace Inez Crawford; 1889–1977) was an American singer, actress, costume designer, translator of plays, and author of several books.

== Biography ==
Crawford was born in Paris in 1889, daughter of Theron Clark Crawford, an American entrepreneur, and a highly trained amateur pianist and Inez Rouene Joyce Randall. Her father's professional projects (including work with Buffalo Bill Cody's "Wild West Show") caused the family to reside in various European and American cities, but England was considered home. Crawford's circle of acquaintances in London included Ezra Pound, Ford Madox Ford, Violet Hunt, William Butler Yeats, and D. H. Lawrence. Crawford received training in voice, ballet, piano, and music theory, as well as French, German and Italian.

She met her future husband, artist Claud Lovat Fraser, during a fitting for a faun costume for Hugo Rumbold's adaptation of L'Apres-midi d'un Faune. After a brief courtship, they were married February 6, 1917. During the next four years, the two worked jointly on a number of theatre projects, including La Serva Padrona and 'The Liar' (both of which Crawford translated), and Fraser's long-running production of The Beggar's Opera. Their daughter, Helen Catherine Adeline Lovat Fraser, was born in 1918.

After her husband's sudden death in 1921, Grace Lovat Fraser promoted and protected his artistic legacy through exhibitions and publications. She continued her own work in singing and in costume design, working with prominent music and theatre figures of the time, including composer Arthur Bliss, Sergei Diaghilev, and Nigel Playfair. Tamara Karsavina, the Russian ballerina, was a lifelong friend.

Fraser also worked in other design-related businesses. In 1923 she formed a firm with Norman Wilkinson and a Mr. Trevelean that specialized in scenery and dress for the theatre, interior decoration for the home, hand printed fabrics, and "modern" clothing. She was editor of the magazine Art and Industry, worked in the design departments of Schweppes and Venesta Limited, and served for a time on the Research and Industrial Design Advisory Departments of Pritchard, Wood & Partners, Ltd.

Her memoirs, In the Days of My Youth, was published in 1970.

Fraser died in 1977 in London, England.

== Published works ==
- Doll Making at Home (1940)
- Textiles in Britain (1948)
- In the Days of My Youth (1970)
