= Floral Street =

Street in London

Coordinates: 51°30′44″N 0°07′29″W

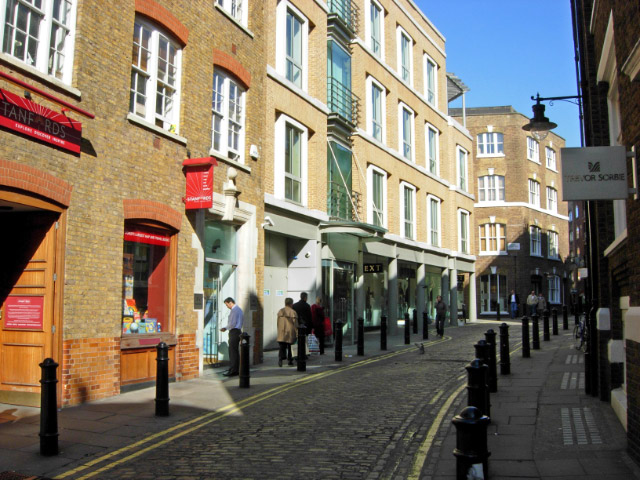
View of Floral Street

Floral Street is a narrow street in the Covent Garden area of London, England. It runs east from Garrick Street to Bow Street and contains a number of fashion stores, including Paul Smith. The Upper School of the Royal Ballet School is located at 46 Floral Street, across the street from the back of the Royal Opera House.

== History ==
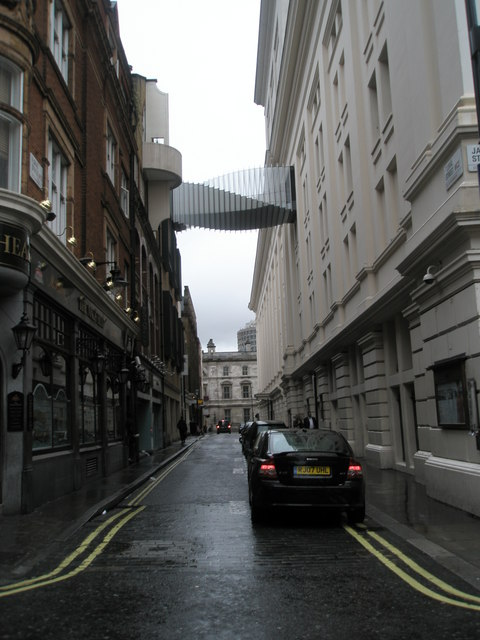
Skybridge between the Royal Ballet School and the Royal Opera House

Originally called Hart Street, it changed to the current name in 1895 to reflect the market trade. However, the street itself was mainly used by tradesmen associated with the fruit market. Originally, the street was a cul-de-sac. Due to its narrowness, the street was never a sought-after residential address in comparison to its surroundings, though Joseph Haines lived and died there in 1701.

The main point of architectural note is the concertina-shaped "Bridge of Aspiration" which connects the Royal Ballet School with the main opera house building across the street. It was designed by WilkinsonEyre to represent the fluid grace of dance.

== Royal Opera House ==
The back of the Royal Opera House is situated along the eastern end of Floral Street. A plaque at No. 48 marks the site of the studio of the artist Elizabeth Polunin, who designed sets and costumes for several opera companies. The plaque records the period Pablo Picasso spent there.

== See also ==
- Covent Garden
