= Ivan Polunin =

British doctor and filmmaker

- Born: Ivan Vladimirovich Polunin; 12 December 1920; London, England, UK
- Died: 21 December 2010 (aged 90); Singapore
- Education: Oxford University
- Occupations: medical doctor, author, teacher, documentary filmmaker, and photographer
- Spouse: Fam Siew Yin
- Children: 2 daughters
- Parents: Vladimir Polunin (father); Elizabeth Polunin (mother)
- Relatives: Nicholas Polunin (brother); Oleg Polunin (brother); Tanya Polunin (sister); Michael Fam (brother-in-law)
- Website: www.ivanpolunin.com

Ivan Vladimirovich Polunin (12 December 1920 – 21 December 2010) was a medical doctor, author, teacher, documentary filmmaker, and photographer. He is best known for his rare colour films, which document cultural traditions and wildlife in Singapore and Malaysia from the 1950s. The films contain important historical and sociological information, and were recently the subject of a local documentaries Lost Images and "Invisible City" which showed his well-preserved film archive. His work has been featured in National Geographic magazine; aired on the BBC and stored in the Smithsonian.

== Early life and education ==
Polunin was born to an English mother, Elizabeth Polunin (née Hart) and Russian father Vladimir Polunin in 12 December 1920, London. He had two brothers: Nicholas Polunin, who later became an arctic explorer and environmentalist, and Oleg Polunin who was a botanist, author, teacher and traveller. He also had a sister, Tanya Polunin, who owned a music school and taught piano.

Polunin visited his uncle's farm during holidays, where he developed and interest in wild flowers and animals. He later studied classics, natural sciences and medicine.

== Career ==
Polunin travelled to Singapore in 1948 to complete his National Service in hospitals in Singapore and Malaya. He remained in Asia, and spent most of his working life teaching medical students in Social Medicine & Public Health in Singapore and researching disease patterns in tribal peoples in Malaya.

Polunin bought an 8 mm film camera for personal use in 1951, and filmed Negrito tribespeople living in limestone caves, and the East Coast Malay fishermen who fished from Siglap in big sailing perahus during the Northeast Monsoon.

Polunin began working as a lecturer in 1952 at the University of Malaya Singapore campus, which then became the National University of Singapore. He used the Department's 16 mm camera to film the way of life and environment of the aboriginal Malayans, and later of the Muruts of North Borneo (Sabah), both now in present-day Malaysia. The Government there had asked him to inquire into the apparent depopulation of the Interior Tribes, and he started the work by doing extensive disease surveys of Longhouse populations. He documented this with a 16mm silent film camera loaded with Kodachrome reversal colour film. For sound he used a Nagra 2C tape recorder. Polunin also contributed a number of articles and book chapters in the field of medical anthropology.

In 1955, Polunin returned to England and showed some of his footage to the BBC which then ran only a single Black and White TV station. They reformatted the 16mm colour film to 35 mm black and white and televised it. From then until 1973 Polunin created a small amount of television footage each year, by shooting silent colour film and then recording a separate narration. The film was edited and assembled at Ealing Studios. The BBC series were Adventure, Travellers Tales, People of Many Lands and World About Us. For Jack Douglas Productions in Hollywood, Polunin shot I Search for Adventure. and Seven League Boots

Polunin authored texts on botany including the Plants & Flowers of Singapore and a counterpart edition on Malaysia. He also contributed to various publications and academic studies including The William Farquhar Collection of Natural History Drawings.

Polunin retired as Associate Professor in 1980. He continued to collect Asian ceramics, and made an extensive study of fireflies. He was fondly remembered by friends and colleagues as "the Father of Fireflies".

== Death ==
Polunin died his home in Singapore on 21 December 2010, aged 90. he was survived by his Chinese Singaporean wife of Hakka Malaysian Chinese descent, Fam Siew Yin (born 1922), the older sister of Michael Fam and cousin of Elizabeth Choy, and two daughters Nadya, a radiologist, and Olga, an artist.

Many of his papers and images have been archived at the Institute of South Asian Studies. His wife Fam outlived him by seven years, only to pass away in 2019, aged 97.
