= William Farquhar Collection of Natural History Drawings =

Collection of drawings from 1819 to 1823

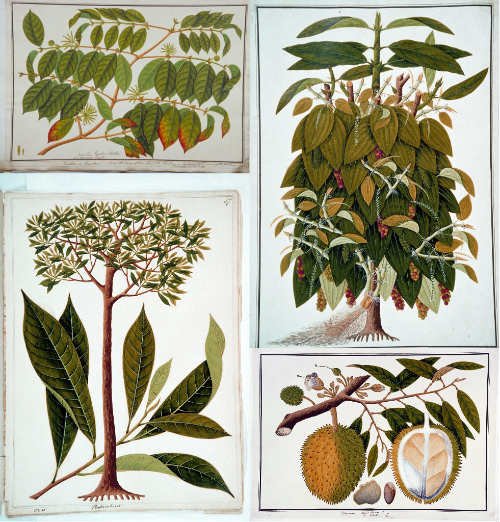
- Top left: gambier; top right: black pepper; bottom left: wild nutmeg (Gymnacranthera farquhariana); bottom right: durian
- Artist: Probably two anonymous Chinese artists (from Macau)
- Year: 1819–1823
- Medium: Watercolour on Paper
- Dimensions: Various
- Location: National Museum of Singapore, Singapore
- Owner: GK Goh Holdings

The William Farquhar Collection of Natural History Drawings is a collection of 477 watercolour botanical drawings of plants and animals of Malacca and Singapore by unknown Chinese (probably Cantonese) artists that were commissioned between 1819 and 1823 by William Farquhar (26 February 1774 – 13 May 1839). The paintings were meant to be of scientific value with very detailed drawings, except for those of the birds which have text going beyond their original purpose. For each drawing, the scientific and/or common name of the specimen in Malay, and occasionally in English, was written in pencil. A translator also penned the Malay names in Jawi using ink. The paper used was normally European paper framed by a blue frame while some have no frames at all suggesting there are two artist.

== History ==
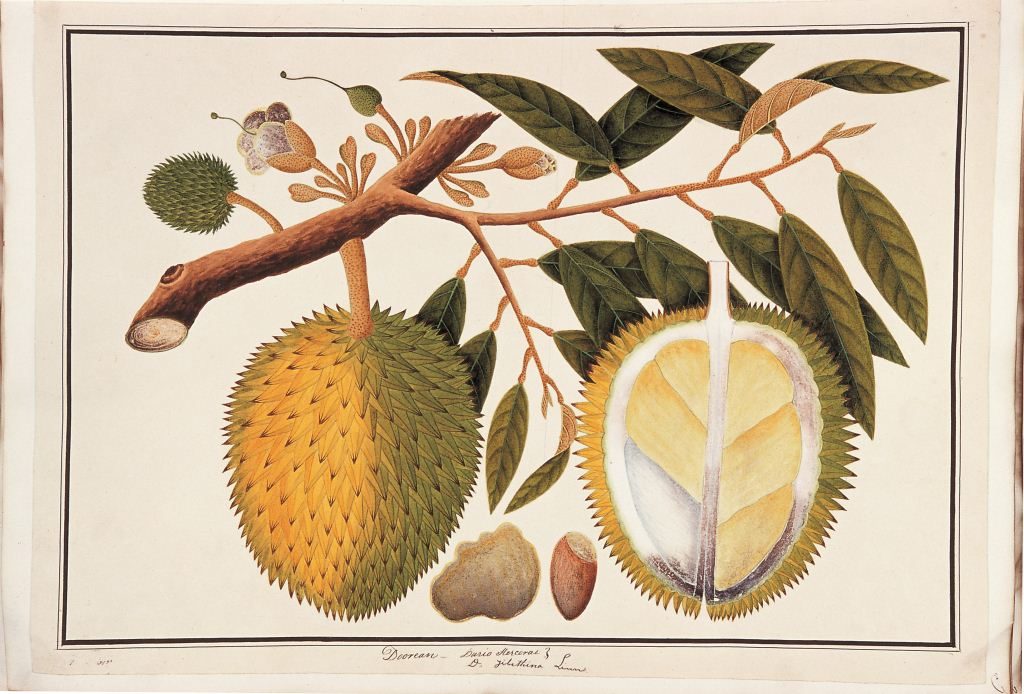
The drawing of this Durian shows a good example of great scientific detail reflecting the inside of the fruit and structure of the seed.

Most of the drawings were made in Malacca, before his tenure as Resident and Commandant of Singapore. On the basis that Raffles hired a Chinese artist from Macao to do natural history drawings (as described by Munshi Abdullah), John Bastin conjectured that this artist and perhaps others were hired by Farquhar to paint watercolours of the flora and fauna of the Malay Peninsula. Kwa Chong Guan extended this conjecture via stylistic comparison to identify the artists of Farquhar's drawings as from Guandong. Farquhar donated these in eight volumes to the Museum of the Royal Asiatic Society of Great Britain and Ireland on 17 June 1826. In 1937, the Society lent six of the volumes to the Library of the British Museum (Natural History) (now the Library of the Natural History Museum), retaining the two volumes of botanical drawings in its own library. In 1991 the Natural History Museum returned the works to the Society for valuation, and on 20 October 1993 the Society offered them for sale by auction at Sotheby's in London, where they were acquired by Goh Geok Khim, founder of the brokerage firm GK Goh, for S$3 million.

Goh donated the drawings to the National Museum of Singapore in 1995.

The drawings was designated by the National Museum of Singapore as one of 11 "national treasures" in January 2006.

As at 2011, the collection was believed to be worth at least $11 million. In 2011, 70 works from the collection were placed on permanent display in the Goh Seng Choo Gallery of the museum, named for Goh's father.

== Controversy ==
Due to the variable quality of work done by some artists, some drawings have proved difficult to identify. Nonetheless, botanists have identified some of these problematic drawings, one a drawing of a male Raffles's malkoha in which the breast is too yellow. Others which have yet to be identified include a drawing of a climber similar to Smilax. Plate 29 of the collection inscription reads Soogow, probably a misspelling of "saga". However, the drawing shows little resemblance to the latter.

Historians suggest that many of the backdrops of the drawings were copied from drawing manuals. One such example is a drawing of the greater mousedeer, the background of which shows a leafless climber attached to a rock. Some scholars query this, as mousedeer do not live in such rocky habitats. This suggests that either the artists did not visit the habitat of the subject, or, if they did, that they were not particularly observant.

In the book Natural History Drawings: The Complete William Farquhar Collection, Malay Peninsula 1803–1818, an article by Kwa Chong Guan suggests that there were two artists, one who usually framed his works as seen in the illustration of the durian and one who did the opposite of the latter. Usually, the artist who drew a frame around his work depicted fungi-like shaped rocks while the other portrayed the rocks in their own natural form. Also, the artist who drew frames usually had drawings of trees with their roots spread out, while the other showed roots in a clench-like manner.

== Books ==
The works were published in two volumes, the first being,The William Farquhar Collection of Natural History Drawings, published in 1999 showing 141 of these illustrations. A second version containing prints of all 477 works in the Farquhar collection was published by Editions Didier Millet and the National Museum of Singapore in 2010.

== Gallery ==
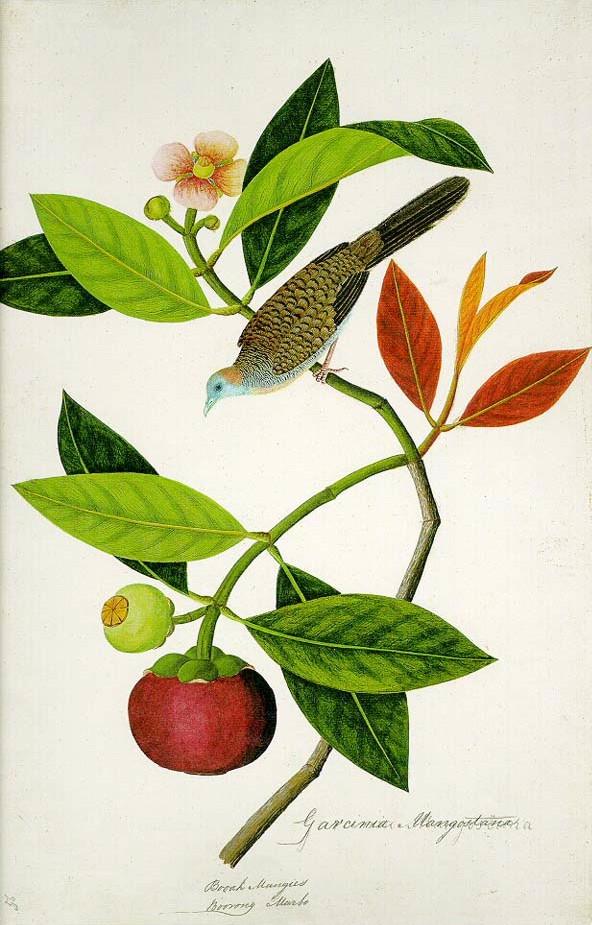
A watercolour drawing of the zebra dove or barred ground dove (Geopelia striata; known in Malay as the burung merbuk) perched on a mangosteen (Garcinia mangostana; Malay buah manggis) branch. It is one of 477 natural history drawings of plants and animals of Malacca and Singapore commissioned by William Farquhar.

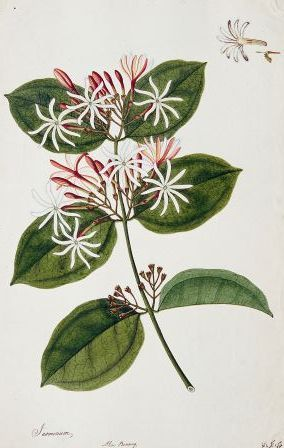
The wild jasmine (Jasminum laurifolium or Jasminum longipetalum, Malay bunga pekan or melur hutan).

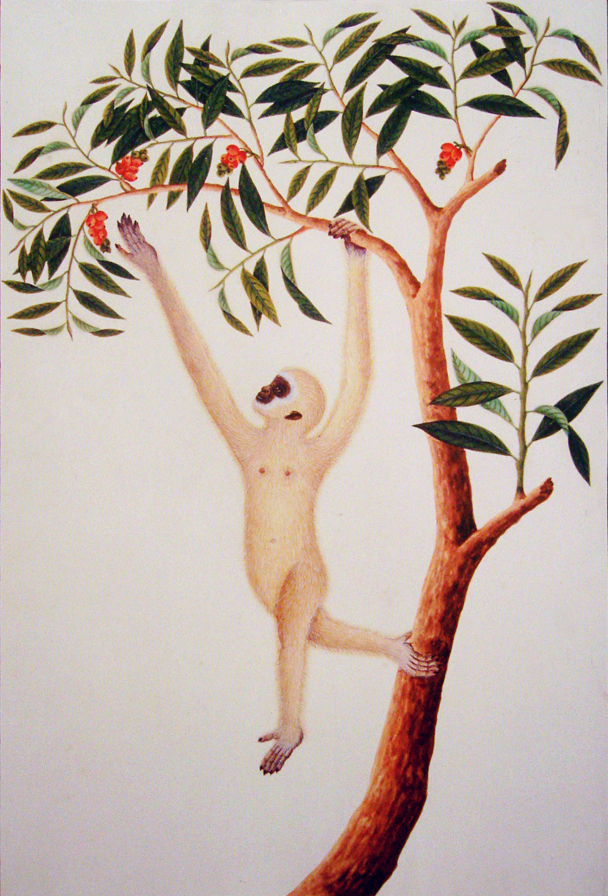
The lar gibbon or white-handed gibbon (Hylobates lar, Malay ungka tangan putih). The tree may be a bignay (also known as the bugnay, bignai or currant tree, Antidesma bunius), or it may simply be from the artist's imagination.

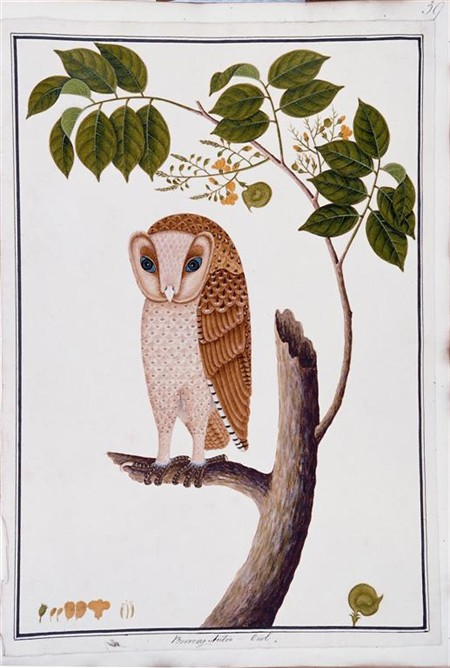
An Oriental bay owl (Phodilus badius; Malay burung hantu ("ghost bird")), perched on an angsana tree (Pterocarpus indicus). The illustration of the owl is highly idealized, as each feather is shown in place and separated from the others.

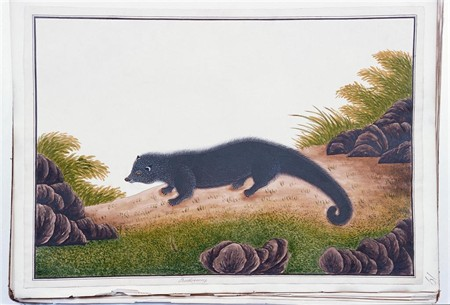
The binturong or Asian bearcat (Arctictis binturong).

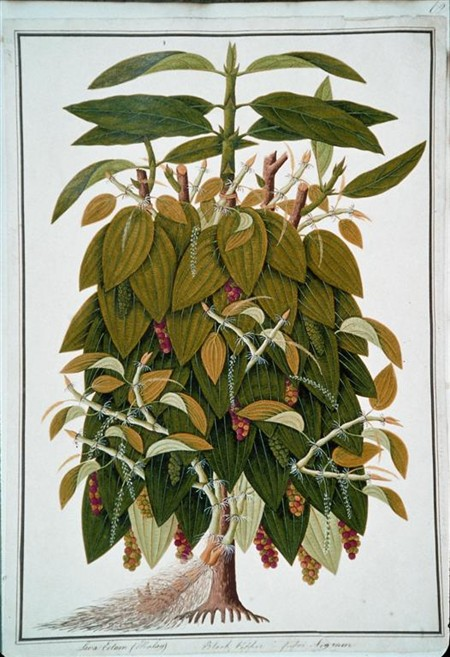
The black pepper (Piper nigrum, Malay lada hitam).

== See also ==
- Singapore History Gallery

== Notes ==
- List of Drawings from the William Farquhar Collection Natural History Drawings from the National Heritage Board's online collections
- Description of Natural History Drawings by William Farquhar from Antiques of Orient
