= Straits of Johor =

Tidal strait in Southeast Asia

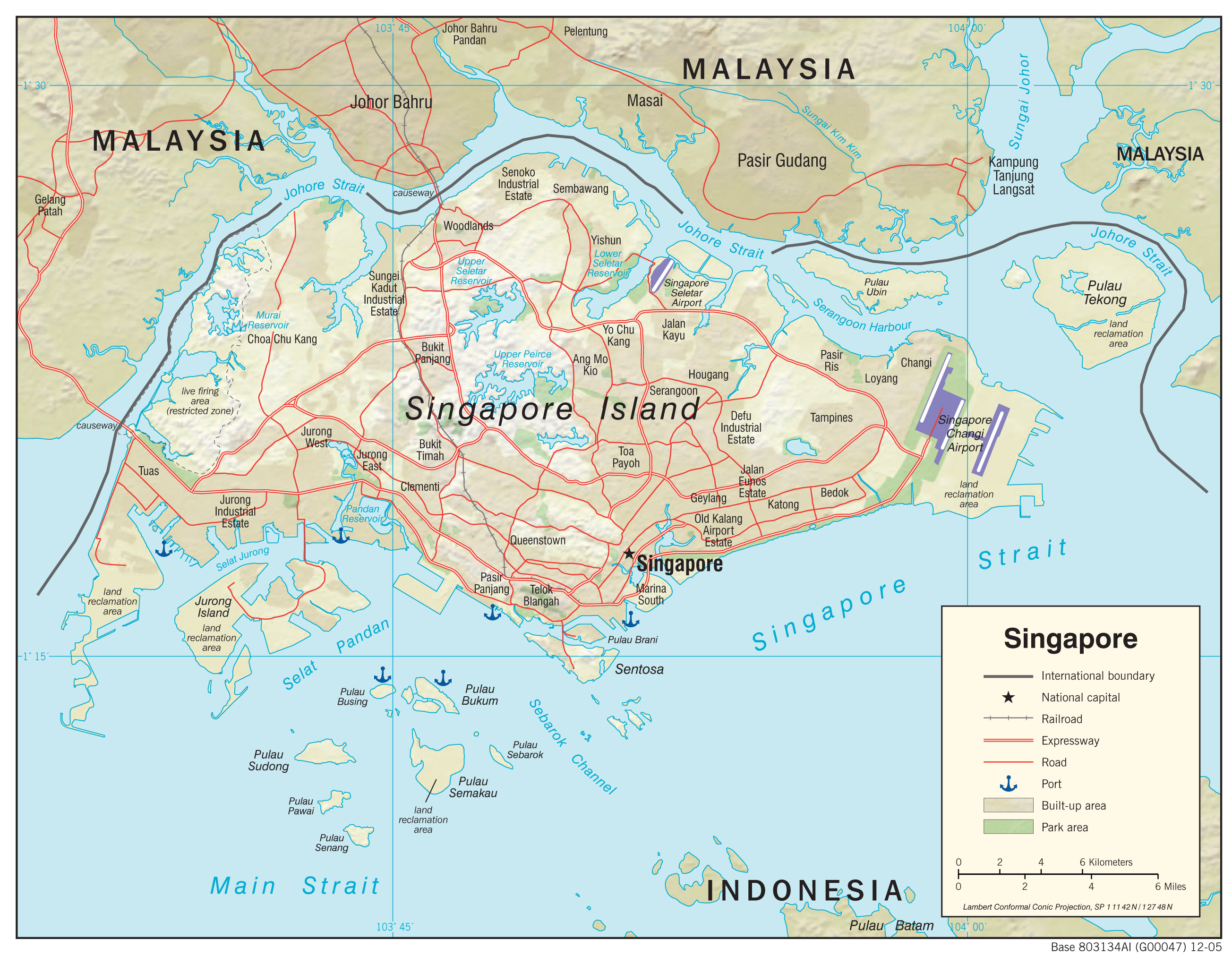
- The strait is located between Malaysia and Singapore
- Interactive map of Straits of Johor
- Coordinates: 1°26′48″N 103°45′13″E
- Type: Strait
- Part of: Malacca Straits
- Basin countries: Malaysia; Singapore
- Max. length: 50 km (31 mi)
- Max. width: 1.6 km (0.99 mi)
- Average depth: 12 m (39 ft)
- Max. depth: 40 m (130 ft) between Sarimbun Rocks and Horseshoe Reef
- Islands: Pulau Merambong; Pulau Ubin; Pulau Serangoon; Pulau Seletar; Pulau Sekudu; Pulau Buloh; Pulau Sarimbun; Pulau Ketam (Singapore); Pulau Khatib Bongsu; Pulau Malang Siajar; Pulau Unum; Pulau Damien; Pulau Pergam
- Settlements: Iskandar Puteri; Johor Bahru; Pasir Gudang; Woodlands; Sembawang; Punggol; Pasir Ris

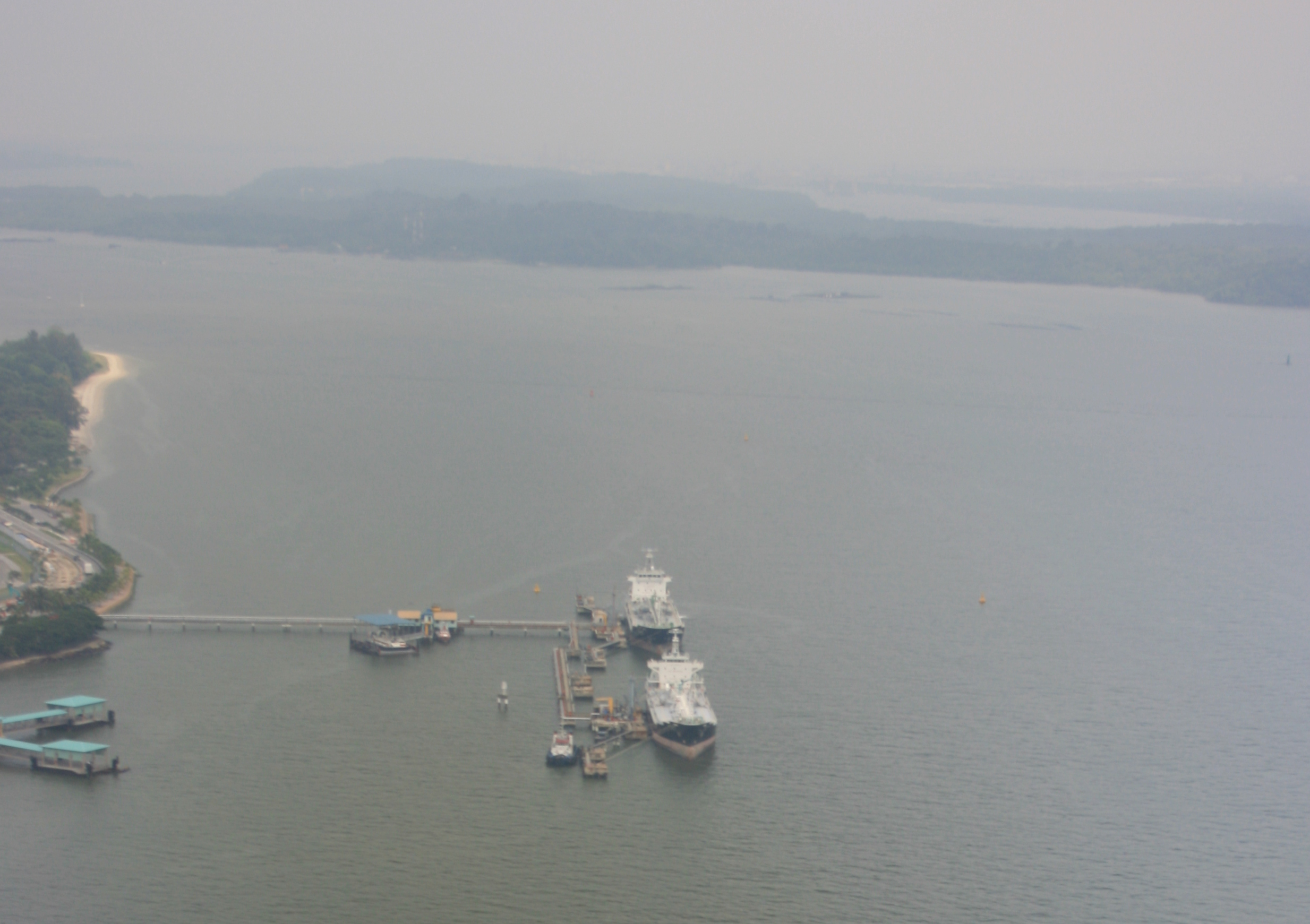
Eastern entrance to the Strait, aerial view with Singapore Island (left) & Pulau Ubin (background).

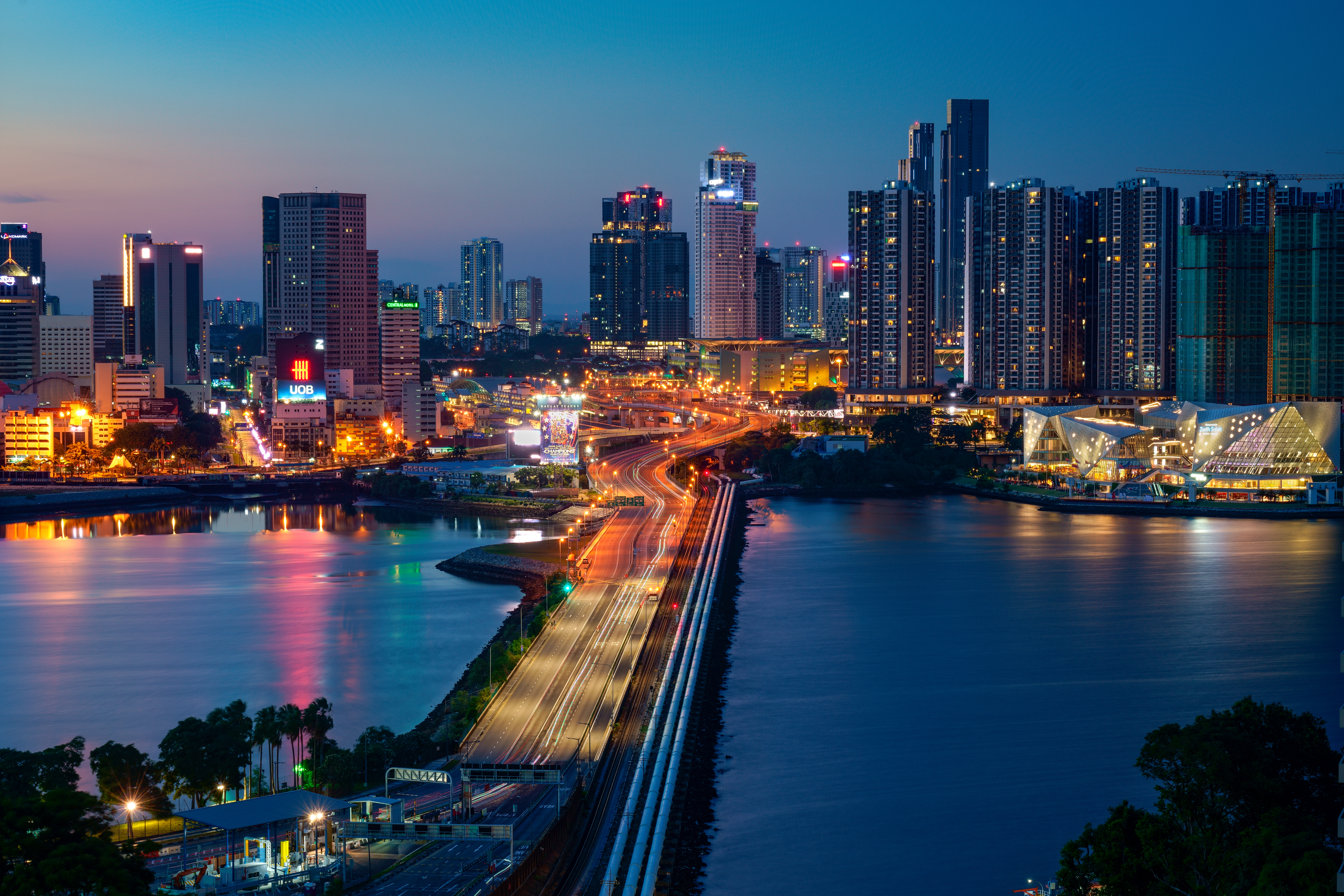
Johor–Singapore Causeway spanning the Strait, viewed from Woodlands Checkpoint in Singapore.

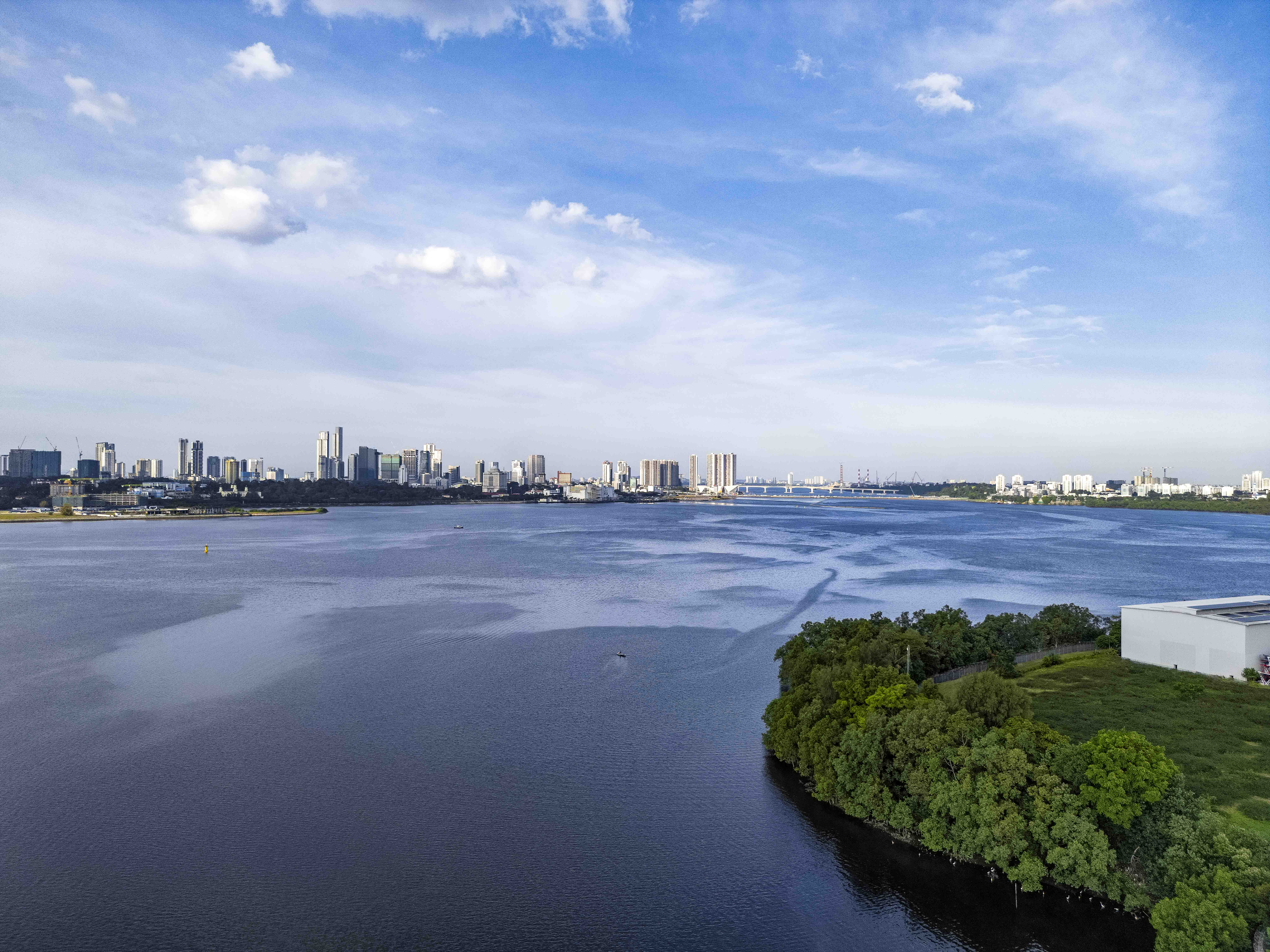
Aerial view of the Straits of Johor from Singapore with a view of the Johor-Singapore Causeway

The Straits of Johor (also known as the Tebrau Strait, Johor Strait, Selat Johor, Selat Tebrau, and Tebrau Reach, also spelled Johore Strait) is an international tidal strait in Southeast Asia, between Singapore and Peninsular Malaysia.

== Geography ==
The straits separate the Malaysian state of Johor on the mainland Malay Peninsula to the north, from Singapore and its islands to the south. It connects to the Strait of Malacca to the west, and the Singapore Strait to the southeast and can therefore be called an Estuary.

The mouth and delta of the Johor River is on its northeast side in Malaysia.

=== Crossings ===
There are currently two bridges crossing the straits. The Johor–Singapore Causeway, known simply as "The Causeway", links Johor Bahru and Woodlands in Singapore. The Malaysia–Singapore Second Link bridge is further west, and links Iskandar Puteri in Malaysia and Tuas in Singapore.

In 2003, Malaysia wanted to build a bridge across the straits to replace the existing causeway, but negotiations with Singapore were not successful. The main reasons cited for the change were:

1. a bridge would allow free flow of water across both sides of the straits, whereas the causeway artificially cuts the straits in two (this would allow ships to bypass the port of Singapore).
2. a bridge would help ease congestion in Johor Bahru.

In August 2003, Malaysia announced that it was going ahead with a plan to build a gently sloping, curved bridge that would join up with Singapore's half of the existing causeway. The plans included a swing bridge for the railway line. However, plans to build the bridge were called off by Malaysia as of 2006 after Singapore said it was amenable to the bridge if the negotiations include other bilateral matters such as the use of Malaysian airspace by Singapore's air force and the buying of water and sand resources from Malaysia. Malaysia viewed Singapore's proposal as a compromise on its sovereignty.

Other proposed crossings include Johor Bahru–Singapore Rapid Transit System and Kuala Lumpur–Singapore high-speed rail. Both of which would have started construction in 2019 but have since been delayed due to the change of political administration in Malaysia in 2018 and the ongoing efforts to reduce national debts incurred previously under Najib Razak's administration.

=== Tributaries ===
Major tributaries which empty into the Strait of Johore estuary include:

- Johor River
- Pelentong River
- Pulai River
- Segget River
- Tebrau River
- Sungai Sengkuang
- Sungai Haji Rahmat
- Sungai Kempas
- Sungai Sri Buntan
- Sungai Abd Samad
- Sungai Air Molek
- Sungai Stulang
- Sungai Setanggong
- Sungai Tampoi
- Sungai Sebulong
- Sungai Bala
- Sungai Pandan
- Sungai Tengkorak
- Sungai Senibong

In the Malay language, Sungai is the word for river.

== Ecology ==
Pollution along the Johore Strait is notable.

The area is also a source of environmental contention between Malaysia and Singapore, due to land reclamation projects on both sides of the Causeway. There have been suggestions that the ongoing land reclamation projects may impact the maritime boundary, shipping lanes, and water ecology of the Malaysian side. Environmental Impact Assessments are requested before any reclamation is carried out such as the Forest City project.

Reclamation and redevelopment projects may also endanger the livelihood of indigenous sea nomad communities and the habitat and food source of dugongs, which are native to the strait.

== History ==
The Johore Strait was historically sometimes mislabeled as "Old Strait of Singapore" which today would be around Keppel Harbour, instead of correctly Tebrau Strait. Due to its shallow and dangerous waters it was mainly used by Orang Laut sea people, specifically Orang Seletar and, since the 15th century, hosted Malay kampongs of the Johor Sultanate. Portuguese and later Dutch colonial powers, while generally focused on the "New Strait" (today's Singapore Strait) sometimes tried to block access to the Johore Strait to force trade southwards.

The Johore Strait is the location of two Victoria Cross deeds. The award was for Lieutenant Ian Edward Fraser and Acting Leading Seaman James Joseph Magennis for the sinking of the 9,850-tonne Japanese cruiser Takao on 31 July 1945.

The Johore Strait has considerably changed depth and narrowed over time due to reclamation and construction. It has also accumulated sediment after the construction of the causeway which changed its ecology significantly.

== Places of interest ==
A well known tourist attraction of the Strait of Johore's is Lido Beach, located on the Malaysian side in Johor Bahru.

The Strait of Johor still hosts a few indigenous Orang Seletar sea nomad communities endangered by reclamation and reconstruction projects, for example in Kampungs Sungai Melayu, Sungai Temon or Jawa.
