= Elizabeth Polunin =

English painter (1887-1950)

- Born: Elizabeth Violet Hart; 21 May 1887; Ashford, Kent, England
- Died: 15 June 1950 (aged 63); Edgware, Middlesex, England
- Education: Académie Colarossi; École des Beaux-Arts; Westminster School of Art
- Known for: Theatre design and portrait painting
- Spouse: Vladimir Polunin (m. 1907)
- Children: 4, including: Nicholas Polunin; Oleg Polunin; Ivan Polunin

Elizabeth Violet Polunin (née Hart; 21 May 1887 – 15 June 1950) was a British artist and theatre designer, most notably for her work with Sergei Diaghilev and the Ballets Russes.

== Life and work ==
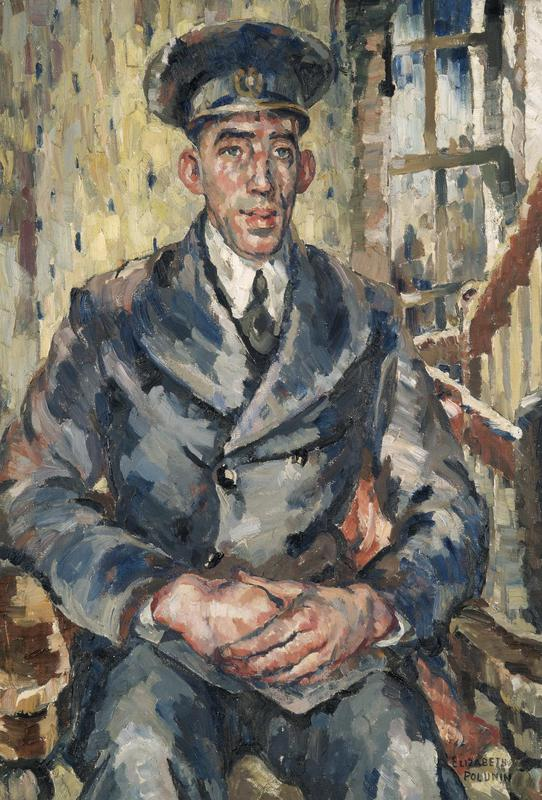
Divisional Officer Twyman (1942) (Art.IWM ART LD 1898)

Polunin was born in Ashford, Kent and when she was aged 17 she went to Paris to study art at the Académie Colarossi under Lucien Simon and at the École des Beaux-Arts. Polunin continued her education at a private art school in Saint Petersburg where she was taught by Léon Bakst before she returned to England, where she studied under Walter Sickert at the Westminster School of Art.

In 1907 Elizabeth Hart married Vladimir Polunin in St. Petersburg. The Polunins moved to London and both worked as scene-painters in several theatres. Most notably they designed and painted sets for Sergei Diaghilev and the Ballets Russes during their regular London seasons and the couple soon became the principal set designers for the company, working with Léon Bakst. Diaghilev commissioned set designs and costumes from artists such as Georges Braque and Pablo Picasso, and they were to have a huge influence on Polunin. She produced portraits of both Diaghilev and the opera singer Feodor Chaliapin. When Picasso spent ten weeks in London during the summer of 1919 to produce designs for the company's production of The Three-Cornered Hat he worked in the Polunin's Floral Street studio in Covent Garden. Polunin also produced designs for Sir Thomas Beecham's Opera Company.

From 1924 onwards Elizabeth Polunin concentrated on portrait and landscape painting and exhibited at a series of solo shows in London, beginning in 1925. In 1933 Polunin returned to the theatre to design scenery and costumes for The Snow Maiden at Sadler's Wells. The Victoria and Albert Museum would later acquire some of her costume designs for its collection. Between 1924 and 1941 Polunin was a regular exhibitor at the Royal Academy.

During the Second World War, Polunin completed a small number of commissioned paintings for the War Artists' Advisory Committee. As well as her solo exhibitions, Polunin exhibited with the New English Art Club, the London Group and in Paris at the Salon des Independants and the Salon d'Automne.

Elizabeth and Vladimir Polunin had three sons who all became distinguished scientists. Oleg Polunin was an English botanist, teacher and traveller. Nicholas Polunin (1909–1997) was an arctic explorer and environmentalist, Ivan Polunin (1920–2010) was a medical anthropologist, and a daughter Tanya Polunin (1921–2009) who was a piano teacher. A plaque at the site of Polunin's studio in Covent Garden records the time Picasso spent there.

Polunin died in Edgware, Middlesex, England on 15 June 1950.
