= Kampung Pasir Putih =

Village in Malaysia

Kampung Pasir Putih is a village in Pasir Gudang, Johor Bahru District, Johor, Malaysia. This village was established in 1920, along with three other villages, and is the only one that still exists today in Pasir Gudang. The primary sectors that contribute to the economy of this village are agriculture and commerce. Malays, Indonesians and Pakistanis are the main residents of this village (the latter two work in the nearby factory).

Kampung Pasir Putih was administered by the head village named Tuan Suhaimi who lives at Tanjung Puteri Resort, which is located beside Kampung Pasir Putih.

There are two main primary schools at Kampung Pasir Putih: Sekolah Kebangsaan Pasir Putih and Sekolah Agama Kampung Pasir Putih.
