= Scenographer =

Person who develops design elements for production

A scenographer (scenic designer or production designer) is a person who develops the physical appearance of a stage design, TV or movie set, gaming environment, exhibition design, or a museum experience design.

A scenographer works together with the theatre director to bring the conceptual vision of the artistic piece to life, the director most often having the leading role and responsibility particularly for dramatic aspects (such as casting, acting, and direction), and the scenographer primarily responsible for the visual aspects or "look" of the production (which often includes scenery or sets, lighting, costumes, sound, projections, and other design elements).

The term scenography is of Greek origin (skēnē, meaning 'stage or scene building'; grapho, meaning 'to describe') originally detailed within Aristotle's Poetics as 'skenographia'.

Within continental Europe, the term has been closely aligned with the professional practice of scénographie and is synonymous with the English-language term 'theatre design'. In North America, roles of a scenographer are typically shared among several people. The production's design team often includes a director, scenic or set designer, lighting designer, costume designer, sound designer, dramaturg, stage manager, and production manager.

== See also ==
- Scenography
- Set construction
- Show control
- Sound design
