= List of Bas Muafakat Johor bus routes =

List of bus routes funded by the Johor state government

This is a list of the 78 Bas Muafakat Johor bus routes overseen by the Johor Public Transport Corporation (PAJ), under the auspices of the state government of Johor in Malaysia.

== Iskandar Malaysia region ==
=== Johor Bahru ===
A Bas Muafakat Johor P106 bus arriving at from AEON Mall Tebrau City.

Johor Public Transport Corporation oversees the operation of ten bus routes serving Johor Bahru, funded by Johor Bahru City Council. The bus routes are operated by Handal Indah.

Route number	Origin	Destination	Service type	Operator	Notes
P101	Larkin Sentral Bus Terminal		Loop	Handal Indah	
P102	PPR Sri Stulang	JB Sentral Bus Terminal	Bidirectional	Handal Indah	
P103	Larkin Sentral Bus Terminal	Mid Valley Southkey	Bidirectional	Handal Indah	
P104	B5 Street Market		Loop	Handal Indah	
P104-01 (Note: Formally listed by the Johor Public Transport Corporation as P104 (Hybrid))	Damansara Alif		Loop (Supplementary)	Handal Indah	Operates on school days only.
P105	Mid Valley Southkey		Loop	Handal Indah	
P106	Toppen Shopping Centre		Loop	Handal Indah	
P107	Taman Seri Molek Perdana		Loop	Handal Indah	Serves Taman Molek at both directions.
P111	KFC Puteri Wangsa		Loop	Handal Indah	
P112	RTBJ Kempas Utama		Loop	Handal Indah	
P113	Larkin Sentral Bus Terminal	Kempas Bahru KTM Station	Bidirectional	Handal Indah	
P113-01 (Note: Formally listed by the Johor Public Transport Corporation as P113 (Hybrid))	Larkin Sentral Bus Terminal	Larkin Indah	Loop (Supplementary)	Handal Indah	Operates on school days only.

==== Shuttle bus services ====
Johor Public Transport Corporation also oversees the operation of five shuttle bus services in Johor Bahru, also funded by Johor Bahru City Council. The shuttle bus services are operated by Mayang Sari and Handal Indah.

Route number	Origin	Destination	Service type	Operator	Notes
HSA	Larkin Sentral Bus Terminal	Sultanah Aminah Hospital	Loop	Mayang Sari	Operates on weekdays only.
HSA-01 (Note: Formally listed by the Johor Public Transport Corporation as HSA - TROPICANA)	Tropicana Lido	Sultanah Aminah Hospital	Loop	Mayang Sari	Operates on weekdays only.
HSI	Tebrau (Lotus's branch)	Sultan Ismail Hospital	Loop	Mayang Sari	Operates on weekdays only.
Zoo	Kota Jail	Johor Zoo	Bidirectional	Handal Indah	
KHAS (Note: Formally listed by the Johor Public Transport Corporation as Shuttle Khas)	AEON Mall Bandar Dato' Onn	KTM Kempas Baru station	Bidirectional	Handal Indah	

=== Iskandar Puteri ===
Johor Public Transport Corporation oversees the operation of five bus routes serving Iskandar Puteri, funded by Iskandar Puteri City Council. The bus routes are operated by Handal Indah.

Route number	Origin	Destination	Service type	Operator	Notes
P201	Taman Universiti Bus Terminal	Taman Pulai Mutiara	Loop	Handal Indah	
P203	PPR Melana	KIP Mall Tampoi	Bidirectional	Handal Indah	Serves Taman Selesa Jaya in both directions.
P211	Taman Universiti Bus Terminal	Larkin Sentral Bus Terminal	Bidirectional	Handal Indah	Serves University of Technology Malaysia in both directions.
P215	Taman Pulai Mutiara	Sunway Big Box	Bidirectional	Handal Indah	Serves Gelang Patah Bus Terminal in both directions.
P216	Taman Selesa Jaya	Sunway Big Box	Bidirectional	Handal Indah	

==== Shuttle bus services ====
Johor Public Transport Corporation also oversees the operation of two shuttle bus services in Iskandar Puteri, also funded by Iskandar Puteri City Council. The shuttle bus services are operated by Handal Indah.

Route number	Origin	Destination	Service type	Operator	Notes
JDT	Hutan Bandar MBIP	Sultan Ibrahim Stadium	Bidirectional	Handal Indah	Operates on match dates only.
JDT-01	Sireh Park	Sultan Ibrahim Stadium	Bidirectional	Handal Indah	Operates on match dates only.

=== Pasir Gudang ===
Johor Public Transport Corporation oversees the operation of eight bus routes serving Pasir Gudang, funded by Pasir Gudang City Council. The bus routes are operated by Handal Indah.

Route number	Origin	Destination	Service type	Operator	Notes
P302	Desa Rakyat	Pasir Gudang Bus Terminal	Bidirectional	Handal Indah	
P302-01 (Note: Formally listed by the Johor Public Transport Corporation as P302 (Hybrid))	Taman Cendana	Pasir Gudang Bus Terminal	Unidirectional	Handal Indah	
P303	Kota Masai Bus Terminal	Pasir Gudang Bus Terminal	Bidirectional	Handal Indah	Two special trips departing from Pasir Gudang Bus Terminal are also performed, terminating at KTM Pasir Gudang station instead.
P303-01 (Note: Formally listed by the Johor Public Transport Corporation as P303 (Hybrid))	Kampung Tanjung Langsat	Tanjung Puteri	Bidirectional	Handal Indah	
P311	Pasir Gudang Bus Terminal	JB Sentral Bus Terminal	Bidirectional	Handal Indah	
P312	Masai Bus Terminal	Pasir Gudang Bus Terminal	Loop	Handal Indah	
P312-01 (Note: Formally listed by the Johor Public Transport Corporation as P312 (Hybrid))	Pasir Gudang Bus Terminal	Taman Air Biru	Loop	Handal Indah	
P314	Kampung Kong Kong	Pasir Gudang Bus Terminal	Bidirectional	Handal Indah	

=== Kulai ===
Johor Public Transport Corporation oversees the operation of six bus routes serving Kulai, funded by Kulai Municipal Council. The bus routes are operated by Handal Indah.

Route number	Origin	Destination	Service type	Operator	Notes
P401	Kulai Bus Terminal	Bandar Putra Kulai	Loop	Handal Indah	
P402	Econsave (Senai branch)		Loop	Handal Indah	
P403	Kulai Bus Terminal	Felda Inas	Bidirectional	Handal Indah	
P403-01 (Note: Formally listed by the Johor Public Transport Corporation as P403 (Hybrid))	Felda Inas	Bandar Tenggara	Loop (Supplementary)	Handal Indah	Operates on school days only.
P411	Kulai Bus Terminal		Loop	Handal Indah	
P412	Kulai Bus Terminal	Taman Scientex Kulai (Kelapa Sawit)	Loop	Handal Indah	

== Other regions of Johor ==
=== Batu Pahat ===
Johor Public Transport Corporation oversees the operation of two bus routes serving Batu Pahat, funded by Batu Pahat Municipal Council. The bus routes are operated by Mayang Sari.

Route number	Origin	Destination	Service type	Operator	Notes
BP001	Batu Pahat Bus Terminal	Hospital Sultanah Nora Ismail	Loop	Mayang Sari	
BP002	Batu Pahat Bus Terminal	Pasar Parit Raja	Bidirectional	Mayang Sari	

=== Kluang ===
Johor Public Transport Corporation oversees the operation of four bus routes serving Kluang, funded by Kluang Municipal Council. The bus routes are operated by Kembara City and Mayang Sari.

Route number	Origin	Destination	Service type	Operator	Notes
KL001	Kluang Bus Terminal	Taman Desa	Loop	Kembara City	
KL002	Kluang Bus Terminal	Enche' Besar Hajjah Khalsom Hospital	Loop	Kembara City	
KL003	Kluang Bus Terminal	Pekan Kahang	Bidirectional	Mayang Sari	
KL004	Paloh Bus Station	Kluang Bus Terminal	Bidirectional	Mayang Sari	

=== Kota Tinggi ===
Johor Public Transport Corporation oversees the operation of three bus routes serving Kota Tinggi, funded by Kota Tinggi District Council. The bus routes are operated by Mayang Sari.

Route number	Origin	Destination	Service type	Operator	Notes
KT001	Kota Tinggi Bus Terminal	Pejabat Kesihatan	Loop	Mayang Sari	
KT002	Kota Tinggi Bus Terminal	Taman Sri Saujana	Loop	Mayang Sari	
KT003	Kota Tinggi Bus Terminal	Kampung Sedili Kechil	Bidirectional	Mayang Sari	

=== Labis ===
Johor Public Transport Corporation oversees the operation of two bus routes serving Labis, funded by Labis District Council. The bus routes are operated by Yow Hoe Bus.

Route number	Origin	Destination	Service type	Operator	Notes
LB001	Labis Bus Terminal	Klinik Kesihatan Air Panas	Loop	Yow Hoe Bus	
LB003	Labis Bus Terminal	Pekan Chaah	Loop	Yow Hoe Bus	

=== Mersing ===
Johor Public Transport Corporation oversees the operation of five bus routes serving Mersing, funded by Mersing District Council. The bus routes are operated by Handal Indah.

Route number	Origin	Destination	Service type	Operator	Notes
ME001	Mersing Bus Terminal	Kampung Seri Pantai	Loop	Handal Indah	
ME002	Mersing Bus Terminal	Kampung Air Papan	Bidirectional	Handal Indah	
ME003	Kampung Penyabong	Endau Bus Station	Bidirectional	Handal Indah	
ME003-01 (Note: Formally listed by the Johor Public Transport Corporation as ME003 (Hybrid))	Tanjung Resang	Kampung Penyabong	Unidirectional	Handal Indah	
ME004	Mersing Bus Terminal	Endau Bus Station	Bidirectional	Handal Indah	

=== Muar ===
Johor Public Transport Corporation oversees the operation of six bus routes serving Muar, funded by Muar Municipal Council. The bus routes are operated by Mayang Sari.

Route number	Origin	Destination	Service type	Operator	Notes
MU001	Muar - Maharani Bus Terminal	SK Sungai Abong	Loop	Mayang Sari	
MU002	Muar - Maharani Bus Terminal	Muar Stadium	Loop	Mayang Sari	
MU003	Muar - Maharani Bus Terminal	Pasar Awam Bukit Bakri	Loop	Mayang Sari	
MU004	Muar - Maharani Bus Terminal	Pagoh	Bidirectional	Mayang Sari	Operates on weekdays only.
MU004-01 (Note: Formally listed by the Johor Public Transport Corporation as MU004 (Hybrid))	Muar - Maharani Bus Terminal	Pagoh	Bidirectional	Mayang Sari	Operates on weekends only.
MU005	Muar - Maharani Bus Terminal	Jorak (Bukit Pasir)	Bidirectional	Mayang Sari	

=== Pengerang ===
Johor Public Transport Corporation oversees the operation of four bus routes serving Pengerang, funded by Pengerang Municipal Council. The bus routes are operated by Handal Indah.

Route number	Origin	Destination	Service type	Operator	Notes
PE001	Bandar Penawar Bus Terminal	Desaru Coast Ferry Terminal	Loop	Handal Indah	
PE002	Sungai Rengit Bus Terminal	Taman Bayu Damai	Loop	Handal Indah	
PE004	Bandar Penawar Bus Terminal	Kota Tinggi Bus Terminal	Bidirectional	Handal Indah	
PE005	Bandar Penawar Bus Terminal	Taman Bayu Damai	Bidirectional	Handal Indah	

=== Pontian ===
Johor Public Transport Corporation oversees the operation of three bus routes serving Pontian, funded by Pontian Municipal Council. The bus routes are operated by Kembara City.

Route number	Origin	Destination	Service type	Operator	Notes
PN001	Pontian Bus Terminal	Parit Selangor	Loop	Kembara City	
PN001-01	Pontian Bus Terminal	Parit Selangor	Loop	Kembara City	
PN002	Pekan Nanas (Maybank branch)	Kampung Seri Gunung Pulai	Loop	Kembara City	
PN003	Pontian Bus Terminal	Kukup Bus Terminal	Bidirectional	Kembara City	

=== Segamat ===
Johor Public Transport Corporation oversees the operation of three bus routes serving Segamat, funded by Segamat Municipal Council. The bus routes are operated by Yow Hoe Bus and Mayang Sari.

Route number	Origin	Destination	Service type	Operator	Notes
SE001	Segamat Bus Terminal	Bukit Siput	Loop	Mayang Sari	
SE002	Segamat Bus Terminal	Buloh Kasap	Loop	Yow Hoe Bus	
SE003	Segamat Bus Terminal	Universiti Teknologi MARA (Segamat campus)	Loop	Yow Hoe Bus	

=== Simpang Renggam ===
Johor Public Transport Corporation oversees the operation of five bus routes serving Simpang Renggam, funded by Simpang Renggam District Council. The bus routes are operated by Kembara City and Transit Link (Johor Bahru).

Route number	Origin	Destination	Service type	Operator	Notes
SR001	Simpang Renggam Bus Terminal	SMK Simpang Renggam	Loop	Kembara City	
SR001A	Simpang Renggam Bus Terminal	SMK Simpang Renggam	Loop	Kembara City	
SR002	Simpang Renggam Bus Terminal	Layang-Layang (Maybank branch)	Bidirectional	Transit Link (Johor Bahru)	
SR003	Simpang Renggam Bus Terminal	Renggam Bus Terminal (KTM Rengam station)	Bidirectional	Kembara City	
SR004	Renggam Bus Terminal (KTM Rengam station)	Kluang Bus Terminal	Bidirectional	Transit Link (Johor Bahru)	

=== Tangkak ===
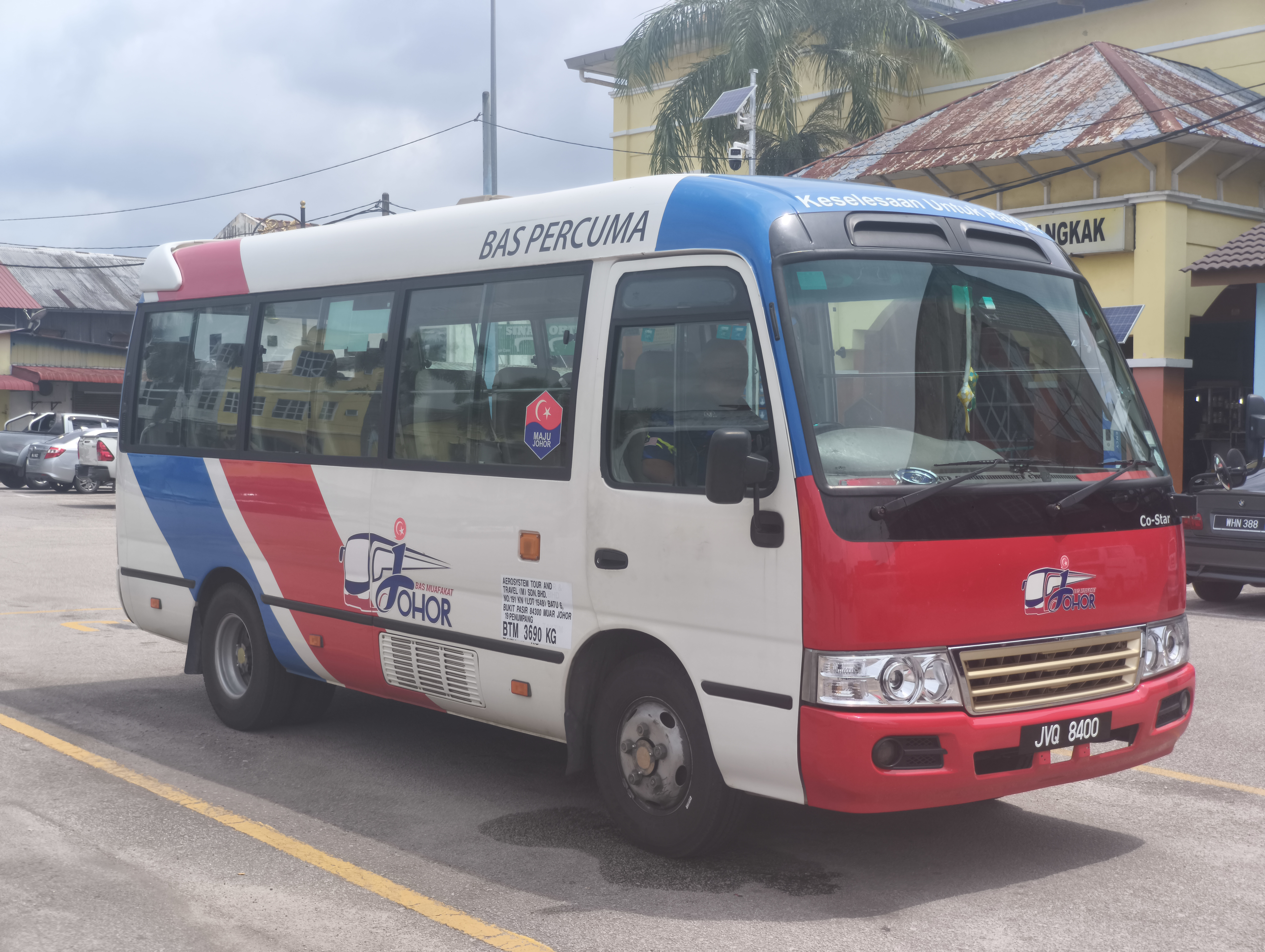
The TK001 route uses a coaster for easier routing through the residential garden of Tangkak town.

Johor Public Transport Corporation oversees the operation of three bus routes serving Tangkak, funded by Tangkak District Council. The bus routes are operated by Mayang Sari.

Route number	Origin	Destination	Service type	Operator	Notes
TK001	Tangkak Bus Terminal	Tangkak Hospital	Loop	Mayang Sari	
TK002	Muar - Maharani Bus Terminal	Pagoh	Bidirectional	Mayang Sari	
TK003	Tangkak Bus Terminal	Pekan Sagil	Bidirectional	Mayang Sari	

=== Yong Peng ===
Johor Public Transport Corporation oversees the operation of two bus routes serving Yong Peng, funded by Yong Peng District Council. The bus routes are operated by Mayang Sari.

Route number	Origin	Destination	Service type	Operator	Notes
YP001	Yong Peng Bus Terminal	Lucky Garden	Loop	Mayang Sari	
YP002	Yong Peng Bus Terminal	Kangkar Baru	Bidirectional	Mayang Sari	

== See also ==
- List of bus routes in Johor Bahru
- Bus transport in Malaysia
