= Johor State Route J10 =

Road in Malaysia

Johor Route 10

Major junctions
- West end: Tebrau Highway; NSK Hypermarket Pandan
- FT 3 (Tebrau Highway) / AH18; FT 17 Pasir Gudang Highway
- East end: Kong Kong

Location
- Country: Malaysia
- Primary destinations: Johor Bahru, Taman Molek, Taman Johor Jaya, Plentong, Permas Jaya, Bandar Sri Alam, Masai, Pasir Gudang, Kota Masai

Highway system
- Highways in Malaysia; Expressways; Federal; State

Jalan Masai Lama, Johor State Route J10 is a major road in Johor, Malaysia. It is also a main route to Plentong, Masai, Pasir Gudang and Kong Kong.

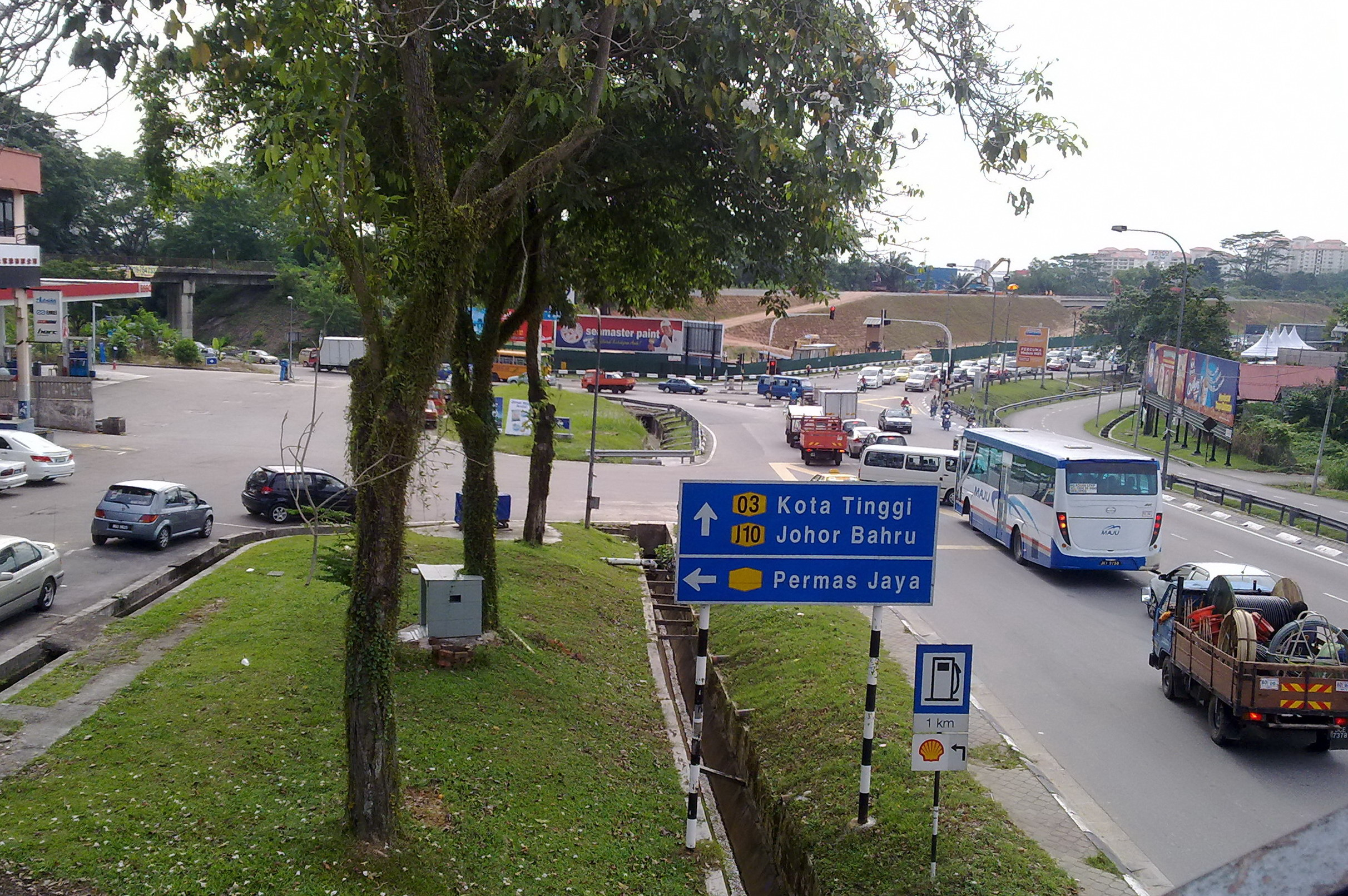
Jalan Masai Lama in Plentong

== Junction lists ==
The entire route is located in Johor Bahru District, Johor.

Legend:

- I/C - Interchange, I/S - Intersection, RSA - Rest and service area, OBR - Overhead bridge restaurant, R/R - Restaurant and rest plaza, L/B - Layby, V/P - Vista point, TN - tunnel, T/P - Toll plaza, BR - Bridge
- C - Cloverleaf, S - Stack, T-A - Trumpet-A, T-B - Trumpet-B, DT - Directional-T/Y, SDT - Semi-Directional-T/Y, P-Y - Partial-Y, D - Diamond, P-C - Partial cloverleaf, D-D - Diverging diamond, D-R - Direct ramp

Location	km	mi	Name	Destinations	Notes	
Taman Molek	0.0	0.0	Tebrau Highway; NSK Trade City Hypermarket Tebrau	FT 3 (Tebrau Highway) / AH18 – Mersing, Kota Tinggi, Kota Tinggi waterfall, Desaru, Tampoi, Skudai, Senai, Kulai, Bandar Sri Alam, Pasir Gudang, Johor Port, Tanjung Langsat, Johor Bahru, Woodlands (Singapore) Second Link Expressway / AH143 – Tuas (Singapore); North–South Expressway Southern Route / AH2 – Kuala Lumpur, Malacca	Half-diamond interchange	
Taman Molek			Taman Molek	Jalan Molek 1 – Molek Pine	T-junctions	
Taman Molek			Taman Johor Jaya	Jalan Rosmerah 1/1 – Kawasan Perindustian Johor Jaya	LILO Junctions	
Taman Molek			Taman Molek	Jalan Rosmerah Utama - Taman Johor Jaya; Persiaran Molek Utama – Taman Redang, Johor Bahru, Ponderosa Golf and Country Club	Junctions	
		Daiman 18 Golf and Country Club		T-junctions		
		Prima Regency Apartment		T-junctions		
Plentong			Plentong	Jalan Masai Jaya - Lotus's Plentong, Vila Seni, Parc Regency	T-junctions	
Plentong			Pasir Gudang Highway	FT 17 Pasir Gudang Highway – Mersing, Kota Tinggi, Kota Tinggi waterfall, Desaru, Tampoi, Skudai, Senai, Kulai, Bandar Sri Alam, Pasir Gudang, Johor Port, Tanjung Langsat Second Link Expressway / AH143 – Tuas (Singapore); North–South Expressway Southern Route / AH2 – Kuala Lumpur, Malacca	Diamond interchange	
Plentong			Giant Hypermarket Plentong	Giant Hypermarket Plentong		
Plentong			Plentong; Giant Hypermarket Plentong	Jalan Johor Jaya – Taman Johor Jaya, Desa Tebrau, Kota Tinggi, Mersing, Kota Tinggi waterfall, Desaru	T-junctions	
Plentong			Sungai Plentong bridge			
Plentong	Permas Jaya			Permas Jaya	Jalan Permas Utara – Permas Jaya; Johor Bahru Eastern Dispersal Link Expressway / AH2 – Johor Bahru, Woodlands (Singapore)	T-junctions
MBJB-MBPG			Railway bridge			
Bandar Sri Alam			Bandar Sri Alam			
Masai			Masai			
Pasir Gudang			Pair Gudang West	Persiaran Dahlia 2 – Pasir Gudang, Taman Mawar	T-junctions	
Pasir Gudang			Pasir Gudang Central; Taman Cendana	Jalan Masjid – Pasir Gudang, Taman Cendana, Johor Circuit, Masjid Jamek Pasir Gudang, Pasir Gudang Recreational Park, Bukit Layang Layang, Muzium Layang Layang	T-junctions	
Pasir Gudang			Taman Scientex	Taman Scientex – Cahaya Baru	T-junctions	
Pasir Gudang			Pasir Gudang East; Taman Cendana	Taman Cendana	T-junctions	
Kota Masai			Kota Masai			
Kota Masai			Kota Masai	Jalan Kota Masai – Tanjung Langsat, Port of Tanjung Langsat	T-junctions	
Kota Masai			Politeknik Johor Bahru		T-junctions	
Kota Masai			Taman Scientex	Taman Scientex	T-junctions	
Kota Masai			Jalan Takungan Air Sultan Iskandar	Jalan Takungan Air Sultan Siandar – Sultan Iskandar Reservoir, Petronas Natural Gas Operation Centre	T-junctions	
Cahaya Baru			Kampung Cahaya Baru			
Cahaya Baru			Cahaya Baru Estate			
Cahaya Baru			Cahaya Baru-SDE	Senai–Desaru Expressway – Senai, Senai International Airport, Singapore, Kuala Lumpur, Johor Bahru, Ulu Tiram, Desaru, Bandar Penawar, Pengerang	T-junctions	
Kong Kong			Kong Kong Estate			
Kong Kong			Kong Kong		Start/end of road	
1.000 mi = 1.609 km; 1.000 km = 0.621 mi
