= Pasir Gudang City Council =

Local govt. authority in Pasir Gudang, Malaysia.

Pasir Gudang City Council Majlis Bandaraya Pasir Gudang
- Local Government Act 1976
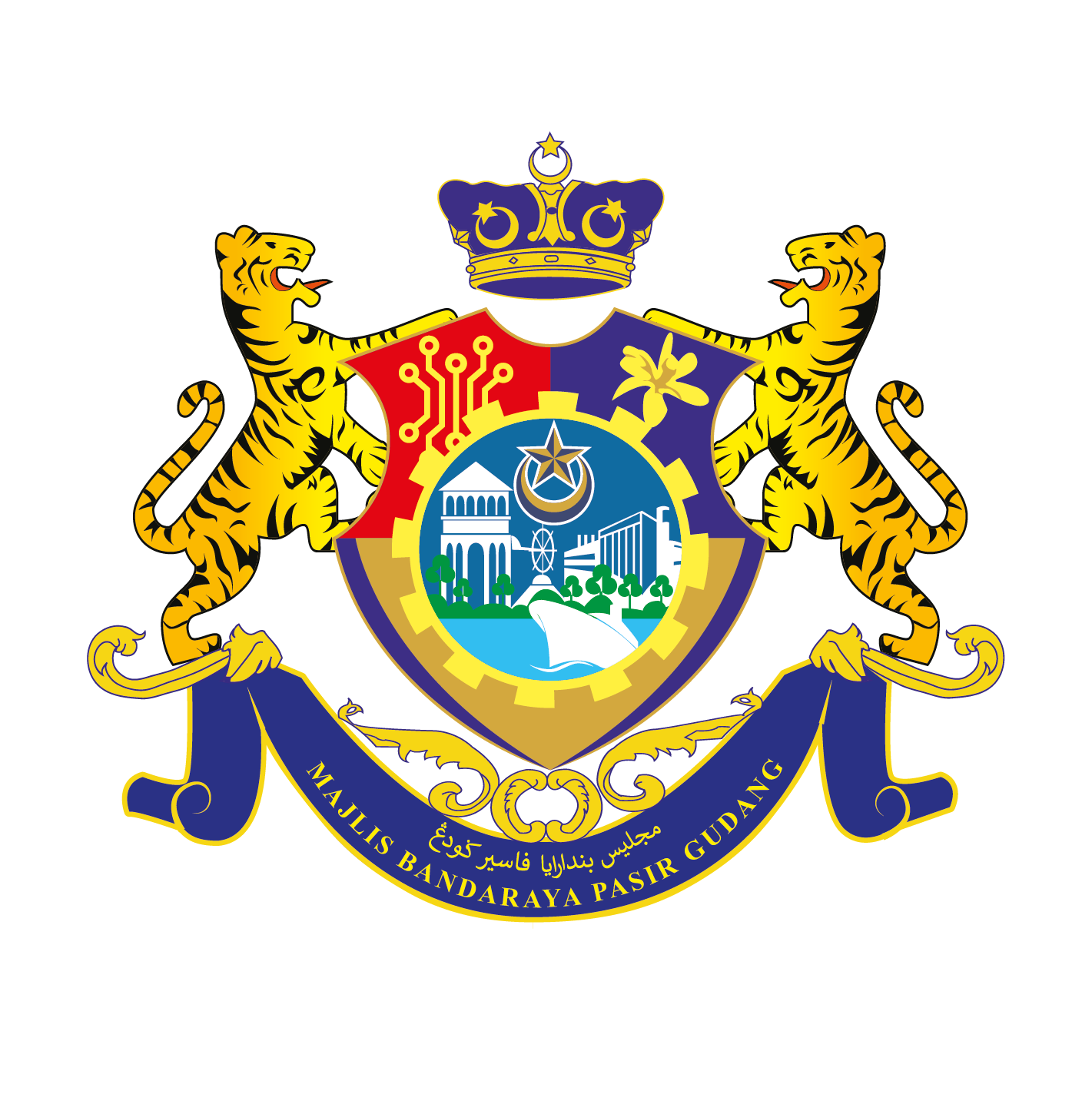
- Emblem

Type
- Type: Local authority of Pasir Gudang

History
- Founded: 22 November 2020; 5 years ago
- Preceded by: Pasir Gudang Local Authority; Pasir Gudang Municipal Council

Leadership
- Mayor: Hazlina Jalil (since 17 October 2025, First Female Mayor)
- Secretary: Ezlan Farid Mohd Said

Structure
- Seats: 24
- Political groups: Councillors: BN (24): UMNO (14); MCA (8); MIC (2)
- Length of term: 1 April 2024–31 December 2025

Motto
- Gemilang, Lestari, Sejahtera (Glorious, Sustainable, Prosperous)

Meeting place
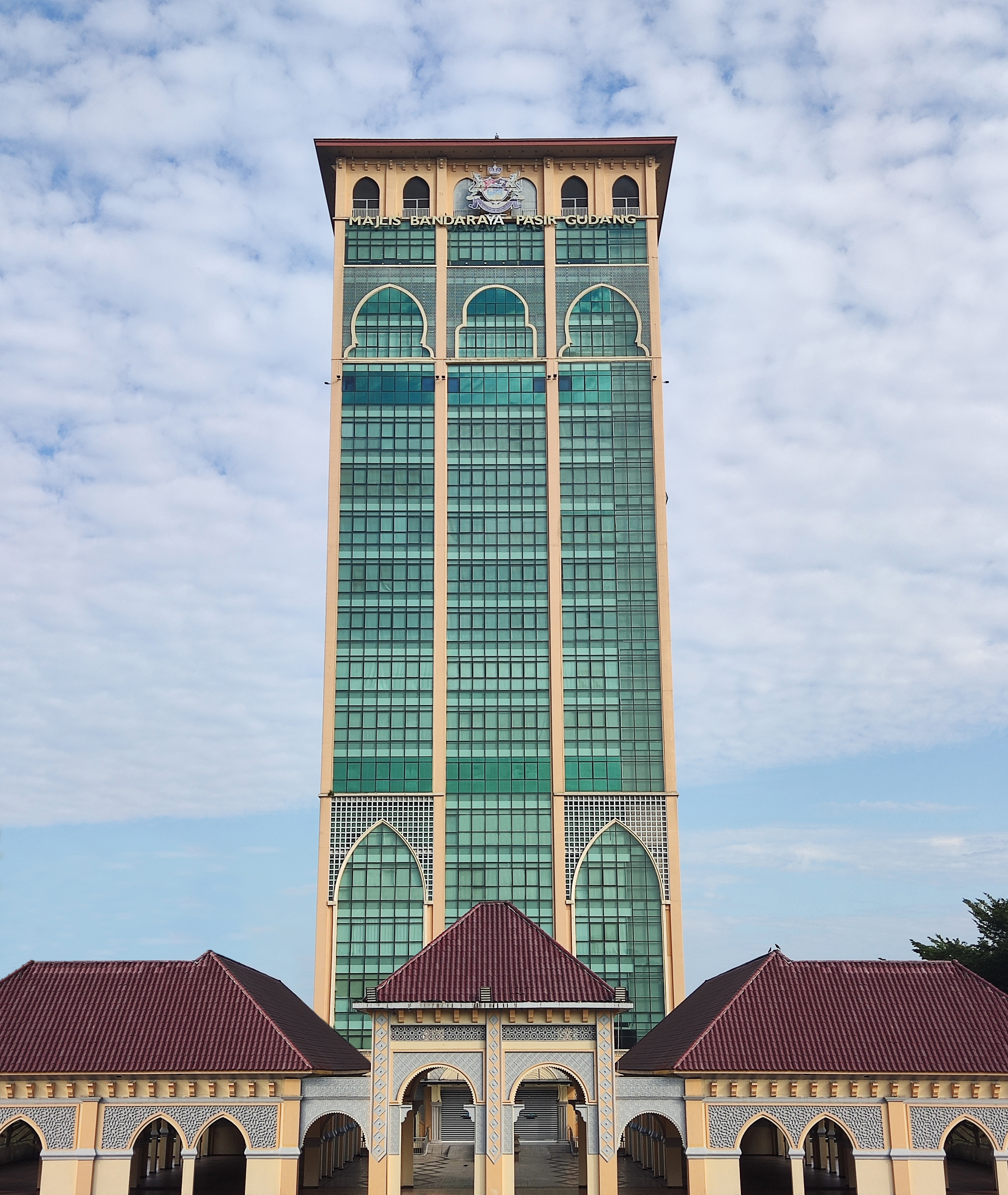
- Aqabah Tower, Pasir Gudang

Website
- mbpg.gov.my

The Pasir Gudang City Council (MBPG; Malay: Majlis Bandaraya Pasir Gudang) is the city council which administrates Pasir Gudang in Johor Bahru District, Johor, Malaysia. This agency is under Johor state government. MBPG is responsible for public health and sanitation, waste removal and management, town planning, environmental protection and building control, social and economic development and general maintenance functions of urban infrastructure. The MBPG main headquarters is located at Aqabah Tower in Pasir Gudang City Centre.

== History ==
=== Pasir Gudang Local Authority ===
The history of Pasir Gudang City Council began on 1 July 1977, when Pasir Gudang Local Authority (Malay: Pihak Berkuasa Tempatan Pasir Gudang, PBTPG) a subsidiary of Johor Corporation (JCorp) was established. It was the first private local authority in Malaysia, although Johor Corporation is the investment arm of the Johor State Government, who entrusted the former to govern the local authority area for 31 years. The Local Authority's president was simultaneously Johor Corporation's own president. Its jurisdiction area mainly consist of Sungai Tiram Mukim and the eastern portion of Plentong Mukim.

From 1 July 1985, the State Government administer the Local Authority under Section 7 of the Local Government Act 1976, replacing the usage of Town Council Enactment 1937 (No. 118). In the beginning, the Pasir Gudang Local Authority operated from a shoplot in the town centre, before moving to the larger Pasir Gudang Town Centre Complex on 12 April 1986.

=== Pasir Gudang Municipal Council ===
This agency was granted municipal status on 1 July 2008 and named Pasir Gudang Municipal Council (MPPG; Malay: Majlis Perbandaran Pasir Gudang). During the transition to direct state government rule on 1 September 2009, two Johor Corporation officers were appointed as president and Secretary respectively, after which they were replaced by state civil servants entirely. 24 councilors were also appointed to represent the 24 zones of the municipality and to act as mediators between residents and the city council.

On 1 July 2010, the municipal council was officiated by then Menteri Besar of Johor Datuk Abdul Ghani Othman. Its new logo, anthem and flag, as well as its 20-storey tall new headquarters – the Aqabah Tower (itself an extension of the Pasir Gudang Town Centre Complex) were also launched on that day. The flag consisted of vertical bands of blue, red, gold and white, with the municipal council's logo in the centre.

The municipal council's non profit charity arm the Pasir Gudang Foundation (Malay: Yayasan Pasir Gudang) was corporatised on 3 October 2013 under the Trustee Act 1952 (Incorporation) and established by Mohamed Khaled Nordin to assist the poor, the disabled and the needy communities. It is headquartered at UTC Pasir Gudang, located behind the municipal council's headquarters the Aqabah Tower.

On 1 January 2016, the administration area of Pasir Gudang Municipal Council was increased from 29,459.9ha to 31,732.24ha, with the re-delineation exercise decided upon by a Johor State Government meeting on 2 July 2014 came into effect. This made Masai and Bandar Seri Alam (both of which ceded from Johor Bahru Tengah), and Taman Rinting and Sierra Perdana (ceded from Johor Bahru City) became a part of the Pasir Gudang Municipality.

=== Pasir Gudang City Council ===
On 22 November 2020, the municipal council was upgraded to the Pasir Gudang City Council (MBPG; Malay: Majlis Bandaraya Pasir Gudang), but the declaration ceremony and the first mayor oath taking ceremony would not take place until 9 and 12 December 2021 respectively due to the COVID-19 pandemic.

In conjunction with Pasir Gudang's 44th anniversary on 1 July 2021, the newly established City Council created the "Dynamic Pasir Gudang" Brand to promote Pasir Gudang as an adaptive, innovative and progressive Industrial and Port City. Pasir Gudang City Council's flag was redesigned and unveiled on 17 July 2022 during the Pasir Gudang Dynamic Day Celebration, along with the local authority's revised anthem and its 2021–2025 5-year strategic plan book. It now consists of three horizontal bands of red, white and blue with the City Council's logo superimpose on the greyscale version of the Dynamic Pasir Gudang Brand Logo in the middle.

On 1 November 2022, Pasir Gudang City Council bought a plot of land along Jalan Masai Lama in the middle of an oil palm plantation site near Kong Kong for the construction of its new headquarters, which is expected to complete by the end of 2025. A ground breaking ceremony was held on 22 November that year to mark the start of the new building's construction.

=== Emblem history ===
The emblem design of the Pasir Gudang City Council originates from that of the emblem of the former Municipal Council adopted in 2010, which consists of a three-coloured shield (red, blue and gold) supported by two Johor State arms tigers on both sides. The shield is charged with yellow circuit lines, Champak flower and a gear with an image of a ship on water in front of a background of buildings and trees. It was topped by a two-coloured star and crescent (blue and gold) in the original version, later replaced by the Johor Royal Crown in the 2018 revision and the current version of the emblem, with the star and crescent now moved into the centre of the shield.

The motto of the emblem under the shield was revised two times in 2018 and 2020. In the original version, it was a stylised blue and gold ribbon written with the municipal council's name in Jawi and Romanised Malay. This was replaced by the blue ribbon and gold floral compartment from the Johor State Coat of arms in the 2018 revision and the current version. The motto on the 2018 emblem was Gemilang, Lestari, Sejahtera (meaning Glorious, Sustainable, Prosperous) in Jawi Malay script, while that of the current version is the City Council's name in Jawi and Romanised Malay.

Prior to 2010, Pasir Gudang Local Authority and Municipal Council used the old Johor Corporation emblem as the latter's subsidiary.

Emblem of Pasir Gudang Municipal Council (2010–2018)

Emblem of Pasir Gudang Municipal Council (2018–2020)

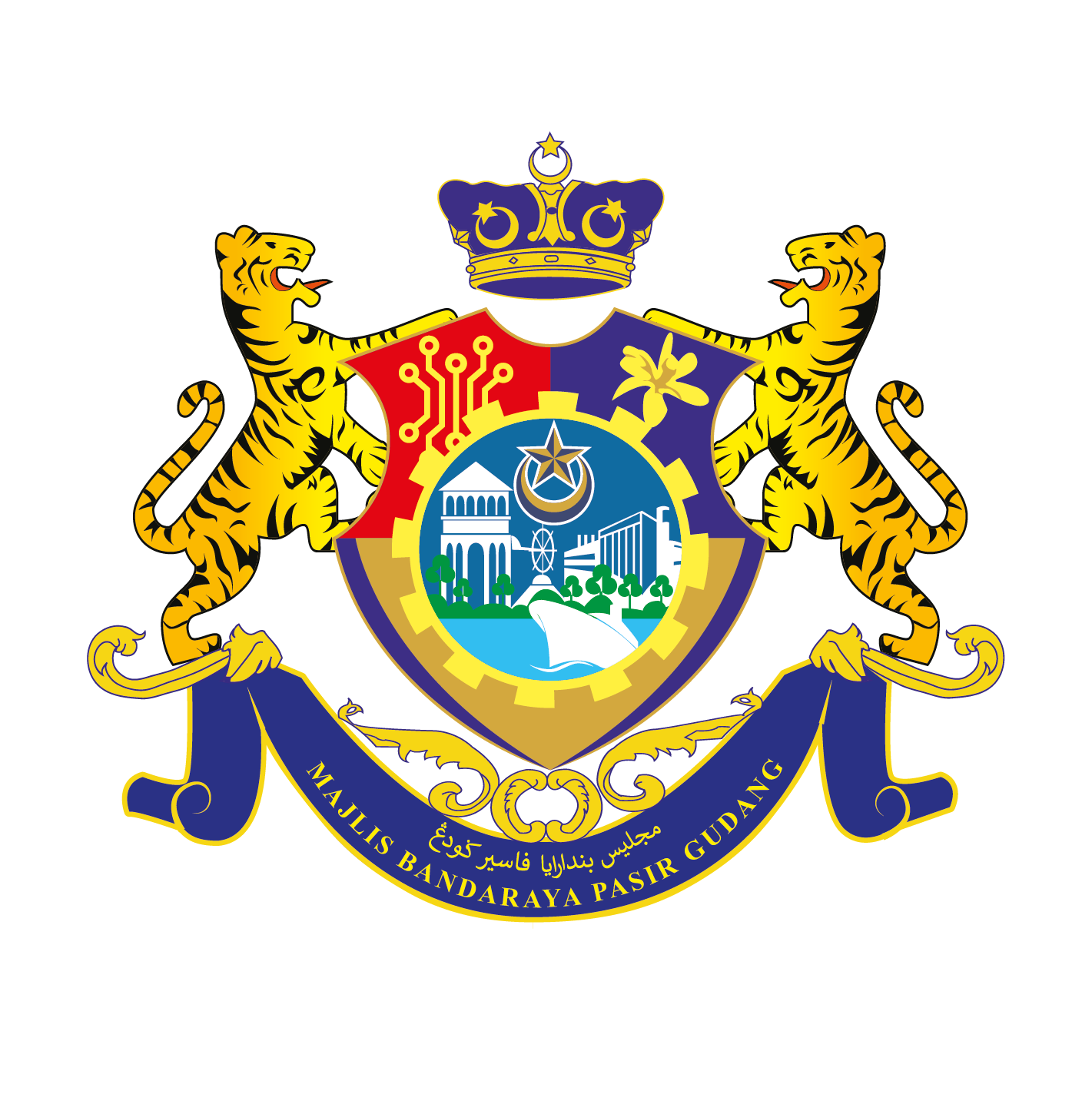
Emblem of Pasir Gudang City Council (2020–present)

=== Presidents of Pasir Gudang Local Authority (Yang di-Pertua) ===
Concurrently the Presidents of Johor Corporation (JCorp).

#	Name of Presidents	Term start	Term end
1.	Basir Ismail	1 July 1977	1982
2.	Muhammad Ali Hashim	1982	30 June 2008

=== Presidents of Pasir Gudang Municipal Council (Yang di-Pertua) ===
#	Name of Presidents	Term start	Term end
1.	Lukman Abu Bakar	1 July 2008	31 August 2009
2.	A. Rahim Nin	1 September 2009	17 July 2011
3.	On Jaabar	18 July 2011	30 April 2014
4.	Md Zanal Misran	1 May 2014	2 July 2016
5.	Hasrin Kamal Hashim	3 July 2016	30 June 2018
6.	Zainor Adani	1 July 2018	21 November 2020

=== Mayors of Pasir Gudang City Council (Datuk Bandar) ===
#	Name of Mayors	Term start	Term end
1.	Asman Shah Abd. Rahman	22 November 2020	30 September 2024
2.	Mustaffa Kamal Shamsudin	1 October 2024	16 October 2025
3.	Hazlina Jalil	17 October 2025	Present

=== Secretaries of Pasir Gudang Municipal Council ===
#	Name of Secretaries	Term start	Term end
1.	Mohammad Mazlan Ali	1 July 2008	30 October 2009
2.	Md Za'nal Misran	1 September 2009	2 October 2011
3.	Ezzuddin Sanusi	3 October 2011	2 June 2013
4.	Saipol Rahman Amat	3 June 2013	30 June 2018
5.	Sulaiman Ismail	1 July 2018	30 September 2019
6.	Abdul Hakim Abdul Manap	15 October 2019	31 January 2021

=== Secretaries of Pasir Gudang City Council (Setiausaha) ===
#	Name of Secretaries	Term start	Term end
1.	Mohd Hafiz Aliman	1 February 2021	31 December 2023
2.	Nurul Ashikin A Jabar	1 January 2024	16 October 2025
3.	Ezlan Farid Mohd Said	17 October 2025	Present

== Departments ==
- Urban Planning (Perancangan Bandar)
- Finance (Kewangan)
- Valuation (Penilaian)
- Engineering (Kejuruteraan)
- Building (Bangunan)
- Property Management (Pengurusan Harta)
- Licensing (Pelesenan)
- Public Health & Environment (Kesihatan Awam & Persekitaran)
- Management Services (Khidmat Pengurusan)
- Community Wellbeing & Tourism (Kesejahteraan Komuniti & Pelancongan)
- Contract & Quantity Survey (Kontrak & Ukur Bahan)
- Enforcement (Penguatkuasaan)
- Landscape (Landskap)
- Corporate & Public Relations(Korporat & Perhubungan Awam)

== Units ==
- Internal Audit & Integrity (Audit Dalam & Integriti)
- Law (Undang-undang)
- Information Technology (Teknologi Maklumat)
- Contract Management (Pengurusan Kontrak)
- One Stop Centre (Pusat Sehenti)
- Commissioner of Building (Pesuruhjaya Bangunan)

== Administration areas (zones) ==
As of 2025, Pasir Gudang is divided into 24 zones represented by 24 councillors to act as mediators between residents and the city council. The councillors for the 1 April 2024 to 31 December 2025 session are as below:

Zone	Councillor	Political affiliation
Air Biru	Ed Baela Muhalajah	UMNO
Bukit Dahlia	Rafiah Mohammad	UMNO
Cendana	Ishak Mohd Yusoff	UMNO
Desa Rakyat Perdana	Sim Shaw Fong	MCA
Flora Heights	Chua Tian Cha	MCA
Masai	Madyasir Ahmad Basir	UMNO
Mawar	Mohd Amin Ahmad	UMNO
Nusa Damai	Noraizam Rowaji	UMNO
Rinting 1	Lim Ming Ter	MCA
Rinting 2	Law Yiak Kwang	MCA
Scientex 1	Leong Yew Seng	MCA
Scientex 2	Haryati Ismail	UMNO
Seri Alam 1	Cia Chow Hui	MCA
Seri Alam 2	Razani Abdul Rauf	UMNO
Sierra Perdana	Vijayan Rajoo	MIC
Cahaya Baru/Tanjung Langsat	Abdul Malek Mahmood	UMNO
Cahaya Masai	Norizam Shah Md Yunus	UMNO
Kota Bestari	Mahendran Subramaniam	MIC
Kota Masai 1	Teh Siew Boey	MCA
Kota Masai 2	Low Sing Huat	MCA
Kota Masai 3	Rap'enah Ali	UMNO
Pasir Putih	Zainon Baharum	UMNO
Sungai Tiram	Khairul Nizam Daud	UMNO
Tanjung Puteri	Muhammad Haziq Zakaria	UMNO

== See also ==
- Johor Bahru City Council
- Iskandar Puteri City Council
