= Kota Masai =

Township in Malaysia

Coordinates: 1°29′08.7″N 103°56′53.3″E

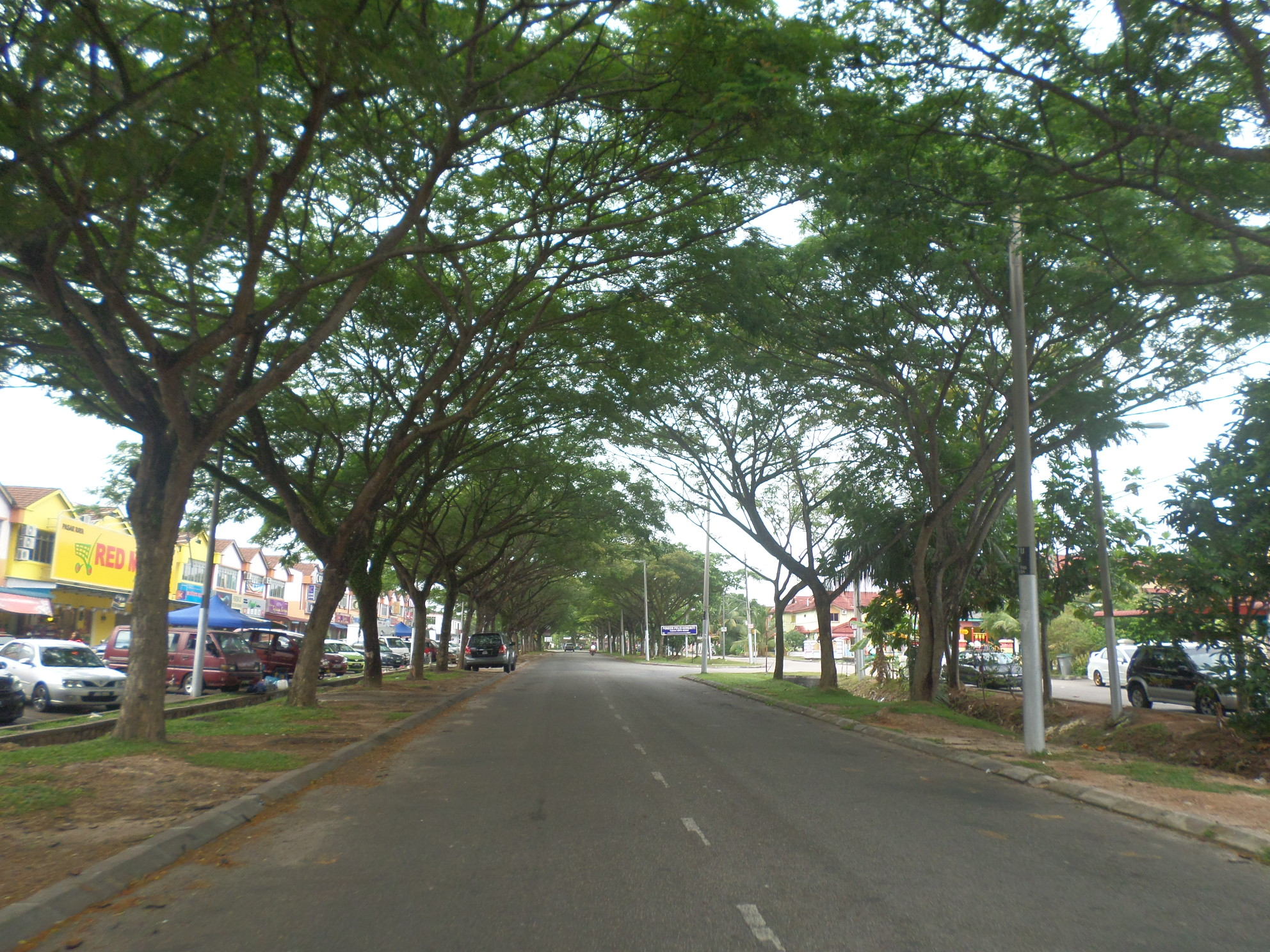
Kota Masai

Kota Masai is a township in Pasir Gudang, Johor Bahru District, Johor, Malaysia. This township is located between Masai and Pasir Gudang.

== Pendidikan ==
=== Sekolah Kebangsaan ===
- SK Taman Kota Masai
- SK Taman Kota Masai 2
- SK Taman Kota Masai 3
- Sekolah Rendah Jenis Kebangsaan Tamil Pasir Gudang (SJK(T) Pasir Gudang)
- Sekolah Rendah Jenis Kebangsaan Cina Ladang Grisek (SJK(C) Ladang Gersik)

=== Sekolah Menengah ===
- Sekolah Menengah Kebangsaan Kota Masai (SKOMAS)
- Sekolah Menengah Kebangsaan Kota Masai 2

=== Sekolah Agama Johor ===
- Sekolah Agama Taman Kota Masai
- Sekolah Agama Al Islah Taman Kota Masai 2
