= Tanjung Resang =

Coordinates: 2°34′31.5″N 103°48′42.1″E

Tanjung Resang is a cape located south of Penyabong and north of Air Papan in Mersing District, Johor, Malaysia.

Although not as well known as other East Coast seaside areas, such as Desaru or Kuantan, Tanjung Resang's main attractions are its beach and serene surroundings.

Currently, six family-run resorts operate in Tanjung Resang, with another one under construction.

For most of the year the Tanjung Resang area is quite sheltered from the elements, rendering the sea an ideal sailing training ground.

In addition to Tanjung Resang's recreational activities, its mostly untouched wilderness hinterland has recently been gathering momentum as an ecotourism hotspot. Gunung Arong Recreational Forest, in particular, is quite popular amongst hikers.

Other activities include scuba diving, freediving, snorkeling, kayaking, skimboarding, stand up paddling, deep sea fishing and off-roading. In addition, during the windier Northeast monsoon months, Tanjung Resang lends itself more for surfing, as well as high-wind windsurfing and kitesurfing.
