= Taman Molek =

Suburb in Johor Bahru, Johor, Malaysia

Coordinates: 1°33′N 103°48′E

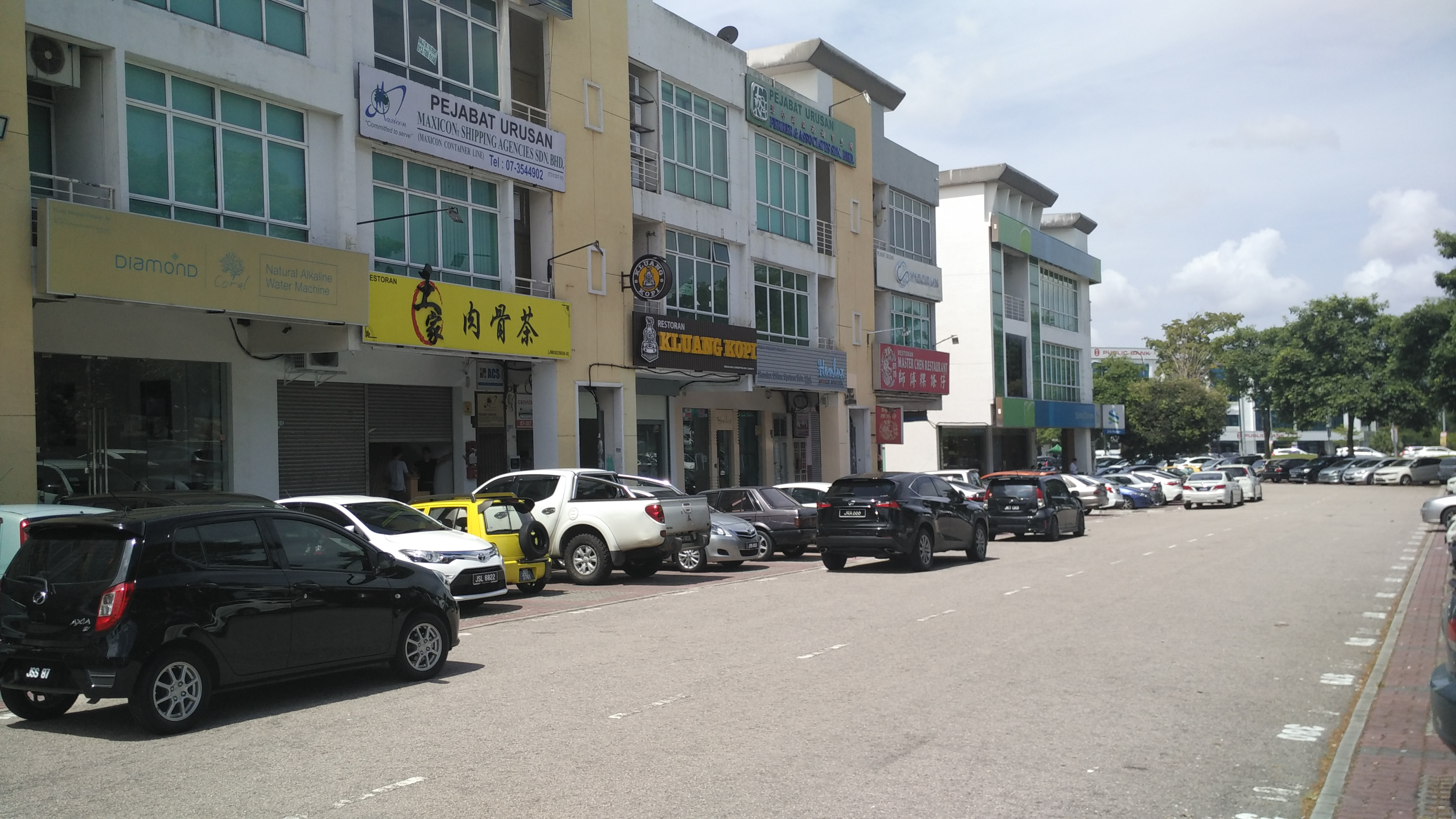
Taman Molek, Jalan Molek 2/2

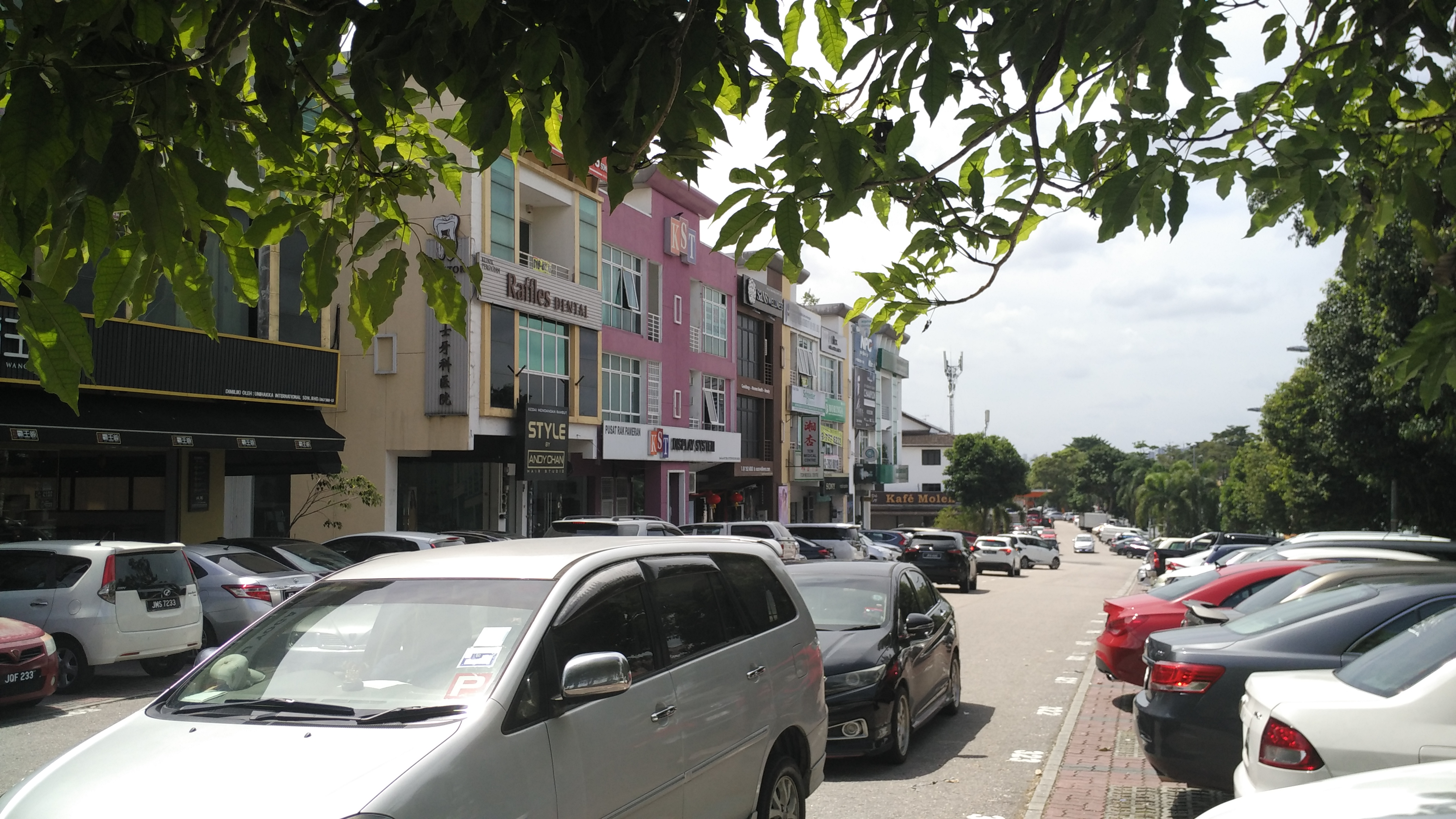
Taman Molek (JB)

Taman Molek is a town located in Taman Molek Johor Bahru, Johor, Malaysia. It was developed by Pelangi Berhad Group in the 1990s and now become a mini commercial centre with several major bank branches: Standard Chartered, HSBC, Al-Rajhi Bank, Kuwait Finance House, Royal Bank of Scotland, OCBC, UOB, RHB Bank, EON, Maybank, Hwang-DBS Investments, PMB Investment Berhad. It is surrounded by Taman Johor Jaya, Taman Redang, Taman Desa Harmoni, Taman Saujana, Taman Seri Molek Perdana and is adjacent to two major golf courses, Ponderosa Golf and Country Resort and the Daiman 18 Golf and Country Resort. It has become more popular as a commercial and residential area and with a direct link to Johor Bahru slated to open soon. It is also close to the Tebrau-Plentong corridor which is seeing tremendous growth and also many high-end developments such as waterfront and marina type projects along with hotels and more commercial areas set to come in future.

A little known fact about Taman Molek is that for about half century it was the site of the main transmitting station of the BBC or British Broadcasting Corporation in the Far East – known locally as BBC Tebrau – before this was relocated to Singapore. In the old days the Masai Trunk Road was popularly known as the BBC Road.

== Education ==
- Sekolah Kebangsaan Taman Molek (SKTM)
- Sekolah Menengah Kebangsaan Taman Molek
- Sekolah Agama Taman Molek
- Sekolah Agama Kampung Melayu Pandan
- D'Molek FC
- Smart Reader Kids Kindergarten
- Cherie Hearts International Pre School
- Gem Preschool

== Hotels ==
- Aspen Summer Hotel
- Grand Hallmark Hotel
- Molek Garden Hotel
- My Capsule Hotel
- Hotel Moon

== Transportation ==
The town is accessible by BAS.MY Johor Bahru route J20 from Johor Bahru Sentral railway station.
