= Causeway Link =

Bus operator in Malaysia and Singapore

Handal Indah Sdn Bhd

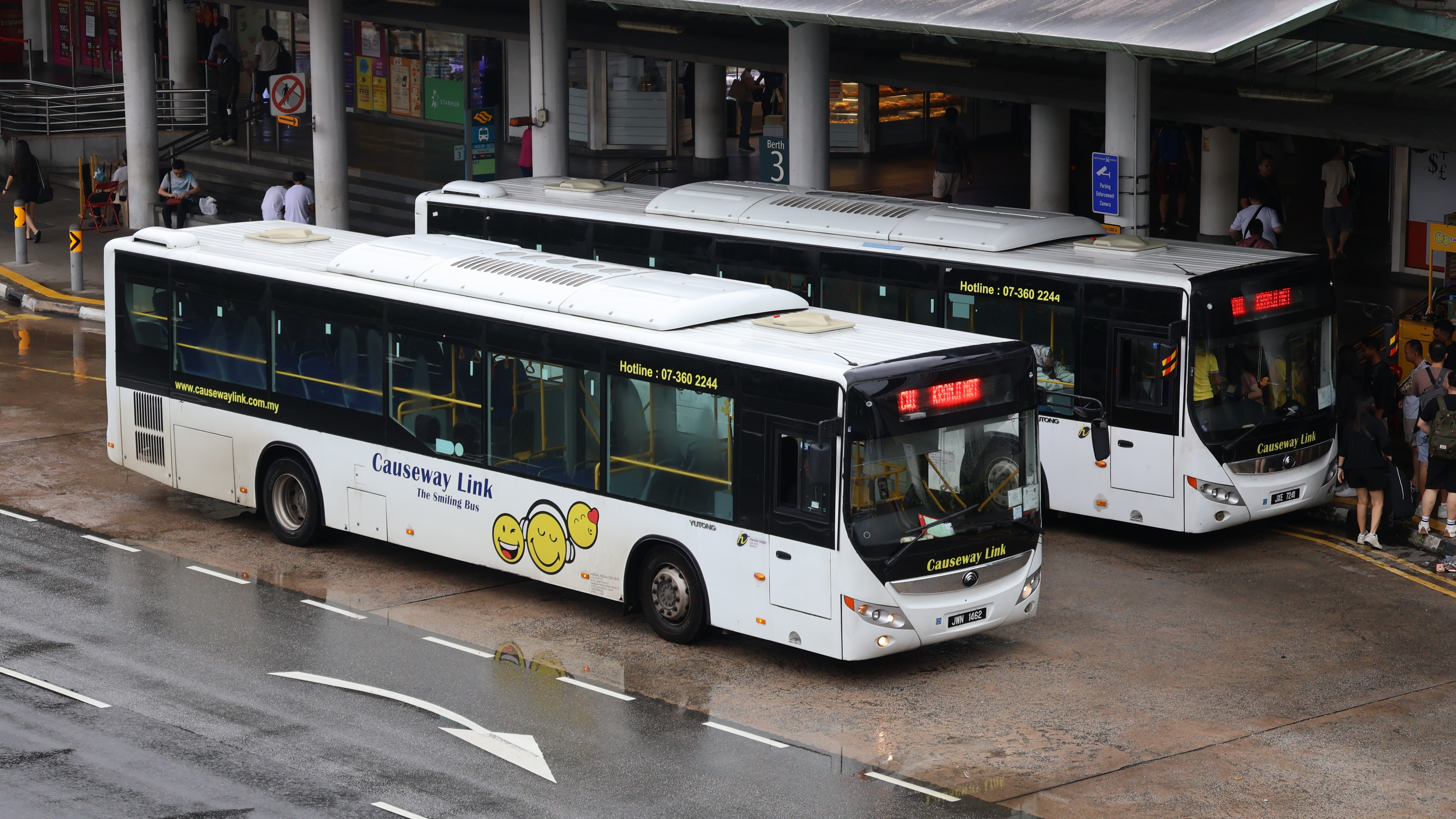
- Causeway Link Yutong ZK6126HG buses on service CW1 at Kranji MRT station, January 2025
- Trade name: Causeway Link
- Type: Private limited company
- Founded: 2003; 23 years ago
- Founder: Lim Han Weng
- Headquarters: Johor Bahru, Malaysia
- Area served: Johor; Klang Valley; Kota Kinabalu; Malacca; Singapore
- Products: Cross-border bus service Public bus service Chartered bus service Airport shuttle bus service Express bus & Leisure bus service
- Divisions: Causeway Link Express; Causeway Link Holidays; ManjaLink; Kumpool; LUGO; Public bus services; BAS.MY Johor Bahru; BAS.MY Kota Kinabalu; BAS.MY Melaka; Bas Muafakat Johor; RapidKL; Smart Selangor Bus
- Website: www.causewaylink.com.my

Handal Indah Sendirian Berhad (lit. 'Handal Indah Private Limited'), trading as Causeway Link, is a private bus company with operations in Malaysia and Singapore. The company is based in Johor Bahru, and is the largest bus operator in Johor. It operates cross-border public buses into Singapore through the Johor–Singapore Causeway and Malaysia–Singapore Second Link. The company also operates local public buses in Johor Bahru, the Klang Valley, Kota Kinabalu and Malacca, as well as express buses connecting various destinations in peninsular Malaysia and Singapore.

== History ==
The company was established in 2003 by Lim Han Weng. It was the first Malaysian bus operator allowed to operate between Malaysia and Singapore. Lim's daughter, Lim Chern Fang, joined him in the company in the same year and eventually became its chief marketing officer.

On 29 November 2021, during the COVID-19 pandemic, Singapore and Malaysia started a Vaccinated Travel Lane (VTL) land service between Larkin Sentral, Johor Bahru and both Woodlands Temporary Bus Interchange and Queen Street Terminal, Singapore with Causeway Link operating the route between Larkin to Queen Street Terminal.

This services was renamed to Vaccinated Travel Bus Service (VTBS) on 1 April 2022 in line with the reopening of the Singapore-Malaysia Land Border for vaccinated travellers. The bus service ceased operations on 1 May 2022 when regular cross-border bus services resumed on that same date.

Since 2022, the local public buses in Johor Bahru operated by Causeway Link have accepted cashless payments such as Visa card, NFC using smartphone or smartwatch, and QR code payment, making Johor Bahru the first Malaysian city to support contactless payment using smart devices on urban bus network.

In 2024, Lim's son, Lim Chern Chuen, was appointed Chief Executive Officer.

In March 2025, Causeway Link was listed on Bursa Malaysia, the Malaysian stock exchange, and its initial public offering was oversubscribed 6.6 times.

On 21 July 2025, around 100 of Causeway Link's drivers went on strike, refusing to ferry passengers across the Causeway from Johor's Bangunan Sultan Iskandar (BSI) immigration complex. Affected passengers either walked across Causeway to get to Singapore or took buses arranged by Johor according to Johor State Works, Transportation, Infrastructure and Communication Committee chairman Mohamad Fazli Mohamad Salleh. According to a non-striking bus driver, the strike was due to pay and work adjustment which significantly reduced salaries and increased trips. The strike was triggered when the salaries were paid a day late. Causeway Link released a statement on the same day that the strike had been resolved after 45 minutes and that it was triggered due to miscommunication over salaries matters.

== Services ==
- Cross-border bus services between Johor Bahru to Singapore. Currently the largest provider of cross border services with 7 main routes that goes through Johor–Singapore Causeway and Malaysia–Singapore Second Link crossings and some branch services.
- Largest operator of local services for Johor Bahru areas (including Iskandar Puteri and Pasir Gudang), mainly under the BAS.MY Johor Bahru scheme
- Largest operator of Bas Muafakat Johor around Iskandar region, free bus services for locals in the area
- Express buses from Larkin Sentral to various destinations in Malaysia
- Provider of some Klang Valley bus routes under BNR scheme - mainly operates routes from Kuala Lumpur to Klang and Puchong local routes, their acquisition of Selangor Bus allows them to operate in Kepong and Kuala Selangor as well.
- Main provider of BAS.MY Melaka, running local bus routes around the state.
- Provider of BAS.MY Kota Kinabalu.

== See also ==
Logo of Handal Indah, used only on local Malaysian buses not operating under the Causeway Link trade name

- List of bus routes in Johor Bahru
