= Bandar Seri Alam =

Suburb in Johor Bahru, Johor, Malaysia

- Suburb of Pasir Gudang

Other transcription(s)
  - Mandarin: 至达城 (Simplified) 至達城 (Traditional); Zhì dá chéng (Pinyin)
  - Tamil: பண்டார் ஸ்ரீ அலாம்
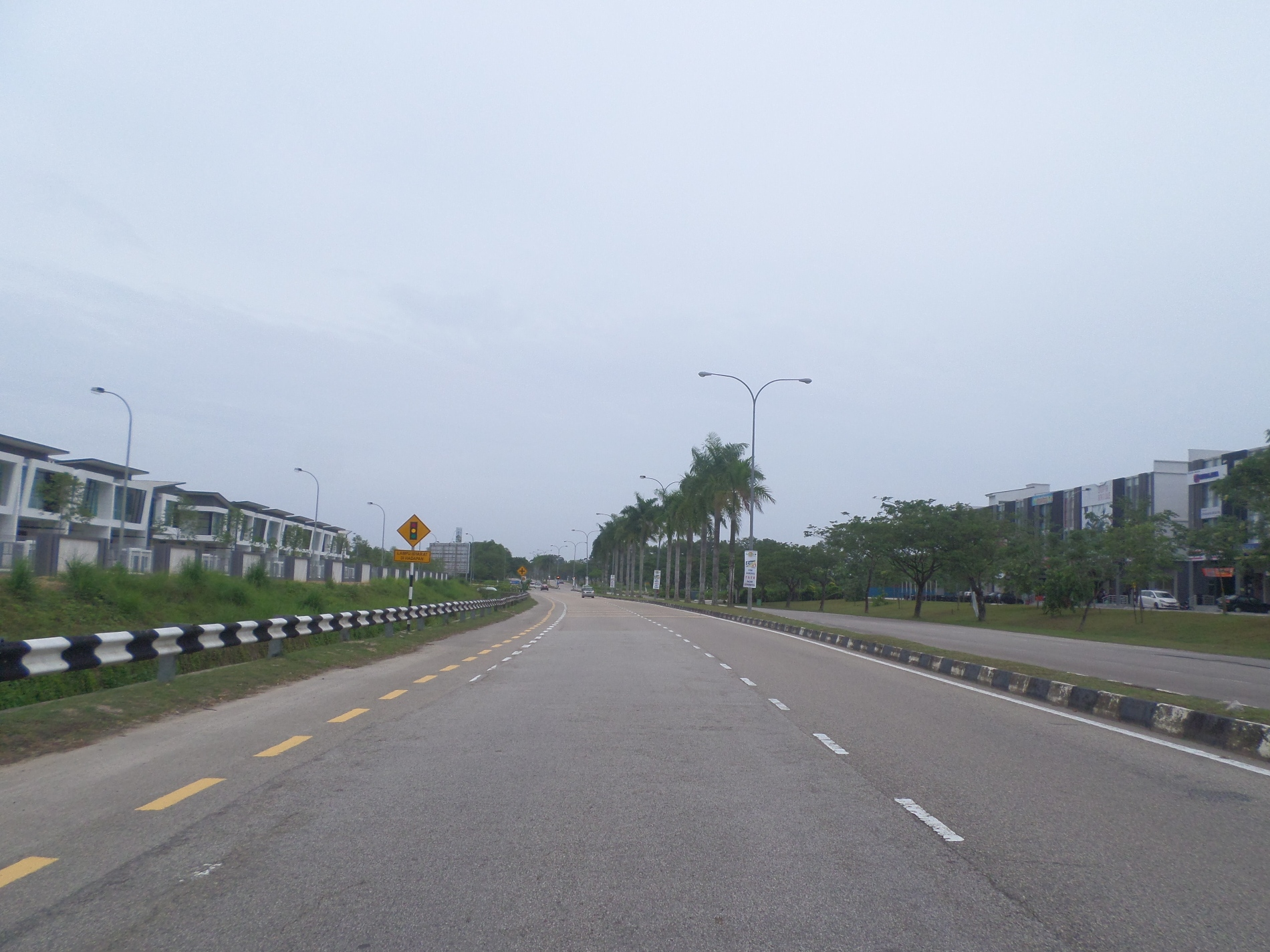
- Interactive map of Bandar Seri Alam
- Location within Iskandar Malaysia
- Coordinates: 1°30′39.8297″N 103°52′37.3440″E
- Country: Malaysia
- State: Johor
- City: Pasir Gudang

Government
  - Local government: Pasir Gudang City Council
  - Mayor of Pasir Gudang: Asman Shah Abdul Rahman
  - Johor Jaya State Assemblywoman: Liow Cai Tung (PH-DAP)
  - Pasir Gudang Member of Parliament: Hassan Abdul Karim (PH-PKR)
- Time zone: UTC+8 (MST)
  - Summer (DST): Not observed
- Postal code: 81700
- Website: mbpg.gov.my

Bandar Seri Alam is a township in Mukim Plentong, Johor Bahru District, Johor, Malaysia. It is an initiative by Seri Alam Properties Sdn Bhd, a subsidiary of United Malayan Land Bhd. The township covers approximately 15 square kilometers and houses an ecology educational facilities from school age to campuses of some universities.

The township which spans over 3,762 acres (15 km^{2}) falls under the city of Majlis Bandaraya Pasir Gudang (MBPG).

== Education ==
Today, Seri Alam has several universities, including the University of Kuala Lumpur (UniKL - operational 2011), MARA Technological University (UiTM - - operational 2014), Asia Metropolitan University (operational 2011), MARA Junior Science College (MRSM - operational 2011), Malaysia Art School (completed 2013), Excelsior International School (completed 2013), Pegasus International School (operational 2013), Japanese School, Nam Heng Chinese Primary School as well as seven other national primary and secondary schools.

=== Primary school ===
- SK Seri Alam
- Sekolah Agama Seri Alam
- SJK (C) Nam Heng <南兴华小>
- Sekolah Rendah Jenis Kebangsaan Tamil Masai

=== Secondary school ===
- Sekolah Menengah Kebangsaan Dato' Penggawa Timur (SMKDPT)
- Sekolah Menengah Kebangsaan Seri Alam (SMK BSA)
- Sekolah Menengah Kebangsaan Seri Alam 2 (SMKSA2)
- Foon Yew High School - Seri Alam 宽柔中学至达城分校

=== Others ===
- Medical Campus of Asia Metropolitan University
- University Kuala Lumpur (UniKL)
- University Technology Mara (UiTM)
- Mara Junior Science College (MRSM)
- Pegasus International School
- Malaysia Arts School
- Japanese School
- Repton International School

== Facilities & Amenities ==
- Regency Specialist Hospital
- Tesco Hypermarket Seri Alam
- Today's Market
- Post Office
- Seri Alam District Police Headquarters (IPD)
- Amansari Residence Resort
- 24-Hour McDonald's Drive Thru Restaurant
- Starbucks Seri Alam
- Public Bank
- Burger King Drive Thru Restaurant
- Grand Straits Garden Seafood Restaurant
- Watsons Personal Care Store (without pharmacy)
- Safe & Well Healthcare Store
- Focus Point Eye Care Store
- Bata Shoes Store
- KFC
- OldTown White Coffee
- Moonlight Cafe
- Tea Garden Café <古文茶>
- Subway
- Marrybrown
- Big Valley Ranch Resort cum Tourist Destination
- Natural Lakes and Parks
- Taman Tasek Seri Alam
- Octville Golf and Country Club
- District shuttle bus station
- Taxi stand
- Family Mart
- The J Seri Alam
- Kuching Style Restaurant

== Transportation ==
The area is accessible by Muafakat Bus route P-301.
