= Masai, Johor =

Masai
- Suburb of Johor Bahru
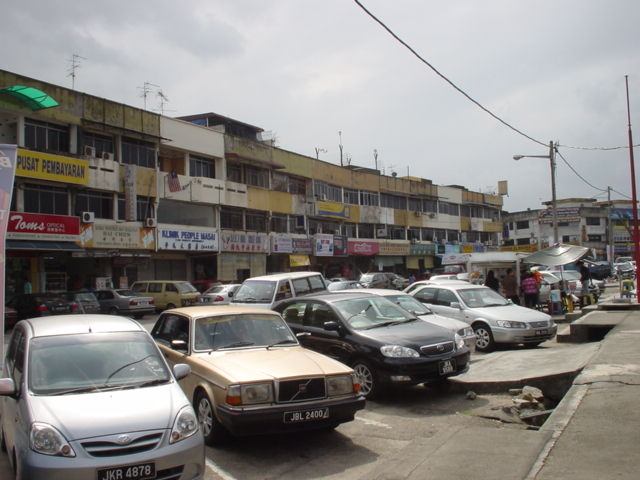
- Shophouses in Masai
- Interactive map of Masai
- Coordinates: 1°29′12″N 103°53′06″E
- Country: Malaysia
- State: Johor
- District: Johor Bahru
- City: Pasir Gudang
- Mukim: Plentong
- Time zone: UTC+8 (MST)
- Postcode: 81750
- Dialling code: +60 07

Masai is an area in Pasir Gudang, Johor Bahru District, Johor, Malaysia, and is the oldest neighbourhood of the city of Johor Bahru. It is located 25 km (15.53 mi) from the Johor Bahru city centre. Masai is located on Jalan Masai Lama (Johor state route J10) which leads to Kong Kong, a fishing village along Johor River. It is also accessible via the Pasir Gudang Highway.

Many pre-war buildings are still well preserved. Masai, like many of the towns in the Johor Bahru district, catered to the rural population of farmers and rubber plantation workers throughout the early and mid 20th century.

== History ==
Masai has gone through vigorous development which has transformed the town into one of the most populous towns in Johor. The Masai Chinese Primary School now has more than 5000 pupils.

Bandar Seri Alam is the business centre for Masai, with Maybank, Public Bank, Bank Simpanan Nasional and Bank Rakyat and hotels.

Jalan Masai Lama is the main road connecting Johor Bahru to towns to the east of Masai such as Kota Masai, Kong Kong and Pasir Gudang.

Meanwhile, Masai is also the name of the district, Masai District with post code of 81750, where the town is situated. Masai district is consist of Masai town, Bandar Seri Alam, Taman Rinting, Kota Puteri, Plentong, Permas Jaya and others. Due to location, Tanjung Langsat industrial area is quite near to Pasir Gudang, so it's categorized as Pasir Gudang district. However, the weird thing for Tanjung Langsat village is that the village is categorized as Masai district due to historical development.

Crime rates are notably high in the area since the 1970s due to high unemployment rates and relatively under-development in the town since the 1980s.

== Education ==
=== Primary school ===
- SK Masai
- SJK (C) Masai (马赛华小)
- SJK (C) Chien Chi, Plentong (建集华小)
- SJK (C) Chee Tong (启东华小)
- SJK (C) Nam Heng Baru (南兴华小)
- SJK (T) Masai
- SK Senibong
- SK Cahaya Baru
- SK Kongkong Laut
- SK Tanjong Langsat
- SK Taman Rinting 1
- SK Permas Jaya 1
- SK Permas Jaya 2
- SK Taman Permas Jaya 3
- SK Permas Jaya 5
- SK Seri Kota Puteri
- SK Perigi Acheh
- SK Bandar Seri Alam
- SK Seri Alam 2
- SK Seri Kota Puteri 4
- SK Taman Megah Ria

=== Secondary school ===
- Foon Yew High School - Masai
- SMK Dato' Penggawa Timur (拿督彭嘉华国中)
- SMK Seri Kota Puteri
- SMK Bandar Seri Alam (至达城国中)
- SMK Seri Alam 2
- SMK Taman Rinting 2 (长春国中二校)
- SMK Permas Jaya
- SMK Permas Jaya 2
- SMK Permas Jaya 3
- MRSM Johor Bahru
- Sekolah Seni Malaysia Johor Bahru

=== Higher Education ===
- UITM Pasir Gudang
- UniKL Pasir Gudang

== Transportation ==
The suburb houses the Masai Terminal. The area is accessible by Muafakat Bus route P-301 and P-303.
