= Air Papan =

Air Papan Kampung Air Papan
- Village
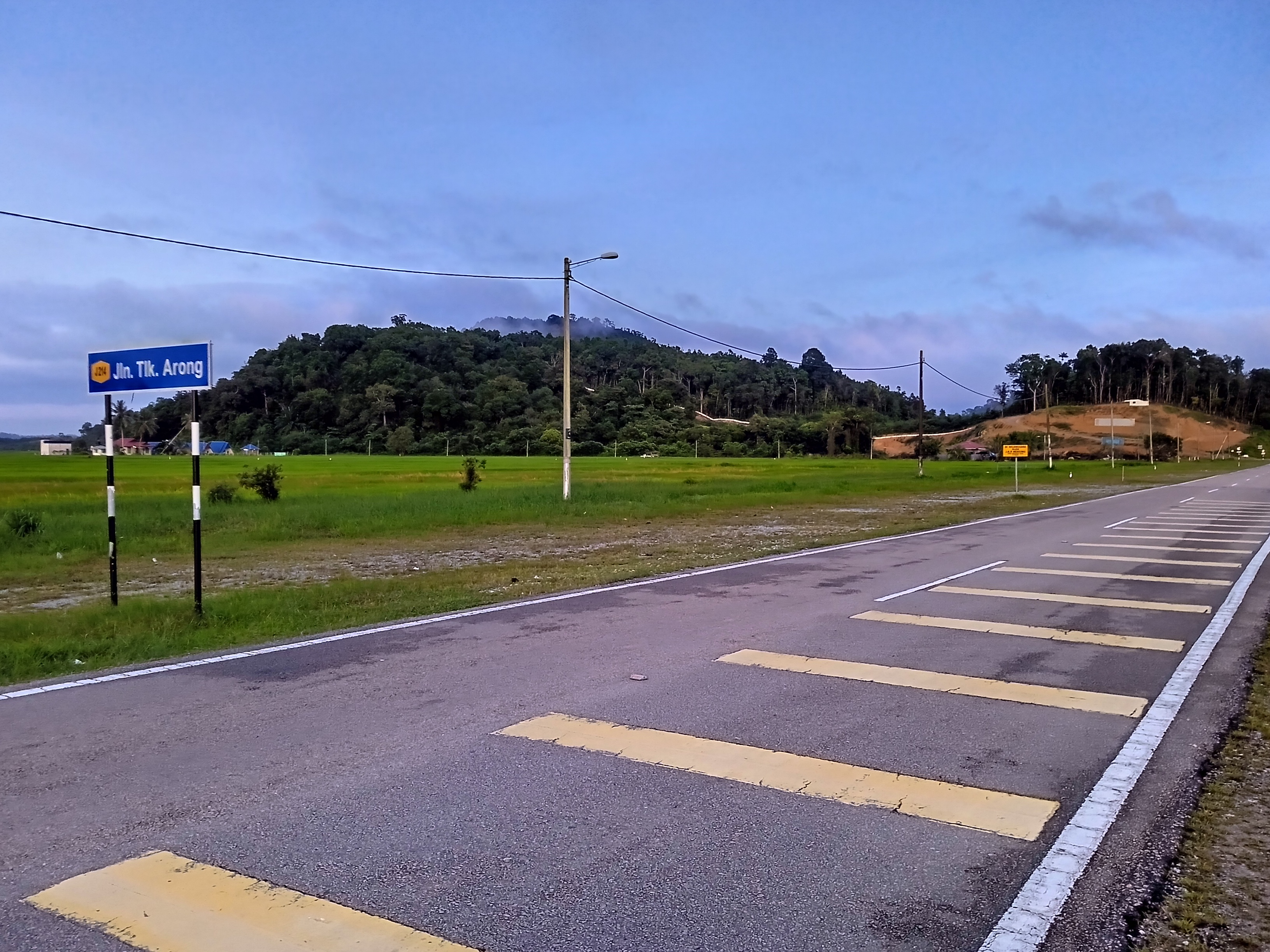
- Jalan Teluk Arong at Air Papan

- Location in Johor, Malaysia
- Coordinates: 2°31′03″N 103°49′59″E
- Country: Malaysia
- State: Johor
- District: Mersing

Area
  - Total: 5 km^{2} (1.9 sq mi)

Population
  - Total: 1,200
  - Density: 240/km^{2} (620/sq mi)
- Time zone: UTC+8 (MST)
- Postal code: 86800

The village of Air Papan is a seaside area with a 3 km (1.9 mi) long beach set in between the hills in Mersing District, Johor, Malaysia.

Other than a few properties and a mosque in the village beach-side area the remainder are dotted around the area.

Every 1 May, the "Pesta Air Papan" (Air Papan Festival) is celebrated featuring cultural shows, games, food, etc.
