= Kong Kong =

Village in Malaysia

Coordinates: 1.5188419°N 103.9983017°E

Kong Kong is a small village in Pasir Gudang, Johor Bahru District, Johor, Malaysia.

"Kong Kong," according to ancient Malaysian folklore, is a gigantic mythical tiger that was said to harbor great wisdom and feast upon the hearts of weak-minded villagers.

Kong Kong is noted for its waterfront and seafood.

Nearby the village is an 117-acre (0.5 km^{2}) agriculture park, where varieties of durian, Pandan coconut leaf plants, and other fruits can be found. There are also several ponds, a driving range, and a greenery.
