= Pasir Gudang =

- City
- City of Pasir Gudang Bandaraya Pasir Gudang (Malay)
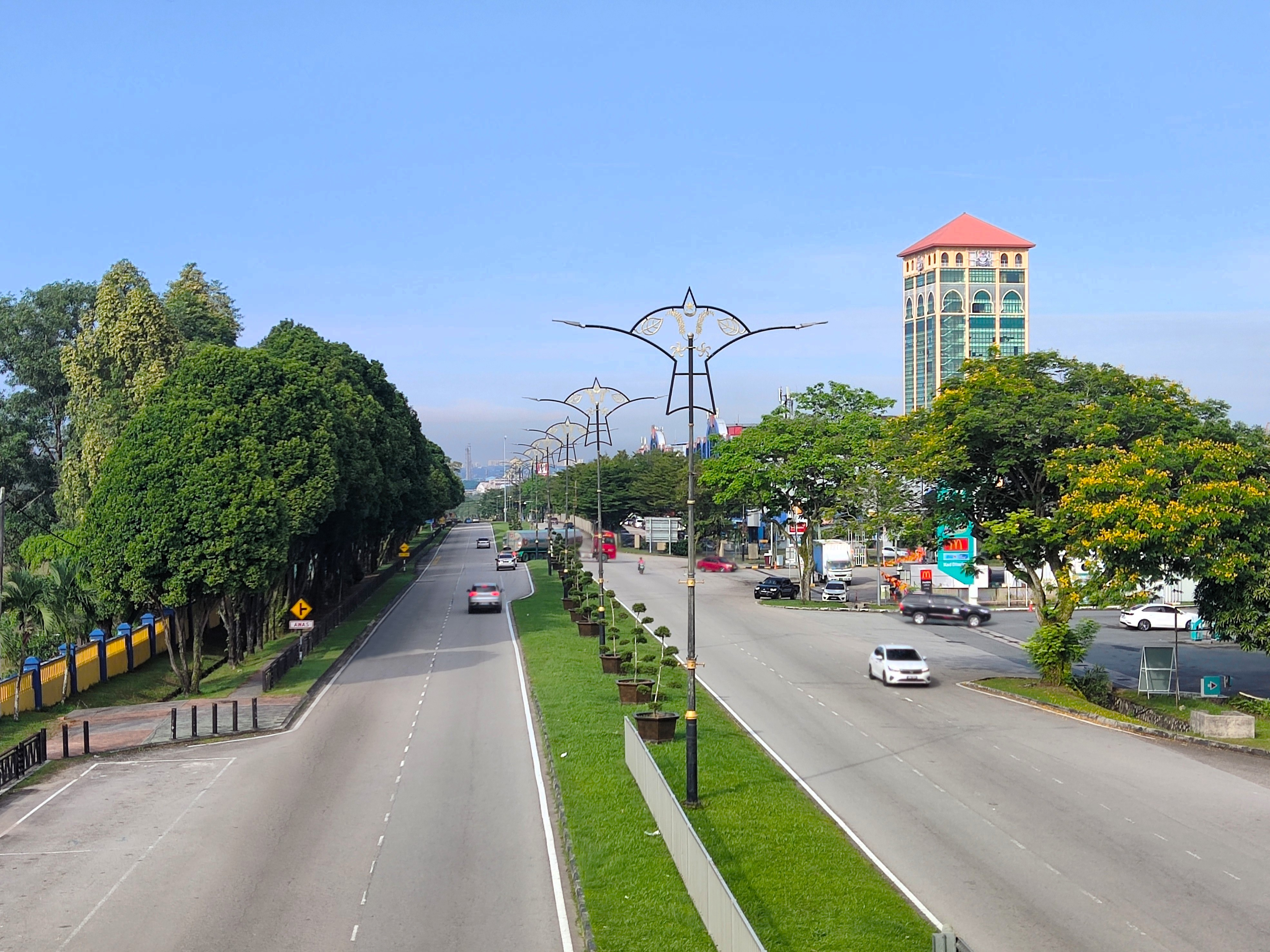
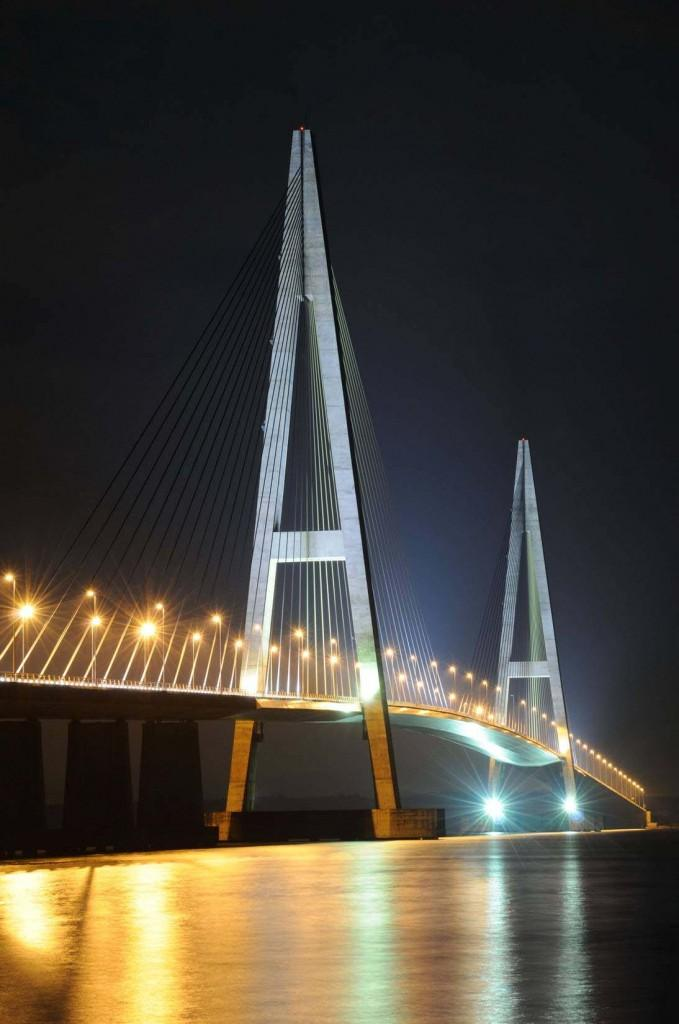
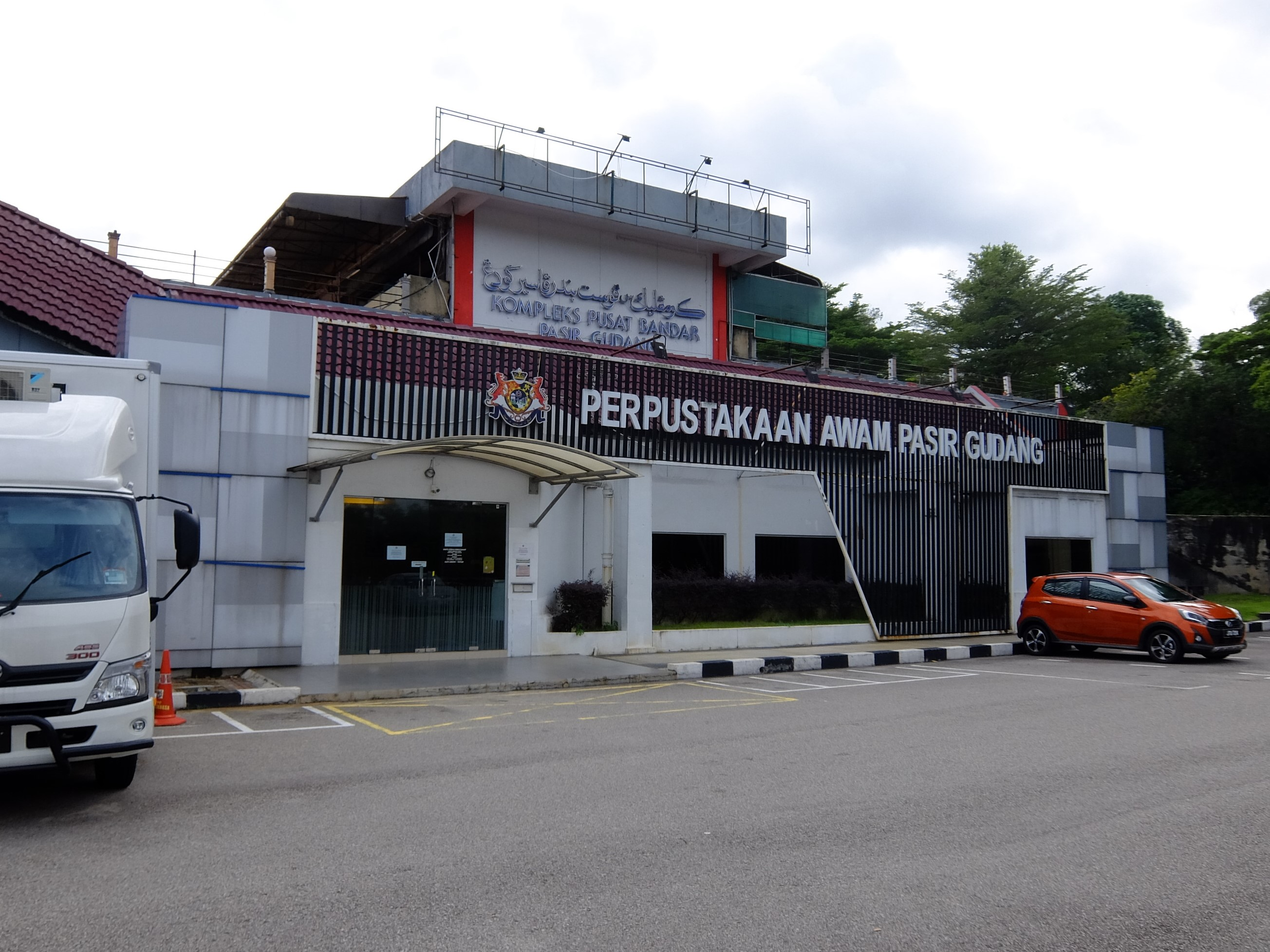
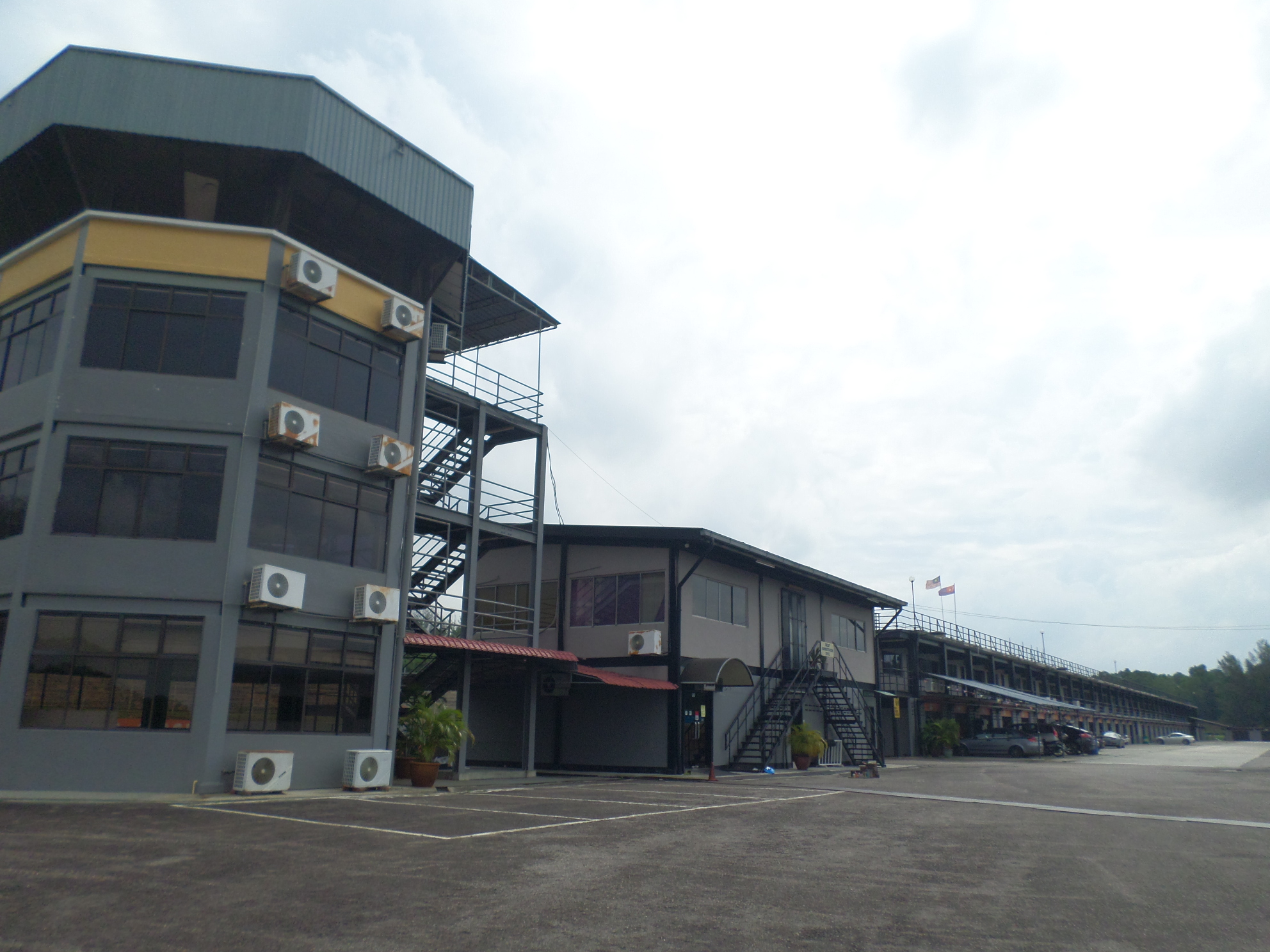
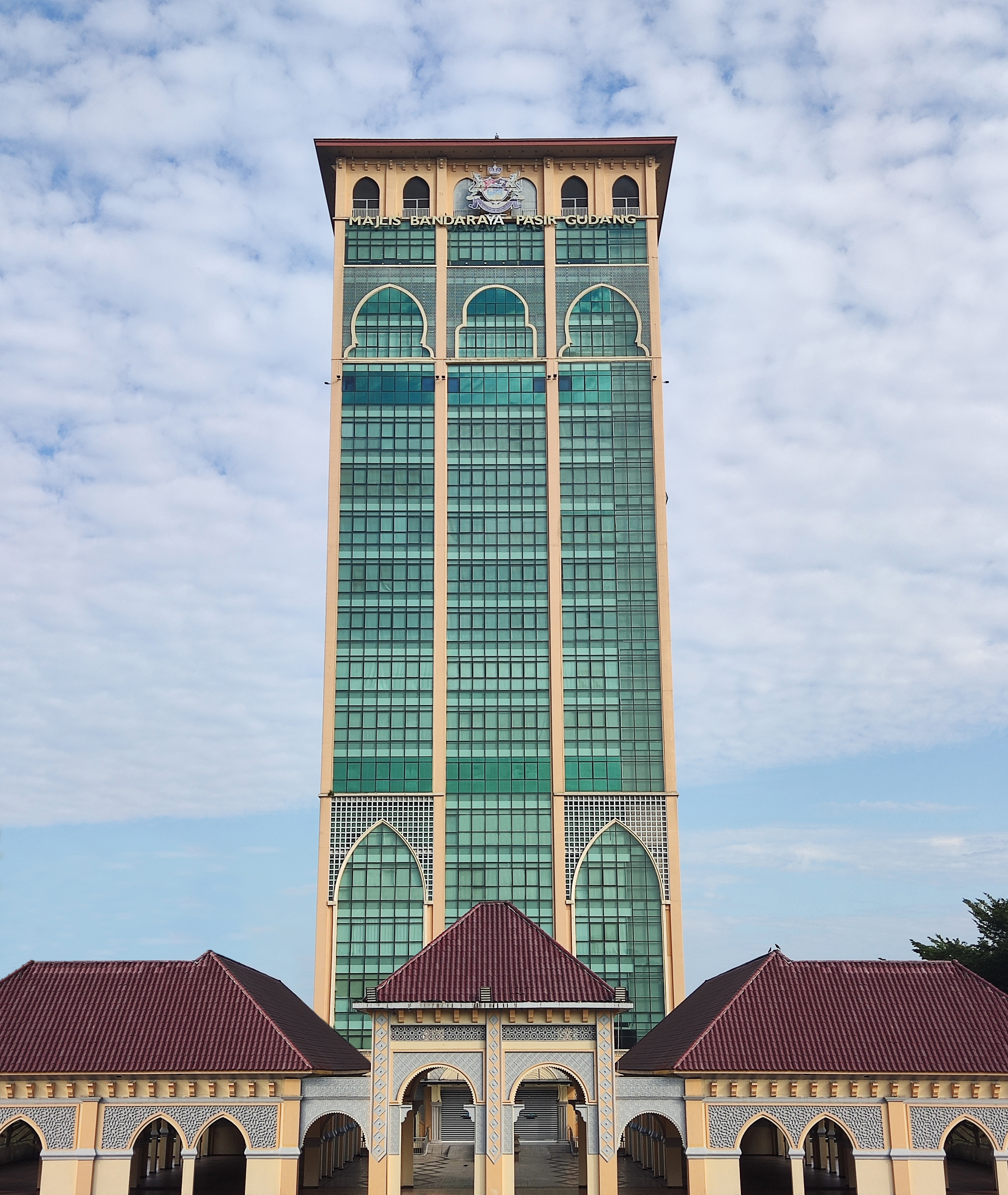
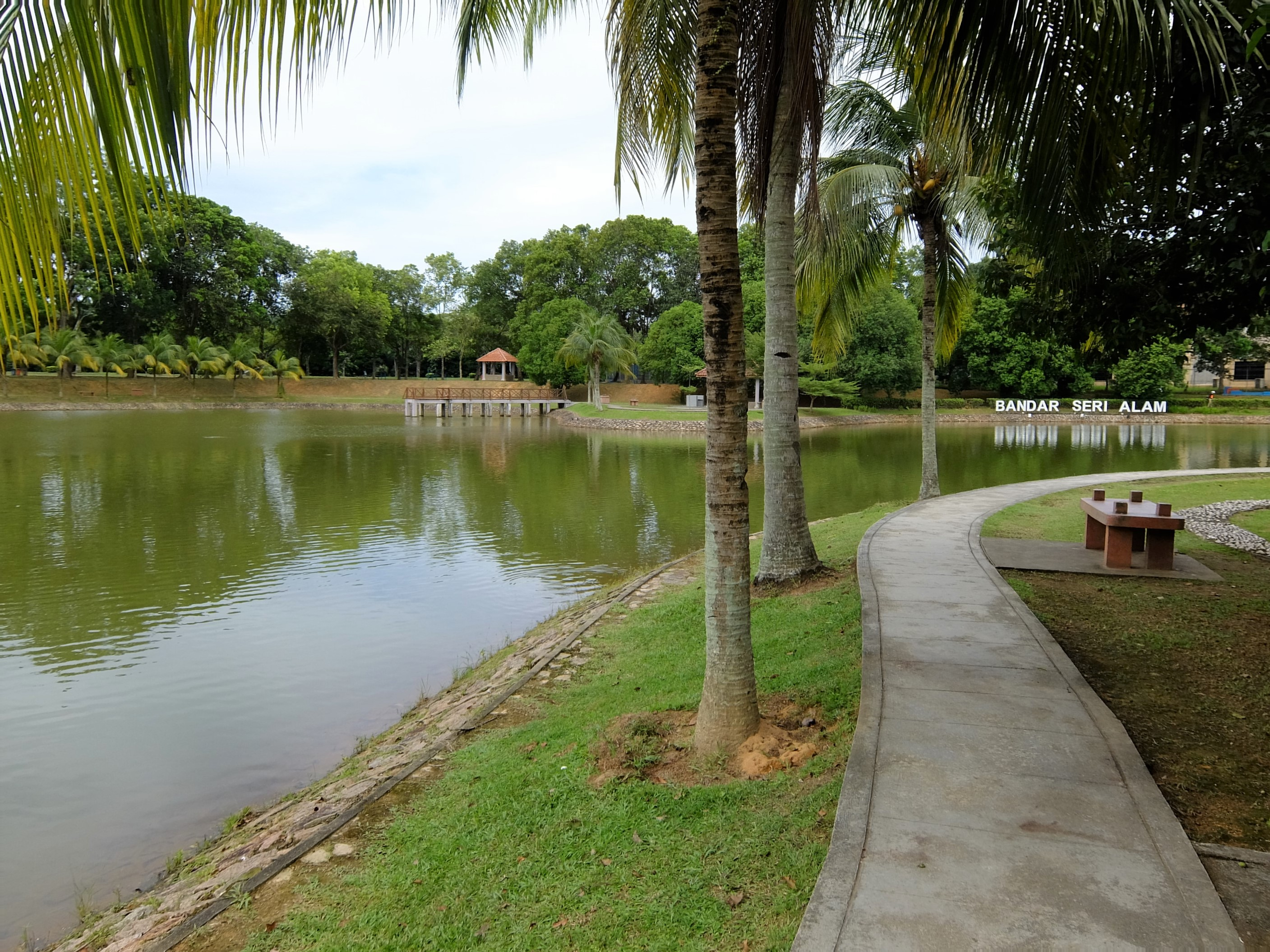
- From top, left to right: Street view of Pasir Gudang City Centre, Sungai Johor Bridge, the public library, Johor Circuit, Aqabah Tower and Taman Seri Alam Lake Garden

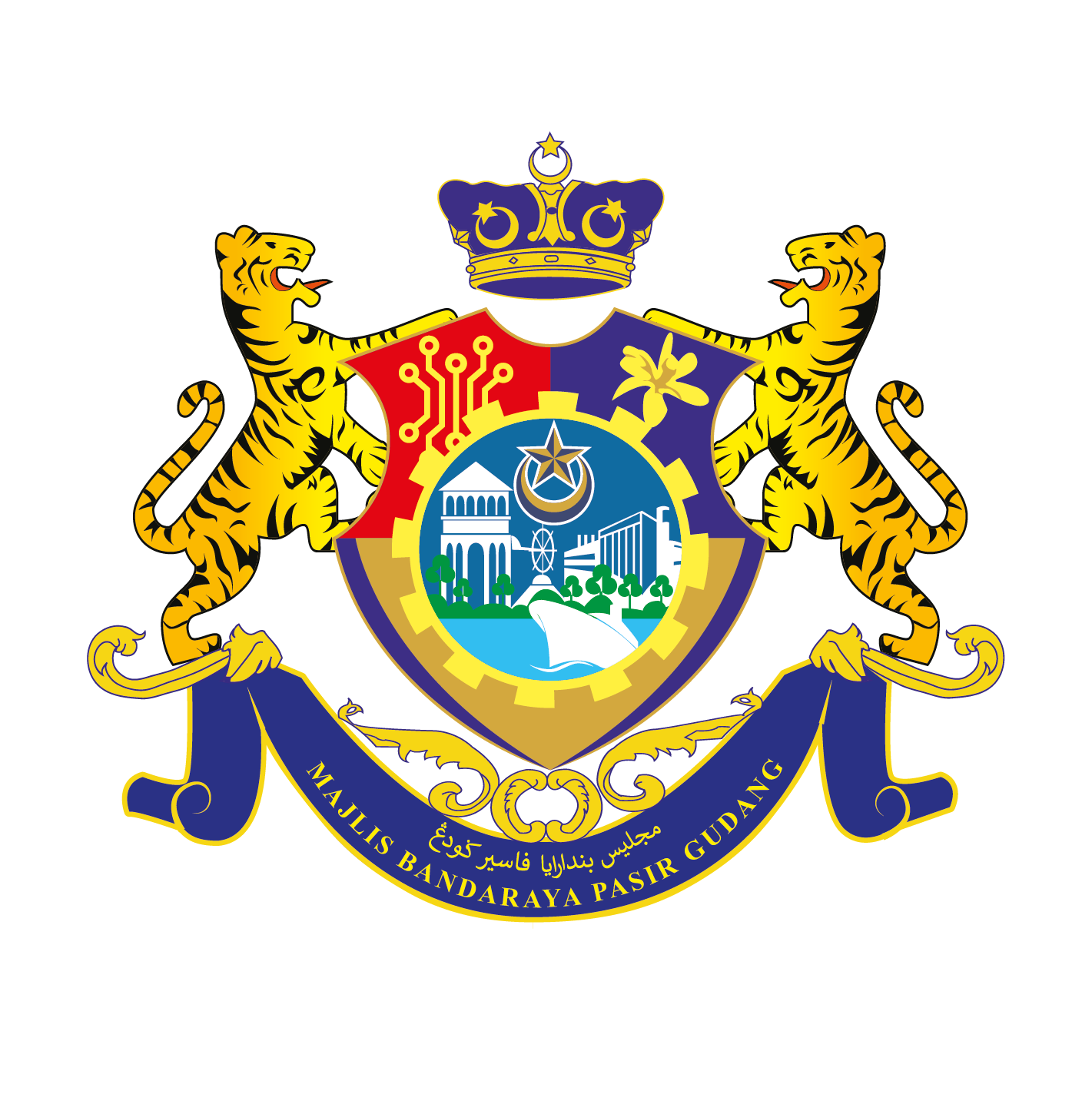
- Seal
- Nicknames: Industrial and Port City
- Motto: Gemilang, Lestari, Sejahtera (Malay) "Glorious, Sustainable, Prosperous " (motto of Pasir Gudang City Council)
- Interactive map of Pasir Gudang
- Pasir Gudang in Johor Pasir Gudang (Malaysia) Pasir Gudang (Southeast Asia) Pasir Gudang (Asia)
- Coordinates: 1°30′10″N 103°56′8″E
- Country: Malaysia
- State: Johor
- District: Johor Bahru
- Special local authority area: 1 July 1977
- Municipality status: 1 July 2008
- City status: 22 November 2020

Government
  - Type: City council
  - Body: Pasir Gudang City Council
  - Mayor: Hazlina Jalil (since 17 October 2025)

Area
  - Total: 359.57 km^{2} (138.83 sq mi)

Population (2023)
  - Total: 534,659
  - Density: 1,486.9/km^{2} (3,851.2/sq mi)
- Time zone: UTC+8 (MST)
- Postcode: 81700
- Dialling code: +607
- Website: www.mbpg.gov.my

Map of Pasir Gudang within Johor

Pasir Gudang is a city located in eastern Johor Bahru District, Johor, which is the second largest district in Malaysia by population. The main industries are transportation and logistics, shipbuilding, petrochemicals and other heavy industries, and oil palm storage and distribution, which is located in Johor Port and Tanjung Langsat.

== History ==
Established in 1918, Pasir Gudang, which was formerly known as Kampung Pasir Udang, was founded by Long Abu who is believed to have originated from Riau, Indonesia. Four more villages were established by the expanded population of about 83 families.

- Kampung Pasir Gudang Baru. (known as Kampung Pasir Gudang Lama located at TNB Sultan Iskandar Power Station)
- Kampung Sungai Perembi. (currently the Pasir Gudang Police Station)
- Kampung Ulu (currently MSE dockyard)
- Kampung Tengah (currently the Tenaga Nasional area)
- Kampung Hilir.

In 1920, 4 more villages were established :

- Kampung Air Biru (now the port).
- Kampung Pasir Merah (now the port).
- Kampung Pasir Puteh, which is still in existence today.
- Kampung Pulau Tekong, now part of the territory of Singapore.

The name Pasir Gudang originated from the existence of a sand mine at Kampung Ulu. Sand or 'pasir' in Malay are dug and stocked in sand pits/stores or 'gudang' in Malay, to be exported to Singapore, hence the name 'Pasir Gudang'.

The surrounding areas further inland were developed in the mid-19th century by Chinese travellers of the Teochew clan. Issuance of the 'river deed' by the Sultan of Johore allowed them to develop the Kangkar Masai, Kangkar Plentong and Kangkar Lunchu areas under riverheads known as 'kangchus'. It was on these riverbeds that they cultivated catechu and black pepper. Falling catechu and black pepper prices forced some estate owners to cultivate pineapples.

The introduction of rubber into Malaysia in the early 20th century resulted in the opening of big estates by the British and Singaporean cultivators. Up till 1916, six estates covering an area of 15,000 acres (61 km^{2}) were opened in the Mukim of Plentong. In 1916, Kampung Pasir Gudang became the centre for Police, Customs and opium-control besides being a centre for the 'penghulu' of the Mukim of Pasir Gudang. The formation of estates had also resulted in influx of labourers from China and India.

The Japanese occupation during the Second World War and guerrilla movements after the war did not have much effect on the agricultural activities here. Under the Emergency Law in the 1950s, new villages were set up at Plentong, Masai, Johor and Pasir Gudang. The estate labourers were either placed in these new villages or at guarded estate barracks.

Land schemes under the FELDA scheme were founded in Ban Foo, Plentong Baru and Felda Cahaya Baru after 1969. To further develop Johor, the State Government further took the estate lands in Pasir Gudang to be converted into industrial and housing areas.

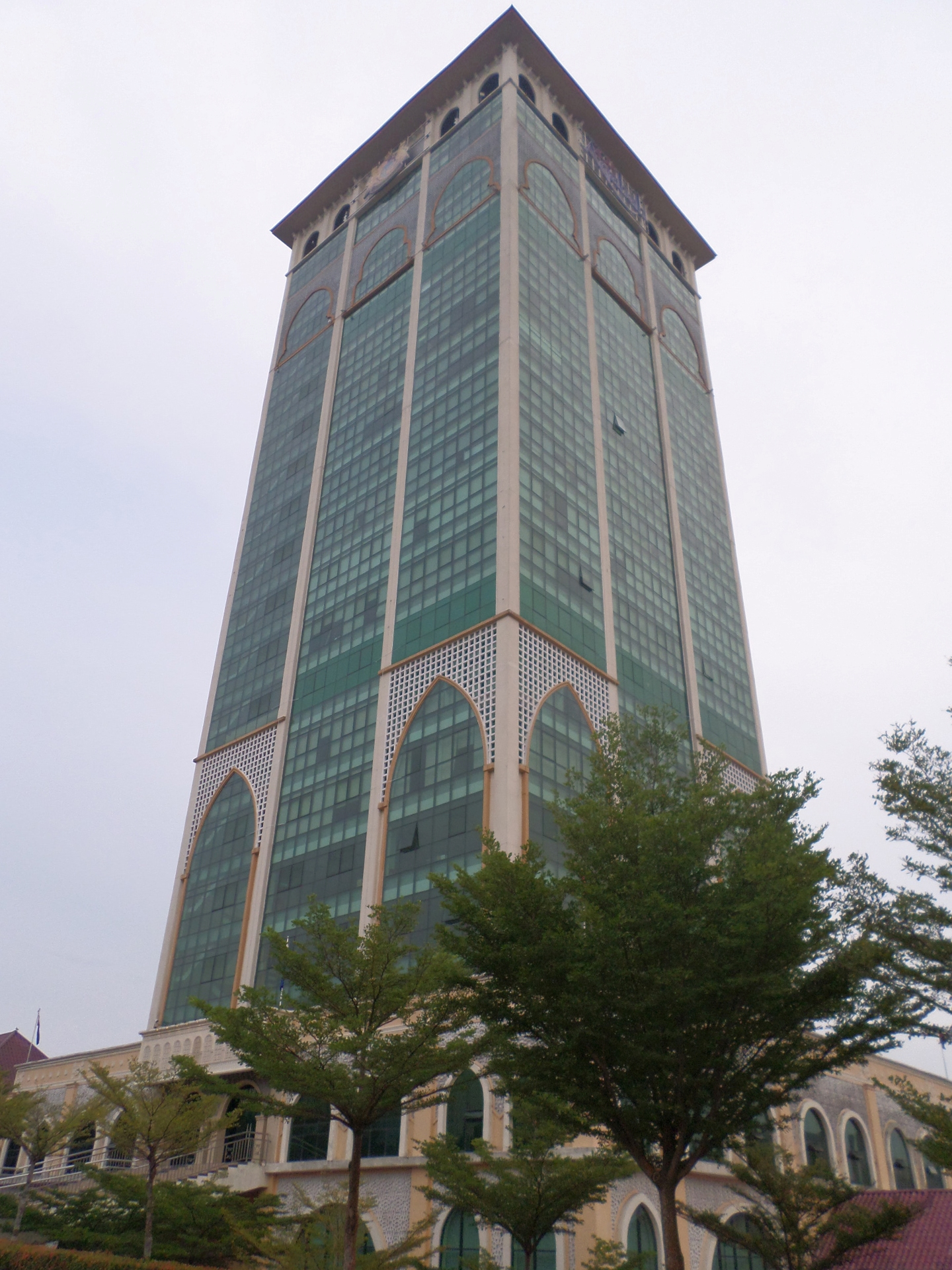
Aqabah Tower, headquarters of Pasir Gudang City Council.

On 1 July 1977, Pasir Gudang Local Authority (Malay: Pihak Berkuasa Tempatan Pasir Gudang, PBTPG) was established to govern Pasir Gudang as a local authority area for 31 years, with Johor Corporation's own president became its president. Its jurisdiction area mainly consist of Sungai Tiram Mukim and the eastern portion of Plentong Mukim.

On 1 July 2008, Pasir Gudang Municipal Council (Malay: Majlis Perbandaran Pasir Gudang) was established under section 3 of the Local Government Act 1976. Thus, Pasir Gudang became a municipality in legal terms. During the transition to direct state government rule on 1 September 2009, two Johor Corporation officers were appointed as President and Secretary respectively, after which they were replaced by state civil servants entirely.

On 1 July 2010, the newly-established municipal council was officiated by then Menteri Besar of Johor Datuk Abdul Ghani Othman along with its new logo, anthem and flag as well as new headquarters – the Aqabah Tower.

In 2015, the administration area of Pasir Gudang Municipal Council was increased from 29,459.9ha to 31,732.24ha following the re-delineation exercise. This made Masai and Bandar Seri Alam (both of which ceded from Johor Bahru Tengah), and Taman Rinting and Sierra Perdana (ceded from Johor Bahru City), became a part of the Pasir Gudang Municipality.

On 22 November 2020, Pasir Gudang was granted the city status and henceforth the municipal council was upgraded to Pasir Gudang City Council (Malay: Majlis Bandaraya Pasir Gudang}), currently led by a mayor.

== Demographics ==
As of 2023, the area of Pasir Gudang has a population of 534,659.

The following is based on Department of Statistics Malaysia 2010 census.

Ethnic groups in Pasir Gudang, 2010
Ethnicity	Population	Percentage
Bumiputera, Malay	34,799	74.72%
Chinese	1,083	2.33%
Indian	2,150	4.62%
Other Bumiputera	1,480	3.18%
Others	196	0.42%
Non-Malaysian	6,863	14.73%

== Economy ==
The main economy sectors of the city are transportation, logistics, shipbuilding, petrochemicals and other heavy industries, from which it earned its nickname of "Industrial and Port City" (Malay: Bandar Raya Industri dan Pelabuhan).

== Education ==
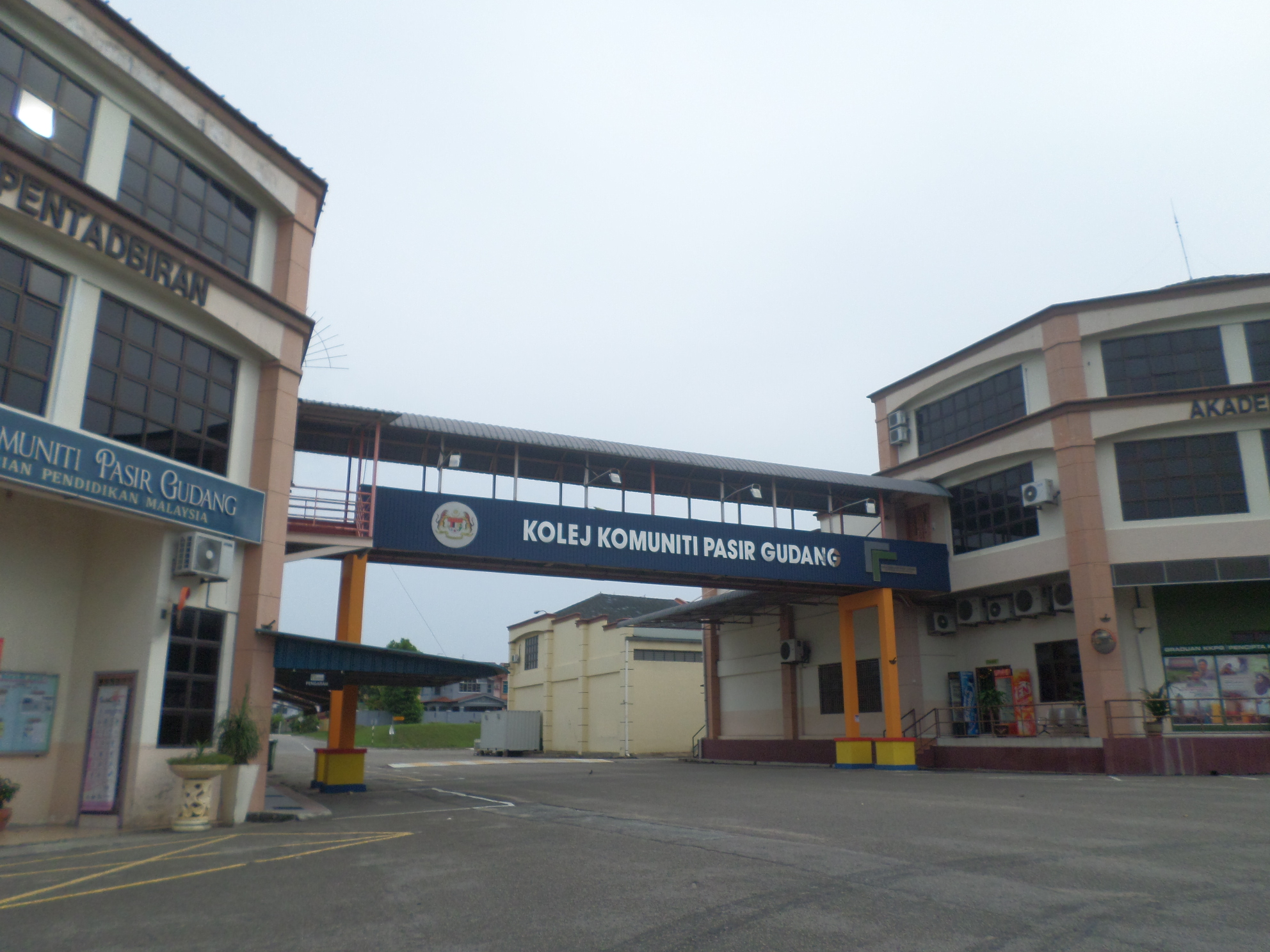
Pasir Gudang Community College

The Ibrahim Sultan Polytechnic (Malay: Politeknik Ibrahim Sultan), Pasir Gudang Community College, Pasir Gudang Industrial Training Institute (Malay: Institut Latihan Perindustrian Pasir Gudang) and Johor Skills Development Centre (PUSPATRI) are the major higher institutes located at Pasir Gudang. Not only that, the “City of Knowledge”－Bandar Seri Alam houses a number of higher institutions including Universiti Teknologi Mara (UiTM) campus, Universiti Kuala Lumpur (UniKL) campus, the Masterskill University College of Health Sciences campus and other international schools. The Foon Yew High School second branch (Bandar Seri Alam Campus) and the Lee Chong Wei Badminton Academy are still construction.

== Infrastructure ==
=== Energy ===
It is the site of one of two major power stations in the state of Johor, the Sultan Iskandar Power Station.

=== Healthcare ===
There are 4 hospitals in the area which are KPJ Pasir Gudang Specialist Hospital, Hospital Penawar, Regency Specialist Hospital and the upcoming Pasir Gudang Hospital. The latter two are located in Seri Alam

== Tourist attraction ==
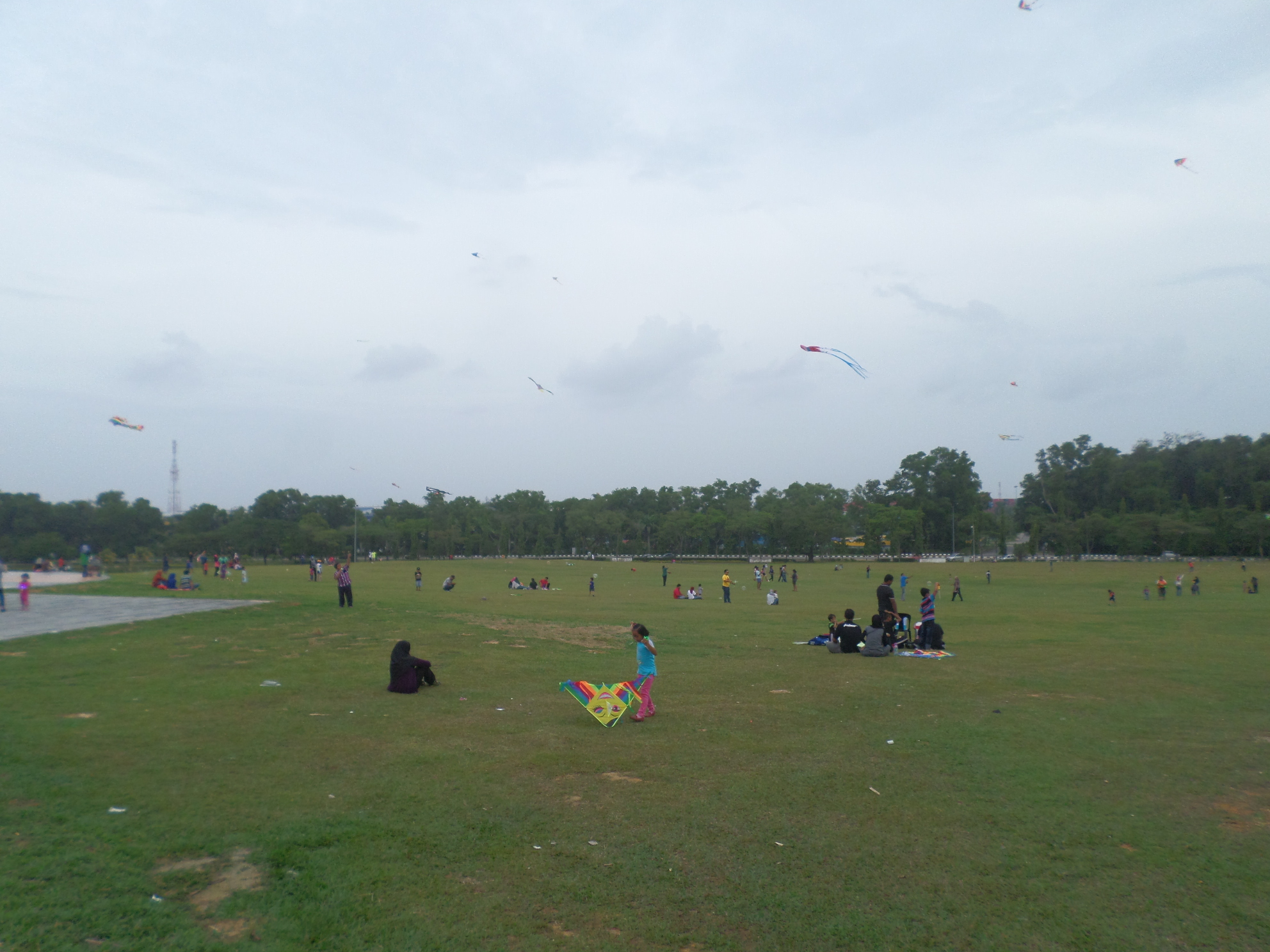
Kite Hill

Pasir Gudang Kite Museum is located here, on top of Kite Hill. It is the first kite museum in Malaysia and has a unique working windmill whose mechanism works to generate enough electricity to supply the daily needs of the museum. It also hosts the annual Pasir Gudang International Kite Festival since 1995.

== Sports ==
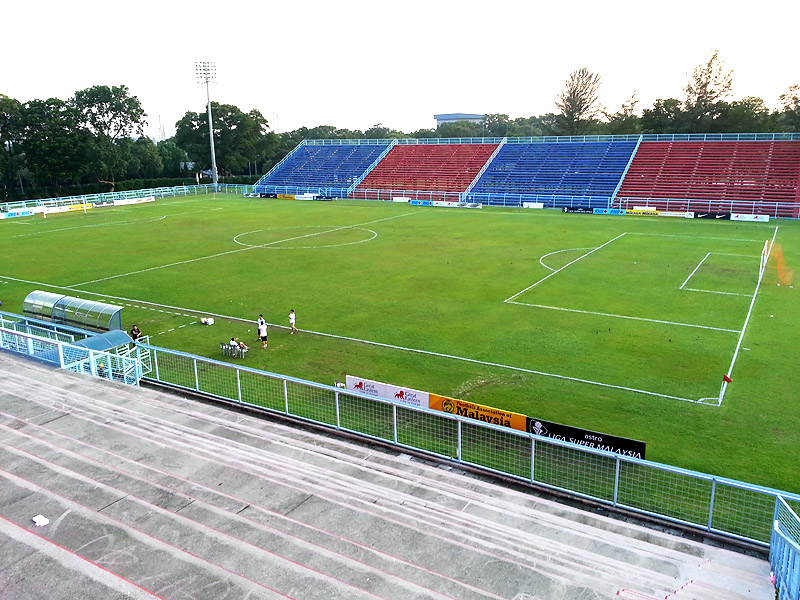
Pasir Gudang Corporation Stadium

Pasir Gudang Corporation Stadium is a multi-use stadium and it has both an indoor stadium within its compound. The outdoor stadium can hold a maximum of 15,000 people and is currently used mostly for football matches, serving as the home stadium to Johor in the Malaysia Premier League, President Cup, Malaysia and Harimau Muda B in the S. League.

The 3.86 km Johor Racing Circuit is located here, which formerly hosted one of the legs of the World Motorcycle Championship, being one of only two legs held in Asia.

Pasir Gudang has one golf course, the Tanjung Puteri Golf Resort. It has an area of 8.3 km^{2} and 3 courses named Plantation, Village and Straits.

== Transportation ==
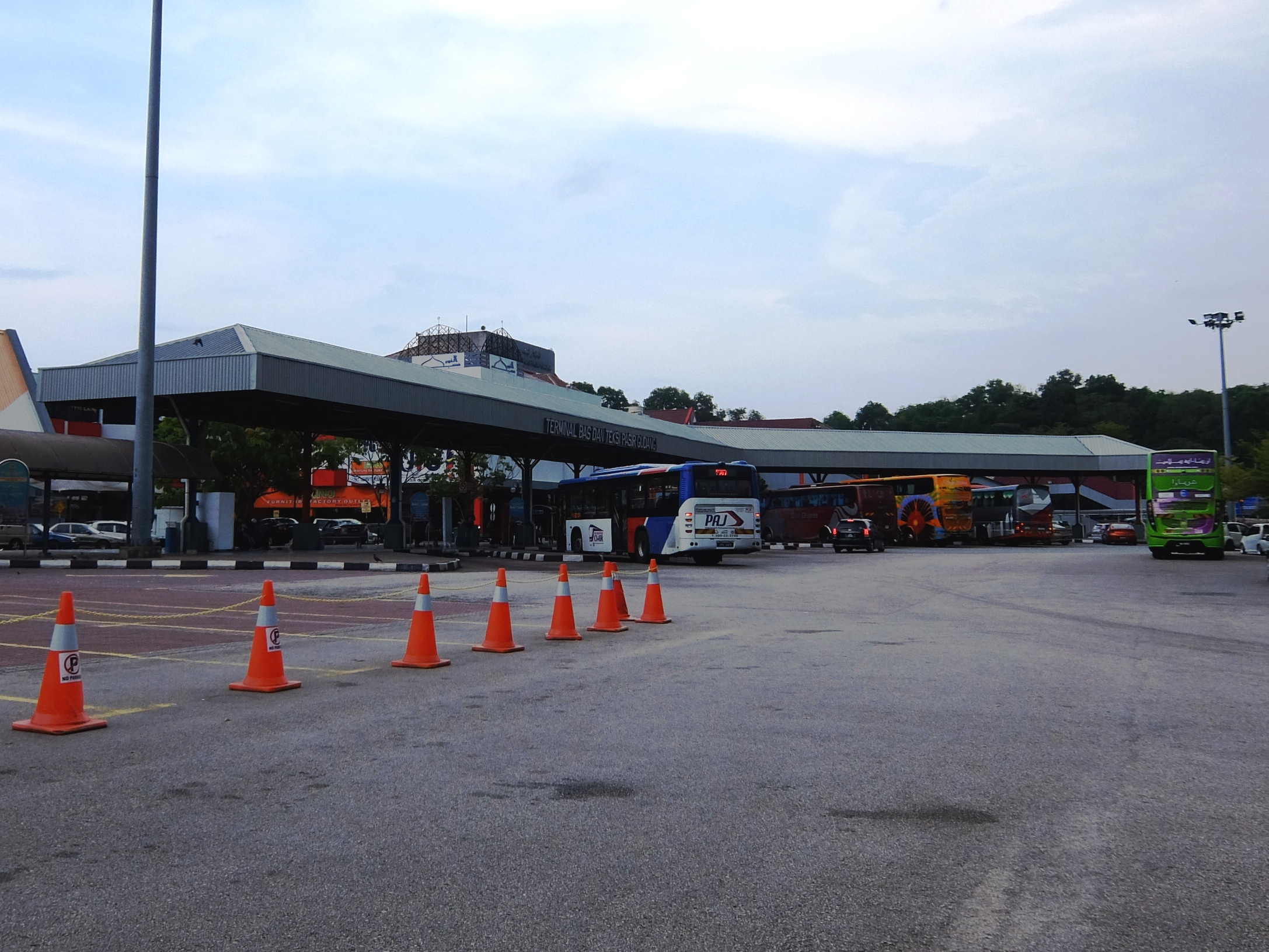
Pasir Gudang Bus and Taxi Terminal

=== Sea ===
The town consists of two ports, which are Tanjung Langsat Port and Johor Port. Johor Port is one of the country's most important seaports for commodities and mineral resources shipping, as Johor is home to a large number of major commercial plantations. The port is also the location of the majority of Malaysia's resources refineries.

The Pasir Gudang Ferry Terminal is also located in Pasir Gudang and has passenger ferry services to Batam in the Riau Islands Province of Indonesia.

=== Road ===
Pasir Gudang is connected by the 6-lane Federal Route 17 Pasir Gudang Highway, the 4-lane Johor Bahru East Coast Parkway, and a railway line to Kempas Bahru railway station. The Senai-Desaru Expressway also through here and the interchange was at Cahaya Baru and Pasir Gudang Highway. The public bus service also available here.

== See also ==
- Iskandar Puteri
