= List of BAS.MY bus routes =

List of bus routes funded by the Malaysian federal government

A T57 (now N57) route bus featuring the original blue and white myBAS livery, used during the initial phase of the SBST programme (2015–2024).

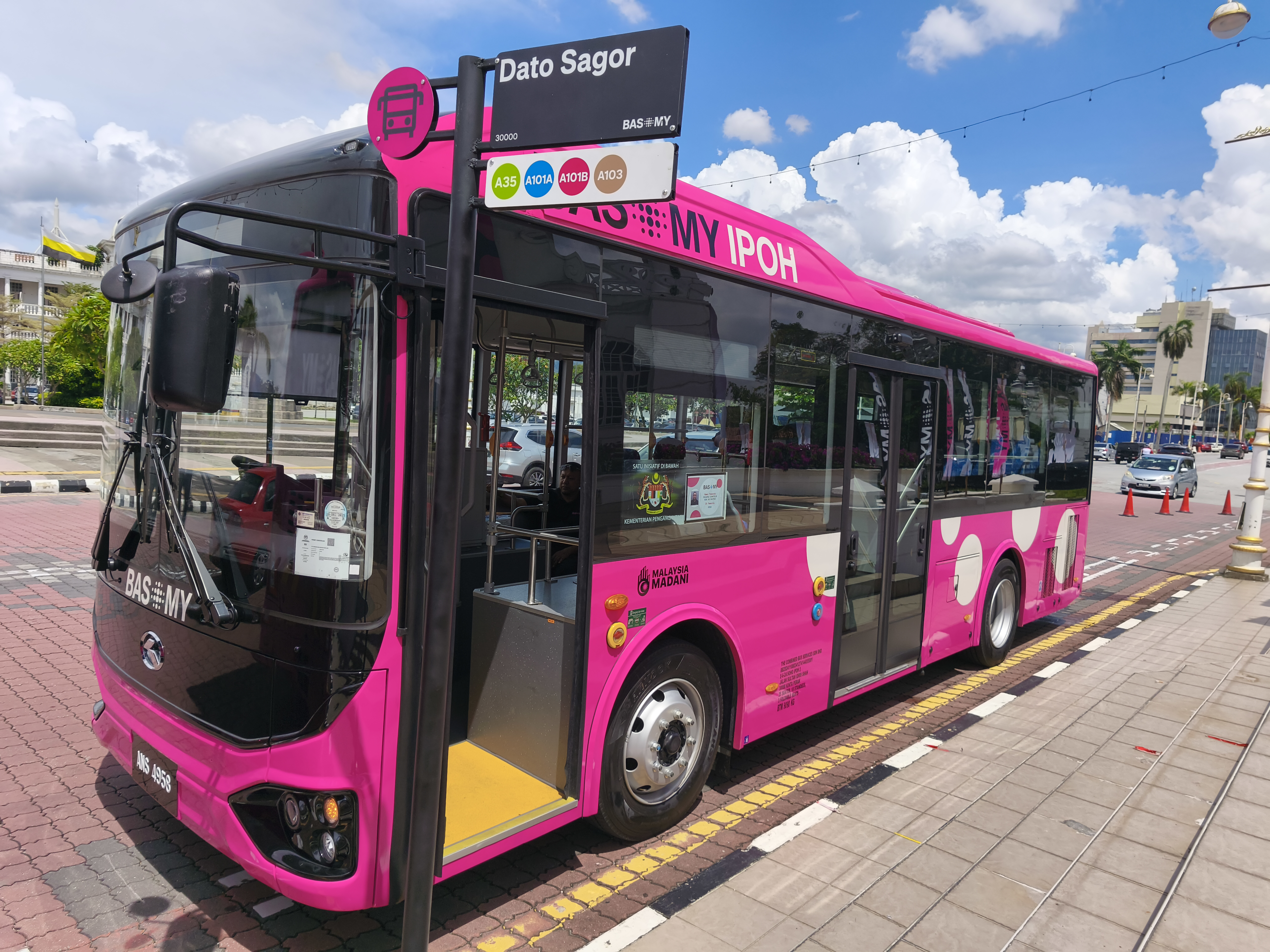
The revamped BAS.MY buses introduced in 2025 in Ipoh, painted in a distinctive pink livery. These newer units are equipped with disability-friendly facilities (OKU access) and real-time GPS tracking.

This is a list of the 166 BAS.MY bus routes funded by the federal government of Malaysia, under the auspices of the Ministry of Transport of Malaysia.

== BAS.MY Ipoh ==
Perak Transit operates 17 bus routes under the BAS.MY Ipoh programme, connecting Ipoh to its suburbs and surrounding towns.

Route number	Origin	Destination	Service type	Operator	Notes
A30A	Medan Kidd Bus Terminal	Amanjaya Bus Terminal (Bandar Meru Raya)	Trunk	Perak Transit	
A30B	Medan Kidd Bus Terminal	Chemor	Trunk	Perak Transit	Serves Amanjaya Bus Terminal (Bandar Meru Raya) in both directions.
A31A	Medan Kidd Bus Terminal	Kuala Kangsar Bus Terminal	Trunk	Perak Transit	
A31B	Medan Kidd Bus Terminal	Kuala Kangsar Bus Terminal	Trunk	Perak Transit	
A31X	Medan Kidd Bus Terminal	Kanthan	Trunk	Perak Transit	
A32	Medan Kidd Bus Terminal	Tanjong Rambutan	Trunk	Perak Transit	
A33A	Medan Kidd Bus Terminal	Chemor	Trunk	Perak Transit	
A33B	Medan Kidd Bus Terminal	Tanjong Rambutan	Trunk	Perak Transit	
A34	Medan Kidd Bus Terminal	Terminal 1 Kampar Bus Terminal	Trunk	Perak Transit	Serves Gopeng Bus Terminal in both directions.
A35	Medan Kidd Bus Terminal	Pengkalan Sentosa	Trunk	Perak Transit	Serves AEON Mall Ipoh Station 18 in both directions.
A36	Medan Kidd Bus Terminal	Universiti Teknologi MARA (Seri Iskandar campus)	Trunk	Perak Transit	Serves AEON Ipoh Falim and Universiti Teknologi Petronas in both directions.
A37	Medan Kidd Bus Terminal	Taman Botani (Bandar Seri Botani)	Trunk	Perak Transit	Serves Sultan Azlan Shah Airport in both directions.
A100	Medan Kidd Bus Terminal	Ipoh City Centre	Feeder	Perak Transit	Loop service.
A101A	Medan Kidd Bus Terminal	Bercham	Feeder	Perak Transit	Loop service.
A101B	Medan Kidd Bus Terminal	Bercham	Feeder	Perak Transit	Loop service.
A102	Medan Kidd Bus Terminal	Buntong	Feeder	Perak Transit	Loop service.
A103	Medan Kidd Bus Terminal	Ampang	Feeder	Perak Transit	Loop service.

== BAS.MY Johor Bahru ==
A BAS.MY Johor Bahru J15 bus at JB Sentral.

Handal Indah and its subcontractor operate a total of 21 bus routes under the BAS.MY Johor Bahru programme, connecting Johor Bahru to its suburbs and surrounding towns.

Route number	Origin	Destination	Service type	Operator	Notes
J10	JB Sentral Bus Terminal	Kota Tinggi Bus Terminal	Trunk	Handal Indah	Serves Tebrau (IKEA branch) / Toppen Bus Terminal and Ulu Tiram Bus Terminal in both directions.
J11	JB Sentral Bus Terminal	AEON Mall Bandar Dato' Onn	Trunk	Handal Indah	Serves Kangkar Tebrau in both directions.
J13	JB Sentral Bus Terminal	Larkin Sentral Bus Terminal	Trunk	Handal Indah	
J15	JB Sentral Bus Terminal	Mid Valley Southkey	Trunk	Handal Indah	
J16	B5 Johor Street Market / Angsana Mall	Tebrau (IKEA branch) / Toppen Bus Terminal	Trunk	Handal Indah	Serves Larkin Sentral Bus Terminal in both directions.
J20	JB Sentral Bus Terminal	Masai Bus Terminal	Trunk	Handal Indah	
J21	JB Sentral Bus Terminal	Permas Jaya Bus Terminal	Trunk	Handal Indah	Serves Jalan Permas 13 in both directions.
J22	JB Sentral Bus Terminal	Taman Scientex, Pasir Gudang	Trunk	Handal Indah	Serves Pasir Gudang Bus Terminal in both directions.
J30	JB Sentral Bus Terminal	Kulai Bus Terminal	Trunk	Handal Indah	Selected trips make an additional stop at KTM Kulai station in both directions.
J31	JB Sentral Bus Terminal	Taman Pulai Mutiara	Trunk	Handal Indah	Serves Taman Universiti Bus Terminal in both directions.
J32	JB Sentral Bus Terminal	Taman Selesa Jaya	Trunk	Transit Link (Johor Bahru) (Note: Operates the route as a subcontractor on behalf of Handal Indah.)	
J33	JB Sentral Bus Terminal	Taman Tan Sri Yaacob	Trunk	Handal Indah	Serves Taman Bukit Indah
J34	JB Sentral Bus Terminal	Sutera Mall Bus Terminal	Trunk	Handal Indah	Serves the main entrance of Sutera Mall in both directions.
J40	Larkin Sentral Bus Terminal	Gelang Patah Sentral Bus Terminal	Trunk	Handal Indah	Serves Gelang Patah Bus Terminal in both directions.
J42	Gelang Patah Bus Terminal	Kampung Pendas Baru	Trunk	Handal Indah	Serves Port of Tanjung Pelepas in both directions.
J44	Larkin Sentral Bus Terminal	Puteri Harbour Ferry Terminal	Trunk	Handal Indah	
J50	Larkin Sentral Bus Terminal	Pontian Bus Terminal	Trunk	Transit Link (Johor Bahru)	
J100	JB Sentral Bus Terminal	KSL City Mall	Feeder	Handal Indah	Loop service.
J200	Masai Bus Terminal	Seri Alam	Feeder	Handal Indah	Loop service.
J205	Masai Bus Terminal	Kota Masai (Lotus's branch)	Feeder	Handal Indah	Serves Pasir Gudang Bus Terminal in both directions.
J300	Kulai Bus Terminal	Putri Kulai Bus Terminal	Feeder	Handal Indah	Selected trips make an additional stop at KTM Kulai station in both directions.

=== Proposed changes for 2027 ===
An expansion of BAS.MY Johor Bahru was announced on 8 October 2026 as part of the programme's planned continuation from 2027 to 2031. The following proposed routes and revisions were displayed at the launch. Frequencies and daily trip totals are those shown on the display, rather than confirmed operating timetables.

Route	Proposed origin	Proposed destination	Intermediate location	Proposed frequency (minutes)	Proposed daily trips	Change
J10	JB Sentral	Kota Tinggi Bus Terminal	Larkin Sentral	30	76	Proposed route amendment to ply via Larkin Sentral.
J15	JB Sentral	AEON Mall Bandar Dato' Onn	Mid Valley Southkey	20	116	Proposed route extension beyond Mid Valley Southkey.
J17	JB Sentral	Ulu Tiram Bus Terminal	—	30	81	New route.
J45	JB Sentral	Mall of Medini	Larkin Sentral	30	72	New route.
J101	Pasar Borong Pandan	AEON Mall Bandar Dato' Onn	—	30	80	New route.
J301	Terminal Taman U	Paradigm Mall	Universiti Teknologi Malaysia	20	110	New route.

As part of the changes, existing routes J11 and J44 are proposed to be discontinued.

== BAS.MY Kangar ==
Maraliner operates nine bus routes under the BAS.MY Kangar programme, connecting Kangar to its suburbs and surrounding towns.

Route number	Origin	Destination	Service type	Operator	Notes
R10	Bukit Lagi Bus Terminal	Changlun Bus Terminal	Trunk	Maraliner	Serves Arau Bus Terminal (for KTM Arau Royal station) in both directions.
R11	Bukit Lagi Bus Terminal	Padang Besar Bus Terminal	Trunk	Maraliner	Serves Kaki Bukit Health Clinic in both directions.
R12	Bukit Lagi Bus Terminal	Kampung Seberang Ramai (Kuala Perlis)	Trunk	Maraliner	Serves Kuala Perlis Bus Terminal in both directions.
R13	Bukit Lagi Bus Terminal	Shahab Pedana Bus Terminal	Trunk	Maraliner	Serves Kuala Sanglang in both directions.
R14	Bukit Lagi Bus Terminal	Shahab Pedana Bus Terminal	Trunk	Maraliner	Serves Arau Bus Terminal (for KTM Arau Royal station), Alor Setar Hospital and Darul Aman Stadium in both directions.
R15	Shahab Pedana Bus Terminal	Universiti Utara Malaysia (Sintok)	Trunk	Maraliner	Serves Changlun Bus Terminal in both directions.
R102	Bukit Lagi Bus Terminal	Perumahan Kilang Gula (Chuping)	Feeder	Maraliner	
R104	Bukit Lagi Bus Terminal	Masjid Nurul Huda (Felda Chuping)	Feeder	Maraliner	
R105	KTM Padang Besar station	Kaki Bukit Health Clinic	Feeder	Maraliner	Serves Padang Besar Bus Terminal in both directions.

== BAS.MY Kota Bharu ==
Konsortium E-Mutiara operates 16 bus routes under the BAS.MY Kota Bharu programme, connecting Kota Bharu to its suburbs and surrounding towns.

Route number	Origin	Destination	Service type	Operator	Notes
D10	Kota Bharu Bus Station	Pengkalan Chepa	Trunk	Konsortium E-Mutiara	Serves Taman Kurnia Jaya in both directions.
D11	Kota Bharu Bus Station	Sabak	Trunk	Konsortium E-Mutiara	
D12	Kota Bharu Bus Station	Sabak	Trunk	Konsortium E-Mutiara	Serves Sultan Ismail Petra Airport in both directions.
D13	Kota Bharu Bus Station	Pantai Cahaya Bulan	Trunk	Konsortium E-Mutiara	Serves Muhammadi Mosque in both directions.
D20	Kota Bharu Bus Station	Pengkalan Kubor Bus Terminal	Trunk	Konsortium E-Mutiara	
D21	Kota Bharu Bus Station	Pengkalan Kubor Bus Terminal	Trunk	Konsortium E-Mutiara	Serves Pekan Tumpat (KTM Tumpat station) in both directions.
D30	Kota Bharu Bus Station	Pasir Mas Bus Terminal	Trunk	Konsortium E-Mutiara	Serves KTM Pasir Mas station in both directions.
D31	Kota Bharu Bus Station	Pasir Mas Bus Terminal	Trunk	Konsortium E-Mutiara	Serves KTM Pasir Mas station in both directions.
D32	Kota Bharu Bus Station	Rantau Panjang Temporary Bus Station	Trunk	Konsortium E-Mutiara	Serves KTM Pasir Mas station, Pasir Mas Bus Terminal and Rantau Panjang Bus Terminal in both directions.
D40	Kota Bharu Bus Station	Jeli Bus Terminal	Trunk	Konsortium E-Mutiara	Serves KTM Pasir Mas station, Tanah Merah Bus Terminal and KTM Tanah Merah station in both directions.
D50	Kota Bharu Bus Station	Bachok Bus Terminal	Trunk	Konsortium E-Mutiara	Serves Universiti Malaysia Kelantan in both directions.
D51	Kota Bharu Bus Station	Jerteh Bus Terminal	Trunk	Konsortium E-Mutiara	Serves Pasir Puteh Bus Terminal in both directions.
D52	Kota Bharu Bus Station	Besut Polyclinic	Trunk	Konsortium E-Mutiara	Serves Kuala Besut Bus Terminal and Kampung Raja in both directions.
D60	Kota Bharu Bus Station	Kuala Krai Bus Terminal (KTM Kuala Krai station)	Trunk	Konsortium E-Mutiara	Serves Ketereh Bus Station, Kok Lanas Bus Terminal and Machang Bus Terminal in both directions.
D61	Kota Bharu Bus Station	Universiti Teknologi MARA (Machang campus)	Trunk	Konsortium E-Mutiara	Serves Ketereh Bus Station, Kok Lanas Bus Terminal, Kelantan Maticulation College, Kota Bharu Polyclinic and Machang Bus Terminal in both directions.
D62	Kota Bharu Bus Station	Hentian Gua Musang	Trunk	Konsortium E-Mutiara	Serves Ketereh Bus Station, Kok Lanas Bus Terminal, Machang Bus Terminal, Kuala Krai Bus Terminal (for KTM Kuala Krai station) and Gua Musang Bus Terminal in both directions.

== BAS.MY Kota Kinabalu ==
Jaguh Bayu, a subsidiary of HI Mobility Berhad, the parent company of Handal Indah, announced that it plans to operate eight bus routes under the BAS.MY Kota Kinabalu programme, connecting Kota Kinabalu to its suburbs and surrounding towns. As of 11 August 2026, all eight routes are in operation.

Route number	Origin	Destination	Service type	Operator	Notes
S01	KK Sentral Bus Terminal	1Borneo Hypermall	Trunk	Jaguh Bayu	Loop service.
S02	KK Sentral Bus Terminal	1Borneo Hypermall	Trunk	Jaguh Bayu	Loop service.
S03	Menggatal Bus Terminal	KK Sentral Bus Terminal	Trunk	Jaguh Bayu	Loop service.
S04	Menggatal Bus Terminal	KK Sentral Bus Terminal	Trunk	Jaguh Bayu	Loop service.
S05	KK Sentral Bus Terminal	Sabah Trade Centre	Trunk	Jaguh Bayu	Loop service.
S06	KK Sentral Bus Terminal	Sembulan railway station	Trunk	Jaguh Bayu	Loop service.
S07	KK Sentral Bus Terminal	Kota Kinabalu International Airport	Trunk	Jaguh Bayu	Loop service.
S08	KK Sentral Bus Terminal	Kota Kinabalu International Airport	Trunk	Jaguh Bayu	Loop service.

== BAS.MY Kota Setar ==
Gopi Travel Tours operates 13 bus routes under the BAS.MY Kota Setar programme, connecting Alor Setar and Sungai Petani to their suburbs and surrounding towns.

Route number	Origin	Destination	Service type	Operator	Notes
K10	Shahab Pedana Bus Terminal	Kuala Kedah	Trunk	Gopi Travel Tours	Serves Pekan Rabu in both directions.
K20	Shahab Pedana Bus Terminal	Jitra Bus Terminal	Trunk	Gopi Travel Tours	Serves Pekan Rabu, Darul Aman Stadium and Sultan Abdul Halim Airport in both directions.
K30	Shahab Pedana Bus Terminal	Kuala Nerang Bus Terminal	Trunk	Gopi Travel Tours	Serves Pekan Rabu in both directions.
K40	Shahab Pedana Bus Terminal	Pendang Bus Terminal	Trunk	Gopi Travel Tours	Serves Pekan Rabu in both directions.
K41	Shahab Pedana Bus Terminal	Pendang Bus Terminal	Trunk	Gopi Travel Tours	Serves Pekan Rabu in both directions.
K50	Shahab Pedana Bus Terminal	Sungai Petani Bus Station	Trunk	Gopi Travel Tours	Serves Pekan Rabu in both directions.
K51	Sungai Petani Bus Station	Tanjung Dawai	Trunk	Gopi Travel Tours	
K52	Sungai Petani Bus Station	Pantai Merdeka	Trunk	Gopi Travel Tours	
K60	Sungai Petani Bus Station	Sungai Lalang Health Clinic (Taman Bandar Baru)	Trunk	Gopi Travel Tours	
K61	Sungai Petani Bus Station	Taman Kelisa Ria	Trunk	Gopi Travel Tours	
K62	Sungai Petani Bus Station	Taman Batik (Mydin branch)	Trunk	Gopi Travel Tours	
K63	Sungai Petani Bus Station	Bandar Perdana	Trunk	Gopi Travel Tours	
K100	Shahab Pedana Bus Terminal	Alor Setar City Centre	Feeder	Gopi Travel Tours	Operates clockwise and counter-clockwise loop service variants.

== BAS.MY Kuala Terengganu ==
Maraliner operates nine bus routes under the BAS.MY Kuala Terengganu programme, connecting Kuala Terengganu to its suburbs and surrounding towns.

Route number	Origin	Destination	Service type	Operator	Notes
T10	Kuala Terengganu Bus Terminal	Merang Jetty Bus Terminal	Trunk	Maraliner	Serves Sultan Mahmud Airport in both directions.
T11A	Kuala Terengganu Bus Terminal	Batu Rakit Bus Terminal	Trunk	Maraliner	Serves Universiti Sultan Zainal Abidin in both directions. Operates during mornings only.
T11B	Kuala Terengganu Bus Terminal	Batu Rakit Bus Terminal	Trunk	Maraliner	Serves Universiti Sultan Zainal Abidin in both directions. Operates during afternoons and evenings only.
T20	Kuala Terengganu Bus Terminal	Bukit Payong Bus Terminal	Trunk	Maraliner	
T21	Kuala Terengganu Bus Terminal	Bukit Payong Bus Terminal	Trunk	Maraliner	Serves Islamic Heritage Park in both directions.
T22	Kuala Terengganu Bus Terminal	Kuala Berang Bus Terminal	Trunk	Maraliner	
T30	Kuala Terengganu Bus Terminal	Marang Bus Terminal	Trunk	Maraliner	
T31	Kuala Terengganu Bus Terminal	Marang Bus Terminal	Trunk	Maraliner	Serves Marang Jetty in both directions.
T100	Kuala Terengganu Bus Terminal	Kuala Terengganu City Centre	Feeder	Maraliner	Loop service.

== BAS.MY Kuantan ==
Sanwa Tours operates 16 bus routes under the BAS.MY Kuantan programme, connecting Kuantan to its suburbs and surrounding towns.

Route number	Origin	Destination	Service type	Operator	Notes
C10	Hentian Bandar (Bandar Kuantan Bus Terminal)	Taman Gambang Damai	Trunk	Sanwa Tours	Serves International Islamic University Malaysia (Gambang campus) in both directions.
C11	Hentian Bandar (Bandar Kuantan Bus Terminal)	Inderapura Jaya	Trunk	Sanwa Tours	Loop service.
C12	Hentian Bandar (Bandar Kuantan Bus Terminal)	Taman Bukit Rangin	Trunk	Sanwa Tours	Loop service.
C20	Hentian Bandar (Bandar Kuantan Bus Terminal)	Teluk Cempedak Bus Terminal	Trunk	Sanwa Tours	
C30	Hentian Bandar (Bandar Kuantan Bus Terminal)	Taman Impian	Trunk	Sanwa Tours	Serves Kuantan Courthouse in both directions.
C31	Hentian Bandar (Bandar Kuantan Bus Terminal)	Felda Bukit Sagu	Trunk	Sanwa Tours	Serves Felda Bukit Goh in both directions.
C32	Hentian Bandar (Bandar Kuantan Bus Terminal)	Indera Mahkota Bus Terminal	Trunk	Sanwa Tours	Serves Taman Cenderawasih in both directions.
C33	Hentian Bandar (Bandar Kuantan Bus Terminal)	Terminal Sentral Kuantan	Trunk	Sanwa Tours	Serves International Islamic University Malaysia (Kuantan campus) in both directions.
C40	Hentian Bandar (Bandar Kuantan Bus Terminal)	Pekan Bus Terminal	Trunk	Sanwa Tours	
C41	Hentian Bandar (Bandar Kuantan Bus Terminal)	Kuala Pahang Bus Terminal	Trunk	Sanwa Tours	
C42	Hentian Bandar (Bandar Kuantan Bus Terminal)	SMK Sungai Soi	Trunk	Sanwa Tours	Serves Taman Kuantan Jaya in both directions.
C50	Hentian Bandar (Bandar Kuantan Bus Terminal)	Sungai Lembing Bus Terminal	Trunk	Sanwa Tours	
C60	Hentian Bandar (Bandar Kuantan Bus Terminal)	Balok Makmur	Trunk	Sanwa Tours	
C61	Hentian Bandar (Bandar Kuantan Bus Terminal)	Politeknik Sultan Haji Ahmad Shah (POLISAS)	Trunk	Sanwa Tours	
C64	Balok Makmur	Bandar Baru Chendor Bus Terminal (Cherating)	Trunk	Sanwa Tours	
C100	Hentian Bandar (Bandar Kuantan Bus Terminal)	Kuantan City Centre	Feeder	Sanwa Tours	Loop service.

== BAS.MY Kuching ==
Biaramas Express operates 13 bus routes under the BAS.MY Kuching programme, connecting Kuching to its suburbs and surrounding towns.

Route number	Origin	Destination	Service type	Operator	Notes
Q01	Open Air Market Bus Terminal	Taman Malihah	Trunk	Biaramas Express	
Q05	Saujana Bus Terminal	SMK Agama Matang 2	Trunk	Biaramas Express	
Q06	Saujana Bus Terminal	Kampung Benuk	Trunk	Biaramas Express	
Q07	Saujana Bus Terminal	Batu Kawa	Trunk	Biaramas Express	
Q08	Open Air Market Bus Terminal	Bau Bus Terminal	Trunk	Biaramas Express	
Q09	Open Air Market Bus Terminal	Muara Tebas Bus Terminal	Trunk	Biaramas Express	Serves Bako Bus Terminal in both directions.
Q10	Open Air Market Bus Terminal	Serian Bus Terminal	Trunk	Biaramas Express	Serves Pusat Jantung Sarawak and Universiti Malaysia Sarawak in both directions.
Q11	Saujana Bus Terminal	Arang Road	Trunk	Biaramas Express	Loop service.
Q12	Saujana Bus Terminal	Taman Hui Sing	Trunk	Biaramas Express	Loop service.
Q13	Open Air Market Bus Terminal	Siburan	Trunk	Biaramas Express	
Q14	Open Air Market Bus Terminal	Summer Mall Bus Terminal	Trunk	Biaramas Express	
Q15	Kuching Sentral Bus Terminal	Saujana Bus Terminal	Trunk	Biaramas Express	Loop service.
Q16	Open Air Market Bus Terminal	Taman Sukma	Trunk	Biaramas Express	Loop service.

== BAS.MY Melaka ==
Handal Indah and its subcontractor operate a total of 22 bus routes under the BAS.MY Melaka programme, connecting Malacca City to its suburbs and surrounding towns.

Route number	Origin	Destination	Service type	Operator	Notes
M10A	Melaka Sentral Bus Terminal	Malacca International Trade Centre (MITC) or Universiti Teknikal Malaysia Melaka (UTeM)	Trunk	Handal Indah	Terminates at MITC from Mondays to Thursdays; route extends to terminate at UTeM from Fridays to Sundays.
M10B	Melaka Sentral Bus Terminal	Malacca International Trade Centre (MITC)	Trunk	Handal Indah	
M11	Melaka Sentral Bus Terminal	Bukit Katil Damai	Trunk	Handal Indah	
M12	Melaka Sentral Bus Terminal	Malacca Airport	Trunk	Handal Indah	
M13	Melaka Sentral Bus Terminal	Taman Inang Sari	Trunk	Handal Indah	
M14	Melaka Sentral Bus Terminal	Tanjung Minyak Perdana	Trunk	Handal Indah	
M15	Melaka Sentral Bus Terminal	Taman Bertam Perdana (Pulau Gadong)	Trunk	Handal Indah	
M16	Melaka Sentral Bus Terminal	PPR Taman Tangga Batu Perdana (Paya Luboh)	Trunk	Handal Indah	
M17	Melaka Sentral Bus Terminal	Tangga Batu Health Clinic	Trunk	Handal Indah	
M20	Melaka Sentral Bus Terminal	Pulau Sebang Sentral Bus Terminal (Tampin)	Trunk	Handal Indah	Serves Alor Gajah Sentral Bus Terminal in both directions.
M20X	Alor Gajah Sentral Bus Terminal	Melaka Sentral Bus Terminal	Trunk	Handal Indah	
M21	Melaka Sentral Bus Terminal	Pulau Sebang Sentral Bus Terminal (Tampin)	Trunk	Handal Indah	Serves Alor Gajah Sentral Bus Terminal in both directions.
M21X	Alor Gajah Sentral Bus Terminal	Melaka Sentral Bus Terminal	Trunk	Handal Indah	
M22	Melaka Sentral Bus Terminal	Bandar Vendor or University of Kuala Lumpur (UniKL)	Trunk	Maraliner (Note: Operates the route as a subcontractor on behalf of Handal Indah.)	Serves Alor Gajah Sentral Bus Terminal in both directions. Terminates at Bandar Vendor from Mondays to Thursdays; route extends to terminate at UniKL from Fridays to Sundays.
M23	Melaka Sentral Bus Terminal	Pengkalan Balak Beach	Trunk	Handal Indah (Note: Formerly operated by Panorama Melaka until 30 December 2024.)	Serves Masjid Tanah Sentral Bus Terminal in both directions.
M23X	Masjid Tanah Sentral Bus Terminal	Melaka Sentral Bus Terminal	Trunk	Handal Indah	
M30	Melaka Sentral Bus Terminal	Batang Melaka Bus Terminal	Trunk	Handal Indah	Serves Machap Baru in both directions.
M31	Melaka Sentral Bus Terminal	Batang Melaka Bus Terminal	Trunk	Handal Indah	Serves Machap Baru in both directions.
M32	Melaka Sentral Bus Terminal	Jasin Sentral Bus Terminal	Trunk	Handal Indah	
M33	Jasin Sentral Bus Terminal	Taman Seri Asahan	Trunk	Handal Indah	Serves Kampung Baru Parit Keliling (Simpang Bekoh) in both directions.
M100	Melaka Sentral Bus Terminal	Malacca City Centre	Feeder	Handal Indah	Loop service.
M101	Melaka Sentral Bus Terminal	Pasar Melaka	Feeder	Handal Indah	Loop service.

== BAS.MY Seremban ==
Gopi Travel Tours and KR Travel & Tours, as well as their respective subcontractors, operate a total of 22 bus routes under the BAS.MY Seremban programme, connecting Seremban to its suburbs and surrounding towns.

Route number	Origin	Destination	Service type	Operator	Notes
N10A	Terminal 1 Seremban Bus Terminal	Bahau Bus Terminal	Trunk	Unitedbas (Note: Operates the route as a subcontractor on behalf of Gopi Travel Tours.)	Serves Kuala Pilah Bus Terminal in both directions.
N10B	Terminal 1 Seremban Bus Terminal	Bahau Bus Terminal	Trunk	Unitedbas	Serves Kuala Pilah Bus Terminal in both directions.
N11	Kuala Pilah (Giant branch)	Universiti Teknologi MARA (Beting campus)	Trunk	Gopi Travel Tours	Serves Kuala Pilah Bus Terminal in both directions.
N30A	Terminal 1 Seremban Bus Terminal	Port Dickson Bus Terminal	Trunk	Gopi Travel Tours	
N30B	Terminal 1 Seremban Bus Terminal	Port Dickson Bus Terminal	Trunk	Gopi Travel Tours	
N31	Terminal 1 Seremban Bus Terminal	Pengkalan Kempas Bus Terminal	Trunk	Gopi Travel Tours	
N32	Port Dickson Bus Terminal	Polymall (Teluk Kemang)	Trunk	Gopi Travel Tours	
N34	Polymall (Teluk Kemang)	Kolej Uniti Port Dickson (Pasir Panjang)	Trunk	Gopi Travel Tours	
N50	Terminal 1 Seremban Bus Terminal	Nilai Sentral Bus Terminal	Trunk	KR Travel & Tours	
N51	Nilai Sentral Bus Terminal	Desaria (Nilai 3)	Trunk	KR Travel & Tours	
N52	Terminal 1 Seremban Bus Terminal	Nilai Sentral Bus Terminal	Trunk	KR Travel & Tours	
N53	Terminal 1 Seremban Bus Terminal	Port Dickson Bus Terminal	Trunk	Gopi Travel Tours	
N54	Terminal 1 Seremban Bus Terminal	Seremban 2	Trunk	KR Travel & Tours	
N56	Terminal 1 Seremban Bus Terminal	Kampung LBJ	Trunk	KR Travel & Tours	
N57	Nilai Sentral Bus Terminal	Kuala Lumpur International Airport (KLIA) Terminal 2	Trunk	KR Travel & Tours	Serves KLIA Terminal 1 in both directions.
N60A	Terminal 1 Seremban Bus Terminal	Pulau Sebang Sentral Bus Terminal (Tampin)	Trunk	Southern Omnibus (Note: Operates the route as a subcontractor on behalf of KR Travel & Tours.)	Serves Rembau Bus Terminal in both directions.
N60B	Terminal 1 Seremban Bus Terminal	Pulau Sebang Sentral Bus Terminal (Tampin)	Trunk	Southern Omnibus	Serves Rembau Bus Terminal in both directions.
N70	Terminal 1 Seremban Bus Terminal	Titi	Trunk	Gopi Travel Tours	Serves Kuala Klawang Bus Terminal in both directions.
N71	Kuala Klawang Bus Terminal	Kampung Chennah	Trunk	Gopi Travel Tours	
N505	Terminal 1 Seremban Bus Terminal	Bukit Mutiara	Feeder	KR Travel & Tours	Loop service.
N508	Terminal 1 Seremban Bus Terminal	Taman Desa Rhu	Feeder	KR Travel & Tours	Loop service.
N513	Nilai Sentral Bus Terminal	Universiti Sains Islam Malaysia	Feeder	KR Travel & Tours	Loop service.

== See also ==
- List of bus routes in Johor Bahru
