= Bandar Seri =

Bandar Seri or Bandar Sri may refer to:

- Bandar Seri Alam, Mukim Plentong, Johor Bahru District, Johor, Malaysia
- Bandar Seri Bandi, a small town in Kemaman District, Terengganu, Malaysia
- Bandar Seri Begawan, capital of Brunei
- Bandar Seri Botani, a new township in Ipoh, Perak, Malaysia
- Bandar Seri Iskandar, a satellite town of Seri Iskandar, Perak Tengah District, Perak, Malaysia
- Bandar Seri Jempol, town and planned capital of Jempol District, Negeri Sembilan, Malaysia
- Bandar Sri Permaisuri, a township in Cheras, Kuala Lumpur, Malaysia
- Bandar Seri Putra, a township in Bangi, Hulu Langat District, Selangor, Malaysia
- Bandar Sri Sendayan, a planned township in Rantau, Seremban District, Negeri Sembilan, Malaysia
