= Perak Transit =

Public bus operator in Perak, Malaysia

Perak Transit Berhad
- Type: Public Company
- Industry: Public Transport Operator
- Founded: 2008
- Headquarters: E-6-2A, SOHO Ipoh 2 Jalan Sultan Idris Shah 30000 Ipoh, Perak, Malaysia., Malaysia
- Area served: Ipoh, Kampar, Teluk Intan, Kuala Kangsar, Seri Manjung, Tapah, Bidor
- Key people: Cheong Kong Fitt (Managing Director)
- Services: Bus service
- Website: peraktransit.com.my

Perak Transit Berhad is a major bus operator company in the state of Perak, Malaysia. They are currently the largest bus operator as well as the operator and developer of some bus terminals in the state such as Meru Raya Terminal, Kampar Putra Terminal and Bidor Sentral.

== History ==
Perak Transit was founded by Cheong Kong Fitt, the leader of The Combined Bus Services (Partnership) which was the company that operates Medan Kidd bus terminal in 2008. Cheong was instrumental to merge the bus services operations of The General Omnibus Company (Perak) Sdn Bhd, Ipoh Omnibus Company Sdn Bhd and The Kinta Omnibus Company Sdn Bhd, then were the major operators of Ipoh local buses, into one roof in the company. Perak Transit were effectively the largest operator in Ipoh since the merger.

The company was founded as a private limited company before changed status as a public company in 2010.

In 2012, the company successfully build Meru Raya Terminal (back then was named Amanjaya Terminal), which later become Ipoh's main express bus terminal today. The company also built Kampar Putra Sentral, the terminal and commercial complex in Kampar which opens in 2019, and later Bidor Sentral in 2024.

== Services ==
=== Current services ===
- Stage Bus Service Transformation routes, carrying BAS.MY brand in Ipoh region
- Stage buses carrying Perak Transit own branding in Kampar, Bidor, Teluk Intan and Kuala Kangsar
- Bas Perak Sejahtera, local services to towns in Sungai Siput, Tanjong Malim, Taiping and Bidor
- Perak Hop-On-Hop-Off charter service

=== Former services ===
- Bas Perak Sejahtera service in Seri Manjung (transferred over to Arwana)
- Express bus services to Cameron Highlands, Kuala Lumpur and Penang

== Bus routes ==
=== BAS.MY routes ===
Perak Transit operates 17 bus routes under the BAS.MY Ipoh programme, connecting Ipoh to its suburbs and surrounding towns.

Route number	Origin	Destination	Service type	Operator	Notes
A30A	Medan Kidd Bus Terminal	Amanjaya Bus Terminal (Bandar Meru Raya)	Trunk	Perak Transit	
A30B	Medan Kidd Bus Terminal	Chemor	Trunk	Perak Transit	Serves Amanjaya Bus Terminal (Bandar Meru Raya) in both directions.
A31A	Medan Kidd Bus Terminal	Kuala Kangsar Bus Terminal	Trunk	Perak Transit	
A31B	Medan Kidd Bus Terminal	Kuala Kangsar Bus Terminal	Trunk	Perak Transit	
A31X	Medan Kidd Bus Terminal	Kanthan	Trunk	Perak Transit	
A32	Medan Kidd Bus Terminal	Tanjong Rambutan	Trunk	Perak Transit	
A33A	Medan Kidd Bus Terminal	Chemor	Trunk	Perak Transit	
A33B	Medan Kidd Bus Terminal	Tanjong Rambutan	Trunk	Perak Transit	
A34	Medan Kidd Bus Terminal	Terminal 1 Kampar Bus Terminal	Trunk	Perak Transit	Serves Gopeng Bus Terminal in both directions.
A35	Medan Kidd Bus Terminal	Pengkalan Sentosa	Trunk	Perak Transit	Serves AEON Mall Ipoh Station 18 in both directions.
A36	Medan Kidd Bus Terminal	Universiti Teknologi MARA (Seri Iskandar campus)	Trunk	Perak Transit	Serves AEON Ipoh Falim and Universiti Teknologi Petronas in both directions.
A37	Medan Kidd Bus Terminal	Taman Botani (Bandar Seri Botani)	Trunk	Perak Transit	Serves Sultan Azlan Shah Airport in both directions.
A100	Medan Kidd Bus Terminal	Ipoh City Centre	Feeder	Perak Transit	Loop service.
A101A	Medan Kidd Bus Terminal	Bercham	Feeder	Perak Transit	Loop service.
A101B	Medan Kidd Bus Terminal	Bercham	Feeder	Perak Transit	Loop service.
A102	Medan Kidd Bus Terminal	Buntong	Feeder	Perak Transit	Loop service.
A103	Medan Kidd Bus Terminal	Ampang	Feeder	Perak Transit	Loop service.

=== Stage bus routes ===
Route number	Origin	Destination	Service type	Operator	Notes
22	Teluk Intan Bus Terminal	Terminal 1 Kampar Bus Terminal	Trunk	Perak Transit	
23	Teluk Intan Bus Terminal	Bidor Bus Station	Trunk	Perak Transit	
29	Bidor Bus Station	Kuala Bikam	Trunk	Perak Transit	
31	Terminal 1 Kampar Bus Terminal	Tapah Bus Terminal	Trunk	Perak Transit	Serves Chenderiang in both directions.
37	Medan Kidd Bus Terminal	Tanjung Tualang	Trunk	Perak Transit	
39	Medan Kidd Bus Terminal	Beruas Bus Terminal	Trunk	Perak Transit	Serves Parit Bus Terminal in both directions.
46	Medan Kidd Bus Terminal	Seri Manjung Bus Terminal	Trunk	Perak Transit	
69	Terminal 1 Kampar Bus Terminal	Malim Nawar	Trunk	Perak Transit	
70	Terminal 1 Kampar Bus Terminal	Sahom	Trunk	Perak Transit	
99A	Lenggong Bus Terminal	Kuala Kangsar Bus Terminal	Trunk	Perak Transit	Serves Kuala Kangsar town via Jalan Dato Sagor
99B	Lenggong Bus Terminal	Kuala Kangsar Bus Terminal	Trunk	Perak Transit	Serves Kuala Kangsar town via Jalan Sultan Nazrin Shah (Hospital stop)
99C	Lenggong Bus Terminal	Gerik Bus Terminal	Trunk	Perak Transit	
99D	Kampung Air Kala	Lenggong Bus Terminal	Trunk	Perak Transit	
100	Teluk Intan Bus Terminal	Tapah Bus Terminal	Trunk	Perak Transit	
101	Teluk Intan Bus Terminal	Sungai Besar	Trunk	Perak Transit	
102	Teluk Intan Bus Terminal	Kampung Gajah	Trunk	Perak Transit	
103	Teluk Intan Bus Terminal	Langkap	Trunk	Perak Transit	
188	Sungkai Bus Terminal	Tapah Bus Terminal	Trunk	Perak Transit	Serves Bidor Bus Station in both directions.
241	Sungai Siput	Simpang Perlop	Trunk	Perak Transit	
242	Sungai Siput	Simpang Jalong	Trunk	Perak Transit	

=== Bas Perak Sejahtera Routes ===
Route number	Origin	Destination	Service type	Operator	Notes
03	Taman Kamunting Mutiara	Kampung Boyan	Trunk	Perak Transit	Formerly Rapid Kamunting route RKM30
13	Kamunting Bus Terminal	Taiping Bus Terminal	Trunk	Perak Transit	Formerly part of Rapid Kamunting route RKM10
23	SK Sungai Siput	SMK Bawong	Trunk	Perak Transit	
33	SK Sungai Siput	Karai	Trunk	Perak Transit	
68	Chenderiang	Tapah Bus Terminal	Trunk	Perak Transit	
83	Kuala Kangsar Bus Terminal	Kati	Trunk	Perak Transit	
88	Kampung Poh	Bidor Sentral Bus Terminal	Trunk	Perak Transit	
118	Tanjong Malim Bus Terminal	Proton City	Trunk	Perak Transit	

=== Former bus routes ===
Route number	Origin	Destination	Service type	Operator	Notes
35	Medan Kidd Bus Terminal	Kuala Kangsar Bus Terminal	Trunk	Perak Transit	Succeed by BAS.MY Ipoh
47	Medan Kidd Bus Terminal	Kampung Bali	Trunk	Perak Transit	Serves Batu Gajah
66	Medan Kidd Bus Terminal	Terminal 1 Kampar Bus Terminal	Trunk	Perak Transit	Succeed by BAS.MY Ipoh
67	Gopeng	Batu Gajah	Trunk	Perak Transit	
68	Gopeng	Kota Bahru	Trunk	Perak Transit	Serves Lawan Kuda Baru
