= Asma Sultana =

Bangladeshi designer and fashion entrepreneur

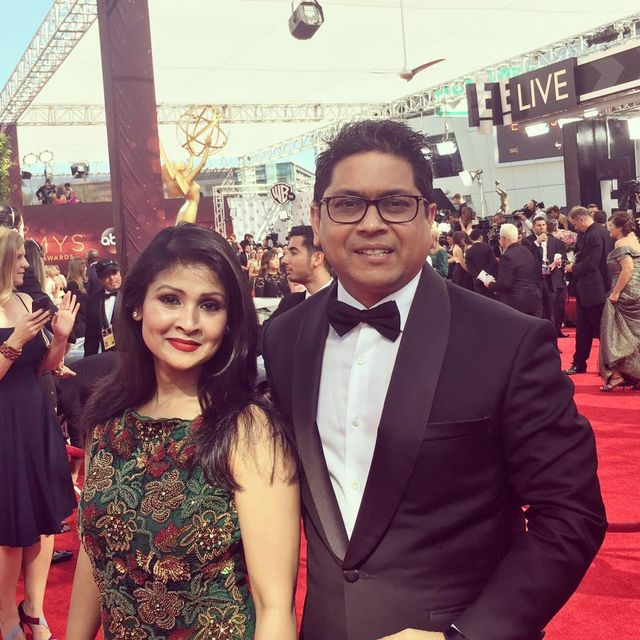
- Asma Sultana with her husband Tanjim Ashraful Haque
- Born: October 2, 1977 (age 48); Dhaka, Bangladesh
- Other name: Sultana A
- Occupation: Fashion designer
- Known for: Chief designer, Zoan Ash and ZarZain
- Spouse: Tanjim Ashraful Haque (m. 2000)
- Children: Zara Irvin Haque; Zaina Adeeva Haque; Zoana Amreen Haque
- Website: zoanash.com

Asma Sultana, also known as Sultana A (born October 2, 1977), is a Bangladeshi designer and fashion entrepreneur. She began her career in 1997 and is now expanding her line towards couture clothing. She and her husband Tanjim Ashraful Haque run the fashion retail company Ecstasy in Bangladesh, with the in-house brands Tanjim, ZarZain, and Zoan Ash.

== Fashion career ==
Sultana started ZarZain as an in-house brand in 2009 and has since expanded its lines into more diversified global, fusion and desi wear. She developed a new line called Zoan Ash in 2015, which focuses on made to measure clothing, with couture-inspired outfits.

Sultana was invited to the 2016 Primetime Emmy Awards in Los Angeles, California, where she showed her brand at the Pre Emmys Gifting Suite.

In February 2017, Sultana's label Zoan Ash premiered at New York Fashion Week in Madison Square Garden.

On September 4, 2018, Sultana participated with her designs at the 7th anniversary of Jessica Minh Anh's “Catwalk on water” series in Paris.

2021 Cannes Film Festival nominated Bangladeshi actress Azmeri Haque Badhon wearing ZoanAsh designed by Asma Sultana

== Fashion shows ==
- 2017 : New York Fashion Week
- 2018 : 7th anniversary of Jessica Minh Anh's "Catwalk on water"
- 2019 : World Vision Fashion Show's GUINNESS WORLD RECORDS ATTEMPTS, Madrid Spain 2019
