= SBST =

SBST may refer to:

- SBS Transit, a public transport operator in Singapore
- Stage Bus Service Transformation (SBST), a federal government programme in Malaysia
- SBST, the ICAO airport code for Santos Air Base in Santos, São Paulo, Brazil
