= Meru Raya Terminal =

Terminal Meru Raya

General information
- Location: Persiaran Meru Raya 5, Meru Raya, 30020 Ipoh, Perak
- Coordinates: 4°40′13″N 101°4′19″E
- Owner: Perak Transit Berhad
- Operator: Perak Transit (local bus shuttles); Konsortium Ekspres (KBES); Kesatuan Ekspres; Maraliner; Sri Raya; Many others

Other information
- Website: www.terminalmeruraya.my

History
- Opened: September 25, 2012
Location

Terminal Meru Raya (formerly known as Terminal Amanjaya) is a major express bus terminal in Ipoh, state capital of Perak, Malaysia.

== History ==
Originally, the major terminal in Ipoh was located in Medan Gopeng. However, to modernize the transportation system of the city, the state government decided to build a new terminal in Meru Raya near Jelapang. The terminal was built with the cost of RM140 million.

While it has started initial operation in 2012, bus operators were reluctant to move to the new terminal. After talks with the state government, all remaining operators in Medan Gopeng moved to the new terminal from April 9, 2013.

In 2019, the terminal was renamed Terminal Meru Raya under the suggestion of the then-Menteri Besar of Perak, Ahmad Faizal Azumu, citing that the old name was inaccurate to the place it belongs to.

== Facilities ==
The terminal provides modern facilities such as air-conditioned waiting area, commercial outlets (restaurants and convenience store) and other facilities such as ATMs. They also has a separate bays for departures and arrivals, with departures on ground level and arrivals at Level 1. The local bus boarding area is also situated at level 1.

In 2019, the ticketing system was also switched to Centralized Ticketing System to avoid touting and to standardize bus tickets used to board the bus.

== Connection ==
The terminal has local bus connections with Perak Transit buses under the BAS.MY brand:

- A30A to Medan Kidd Bus Terminal
- A30B from Medan Kidd Bus Terminal to Chemor

These buses can be boarded from the local bus boarding bay at Level 1, and accepts VISA/Mastercard, Duitnow QR as well as cash as fare payments.
