= 578 Magnum =

- Film poster
- Vietnamese: 578: Phát đạn của kẻ điên
- Directed by: Lương Đình Dũng
- Written by: Lương Đình Dũng
- Produced by: Vũ Thị Ngọc Diệp; Lê Tôn Hà Phương; Ngô Thị Phương Thanh; Lương Đình Dũng
- Starring: Alexandre Nguyễn; H'Hen Niê; Hoàng Phúc; Ngọc Tình; Tuấn Hạc; Jessica Minh Anh; Nguyễn Lâm Thảo Tâm
- Cinematography: Morgan Schmidt
- Edited by: Steve M. Choe
- Music by: Lee Dong-june
- Production company: Tuvan Pictures
- Release date: 20 May 2022
- Running time: 106 minutes
- Country: Vietnam
- Language: Vietnamese

578 Magnum (Vietnamese: 578: Phát đạn của kẻ điên) is a 2022 Vietnamese action drama film written and directed by Lương Đình Dũng. The film stars Alexandre Nguyen, Thanh Thao, H'Hen Niê, Hoang Phuc, Ngoc Tinh, Tuan Hac, Jessica Minh Anh, Thao Tam and Ha Van Hieu.

The film was officially released on May 20, 2022, after previous arrangement, but was postponed due to the COVID-19 pandemic.

== Synopsis ==
A container truck driver, Hùng, lives an idyllic life with his little daughter, An. The father and daughter become the closest companions on every trip with their orange container truck. Life goes on like this until An has to leave his father to go to school. One day, Hùng is informed that An is severely depressed. Relying on his old abilities in the past and discovering the truth, Hùng is furious and hurt to learn that his little girl was kidnapped by a stranger. Beginning his lonely and intense journey searching for and chasing the unknown abuser, Hùng realizes that in order to hunt down this psychopath he has to counter the massive underground forces behind him.

== Release ==
578 Magnum premiered in Vietnam on May 20, 2022. The film was scheduled to be released on May 20, 2021, but was postponed due to the COVID-19 pandemic that broke out in Vietnam.

== See also ==
- List of submissions to the 95th Academy Awards for Best International Feature Film
- List of Vietnamese submissions for the Academy Award for Best International Feature Film
