= MyNews =

Malaysian retail convenience chain

Mynews Holding Berhad
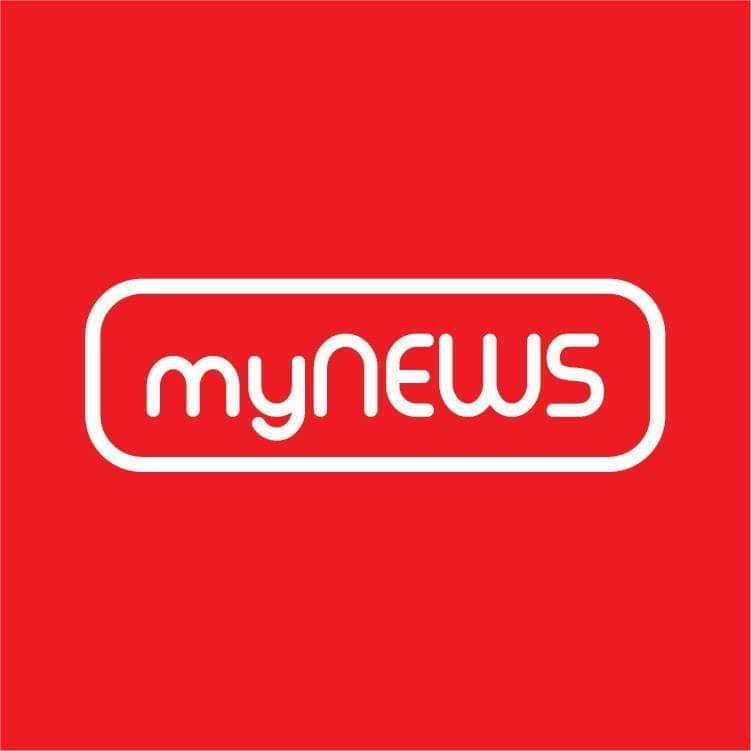

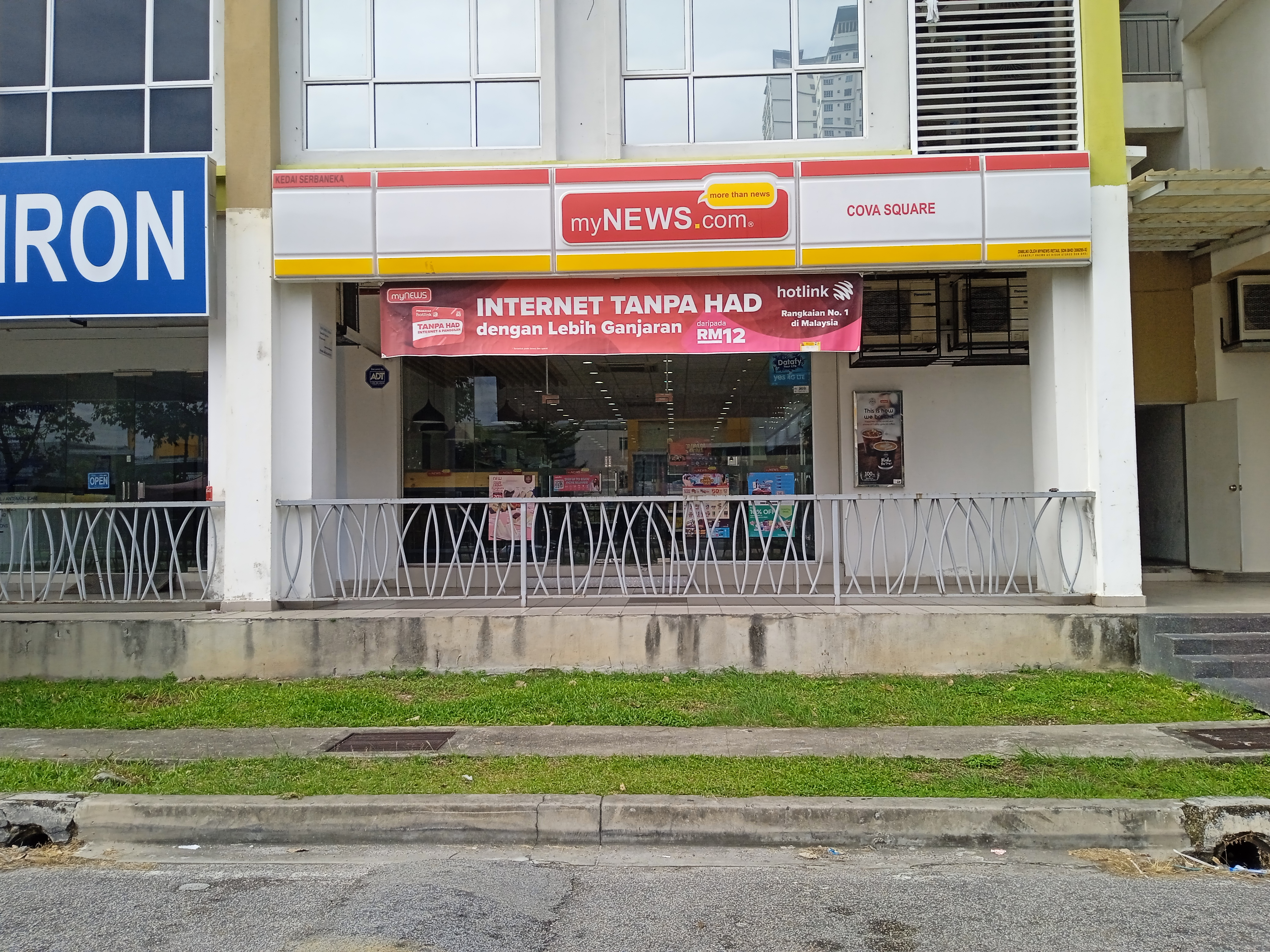
- Type: Private limited company
- Industry: Retailing
- Founded: 25 December 1996 – Damansara, Selangor, Malaysia
- Founder: Dang Tai Luk and the Dang family
- Headquarters: Level 20, First Ave, Malaysia
- Area served: Malaysia
- Products: Convenience products
- Brands: myNEWS.com
- Number of employees: Over 1600 (As of June 2018)
- Website: www.mynews.com.my

MyNews (stylized as myNEWS) is a retail convenience chain founded in 1996 by the Dang family. Originally established as a single newsstand, it has grown into one of the largest homegrown convenience store operators in Malaysia. As of 2026, myNEWS.com has more than 550 outlets, the majority of them located in the urban areas of Peninsular Malaysia. myNEWS outlets can be commonly found in shopping complexes, business hubs, transportation hubs and rail transport hubs, such as LRT and MRT stations. It currently serves over 3 million customers monthly and has more than 2800 employees.

== History ==
The business began on December 25, 1996, with the opening of a small newsstand called 'MagBit' in 1 Utama Shopping Centre by Dang Tai Luk. The company was developed as a family-run enterprise, with his brothers Dang Tai Wen and Dang Tai Hock playing key roles in the brand's expansion and the eventual transition to the myNEWS.com identity in 1997 with the opening of the first myNEWS.com outlet in Mid Valley Megamall. Subsequently, a company called Bison Stores Sdn Bhd was formed with plans to manage and expand myNEWS.com outlets across Malaysia. Bison started predominantly as a print media retailer and evolved to become a press and retail convenience outlet chain. Gradually progressing in the early stages, Bison Stores Sdn Bhd managed to open 10 outlets after three years in operation, and achieved its 100th outlet opening in 2007, its 200th outlet in 2014, and its 300th outlet in 2016.

In May 2016, the myNEWS.com brand name was licensed to two outlets at the Yangon International Airport in Myanmar.

On 2 October 2017, Bison Stores Sdn Bhd changed its company's name to Mynews Retail Sdn Bhd.

== Products and services ==
myNEWS sells magazines to convenience products such as household items, food and beverage, tobacco, personal hygiene and pharmaceutical products, snacks and drinks. Some selected outlets also offer other services, including prepaid top-up for mobile service providers, Touch ‘n Go reloads, bill payments, money remittance services and automated teller machines, photocopying, money changing, as well as courier services.

== Leadership ==
Since its founding as a family-run enterprise, the company has maintained a leadership structure centered around the Dang family. The management team is led by the company's founder, who transitioned to a supervisory executive role in 2023.

- Dang Tai Luk – Executive Chairman. A co-founder of the group, Dang established the first newsstand, MagBit, in 1996. He served as the Group CEO for over two decades before being appointed Executive Chairman on September 30, 2023.
- Dang Tai Wen – Group Chief Executive Officer. He joined the business in its early stages, utilizing his background in design to assist in the brand's contemporary redesign. He has held various senior management roles, including Deputy Group CEO, before assuming the role of Group CEO in September 2023.
- Dang Tai Hock – Chief Executive Officer (Food). He serves as an Executive Director and oversees the group's food processing and ready-to-eat segments, including the Japanese Food Hub partnership.

The founding family's involvement extends to the second generation, with Blake Dang Kuok Siang and Keith Dang Kuok acting as alternate directors.

== Sustainability ==
myNEWS has implemented several sustainability policies to address its environmental impact. The company has conducted a comprehensive carbon footprint assessment at its headquarters, identifying Scope 1 emissions at 1,053,147 kg, Scope 2 emissions at 2,155,937 kg, and Scope 3 emissions at 2,188,466 kg. To further reduce its environmental footprint, myNEWS has installed solar panels at its headquarters and food processing center (FPC), generating 1,325,602 kWh of clean energy in fiscal year 2023, a 69% increase from the previous year, and resulting in a 10% reduction in energy costs. Additionally, the company has launched various recycling initiatives, including the reuse of wooden pallets and increased recycling rates for carton boxes, which have saved over 6,000 Malaysian ringgit. myNEWS has also made significant strides in reducing traditional plastic usage, opting for biodegradable alternatives, and has recycled 58,029 kg of used cooking oil into biofuels and biodiesel.
