= Ecstasy (clothing) =

Bangladeshi fashion brand

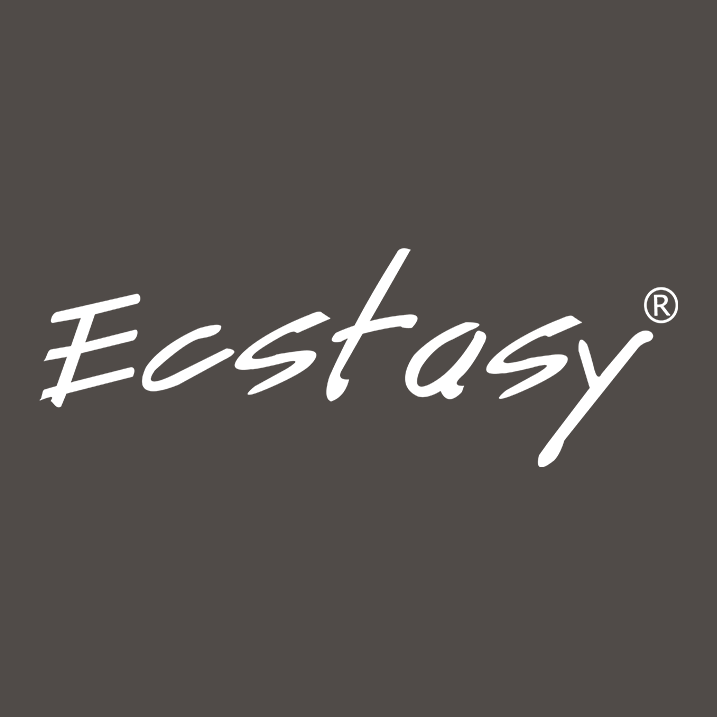
- Type: Limited
- Industry: Apparel/Clothing/Fashion Accessories
- Founded: 1997; 29 years ago
- Founder: Tanjim Haque
- Headquarters: Banani Dhaka 1212, Bangladesh.
- Key people: Tanjim Haque, Asma Sultana
- Products: Men's, Women's Apparel & Accessories
- Website: ecstasybd.com

Ecstasy is a clothing, fashion, and lifestyle brand based in Bangladesh. The flagship store is located in Banani, Dhaka. The company was founded by Tanjim Haque who is also the CEO.

== History ==
Ecstasy was established in 1997. It is a multi-store franchise and is one of the largest clothing brands in Bangladesh. The store describes its items as contemporary global fashion inspired.

== Retail Expansion ==
Ecstasy opened its first lifestyle store at Bashundhara City in 2009, spanning over 12,000 square feet. The brand later expanded with flagship outlets in Banani (2015) and Dhanmondi (2016).

== Sustainability Initiatives ==
In 2024, Ecstasy introduced sustainability measures including the use of organic cotton in selected collections and eco-friendly packaging materials.

The brand also launched a recycling program encouraging customers to return used clothing for upcycling, aiming to reduce textile waste and promote circular fashion.

== Brand Collaborations and Limited Editions ==
In late 2024, Ecstasy collaborated with Bangladeshi illustrator and graffiti artist Mehedi Karim for a limited edition graphic T-shirt line themed around Dhaka’s urban culture.

The limited drop was available both online and in flagship stores, and it received notable attention from younger fashion consumers and local fashion bloggers.

The brand has previously released special Eid and Pohela Boishakh collections in limited quantities featuring seasonal prints and fabric combinations exclusive to short-term campaigns.
