= Mid Valley Megamall =

Shopping mall in Kuala Lumpur, Malaysia

- Mall interior
- Location: Mid Valley City, Kuala Lumpur, Malaysia
- Coordinates: 3°7′5″N 101°40′36″E
- Opened: 20 November 1999; 26 years ago as Mid Valley Megamall; 26 September 2007; 19 years ago, Phase 2 of Mid Valley Megamall & The Gardens Mall
- Developer: IGB Berhad
- Manager: IGB REIT Management Sdn. Bhd.
- Owner: IGB Berhad
- Num. of stores: 430
- Floor area: 1,700,000 sq ft (160,000 m^{2})
- Floors: 5 (excluding car park) at Mid Valley Megamall Zone A, C, G, H & The Gardens Zone B, U & Premier
- Public transit: KB01 Mid Valley Station; KD01 KJ17 Abdullah Hukum station
- Website: www.midvalley.com.my

Mid Valley Megamall is a shopping mall in Mid Valley City, Kuala Lumpur, Malaysia. It sits at the entrance of Petaling Jaya and Kuala Lumpur. Developed by IGB Berhad, the complex was opened in 1999. The mall has garnered media attention with events like the IT Fair, Home and Decoration Fair, and The MATTA Fair being held in the Mid Valley Exhibition Centre (MVEC). It was awarded Best Shopping Complex Award 2000 by Tourism Malaysia and Best Retail Development 2001 by FIABCI Malaysia.

It was announced that a second mall, Mid Valley Southkey, had been slated for 2019 in the Iskandar region of Johor Bahru.

== Incidents ==
On 30 May 2017, a fire broke out on Megamall's lower ground floor at 8:20 pm local time. The Malaysian Fire and Rescue Department managed to put it out by 8:52 pm. A subsequent investigation traced the cause of the fire to a faulty facsimile machine located inside a mynews.com convenience store.

On 17 May 2023, an isolated fire broke out at the mall. The fire started from the TNB substation plant but was contained by the firefighters in less than an hour. The incident was believed to be caused by an overheating cooling oil within the TNB substation.

== Building ==
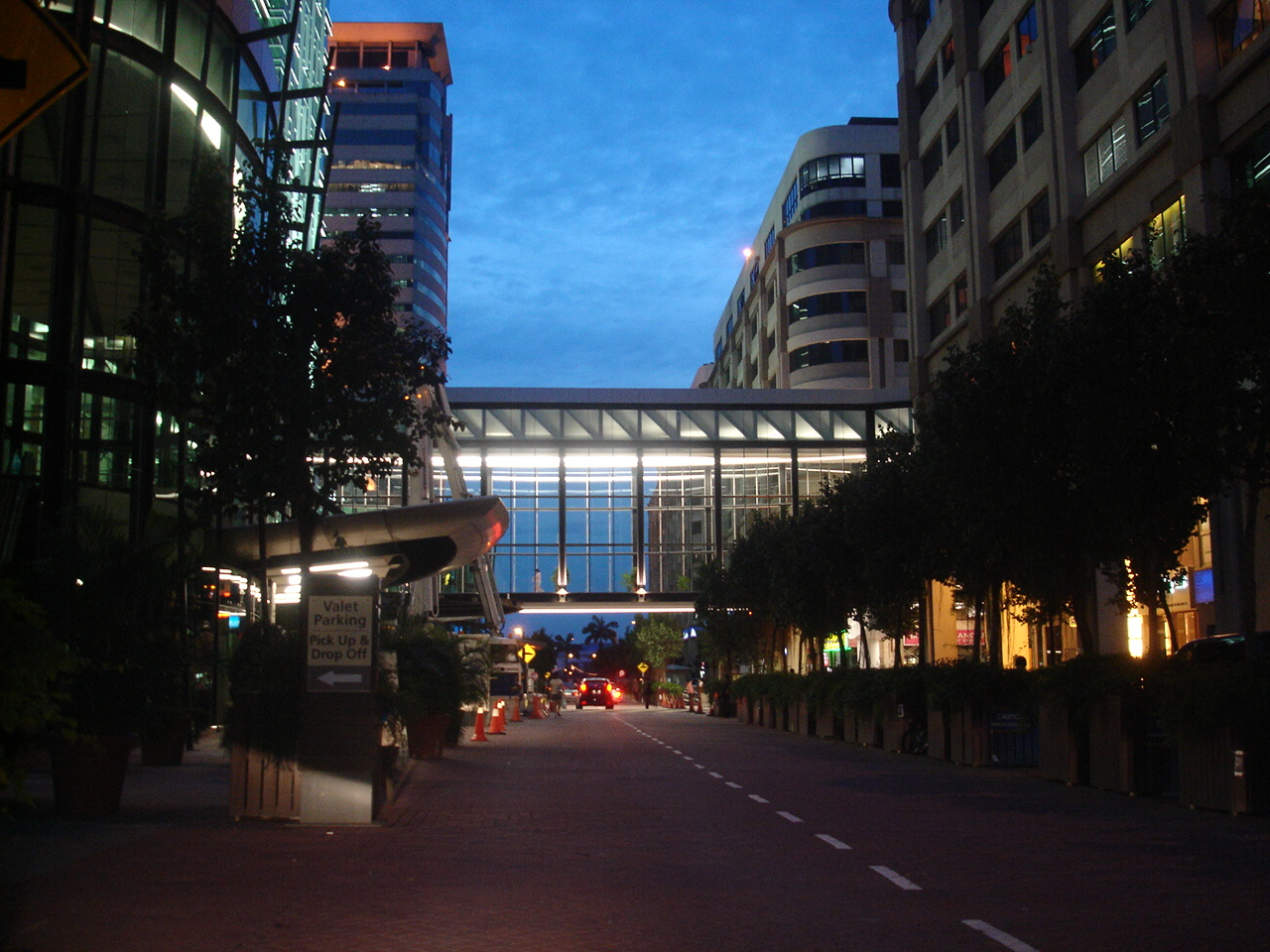
The connecting bridge between Mid Valley Megamall

It comprises a shopping mall, an office tower block, 30 offices, and three hotels. Within the main mall, anchor tenants include Mid Valley Exhibition Centre, AEON, GSC Cinemas, Celebrity Fitness, MUJI, Metrojaya, Uniqlo and Harvey Norman.

A second mall, The Gardens Mall, is adjacent and connected to the Megamall. The mall has 4,500,000 sq ft (420,000 m^{2}) of total floor area, out of which 1,700,000 sq ft (160,000 m^{2}) is leasable space. This whole area is sometimes referred to as Mid Valley City.

It houses a 48,300 sq ft (4,490 m^{2}) convention centre and it is adjacent to a 646-room business hotel named Cititel Midvalley. A further two hotels are in the same area: The Boulevard Hotel, The Gardens Hotel and Residences. There has been a proposal to link Mid Valley Megamall and Masjid Jamek via a 5.5 km (3.4 mi) bicycle lane.

== Sister mall ==
=== Mid Valley Southkey ===
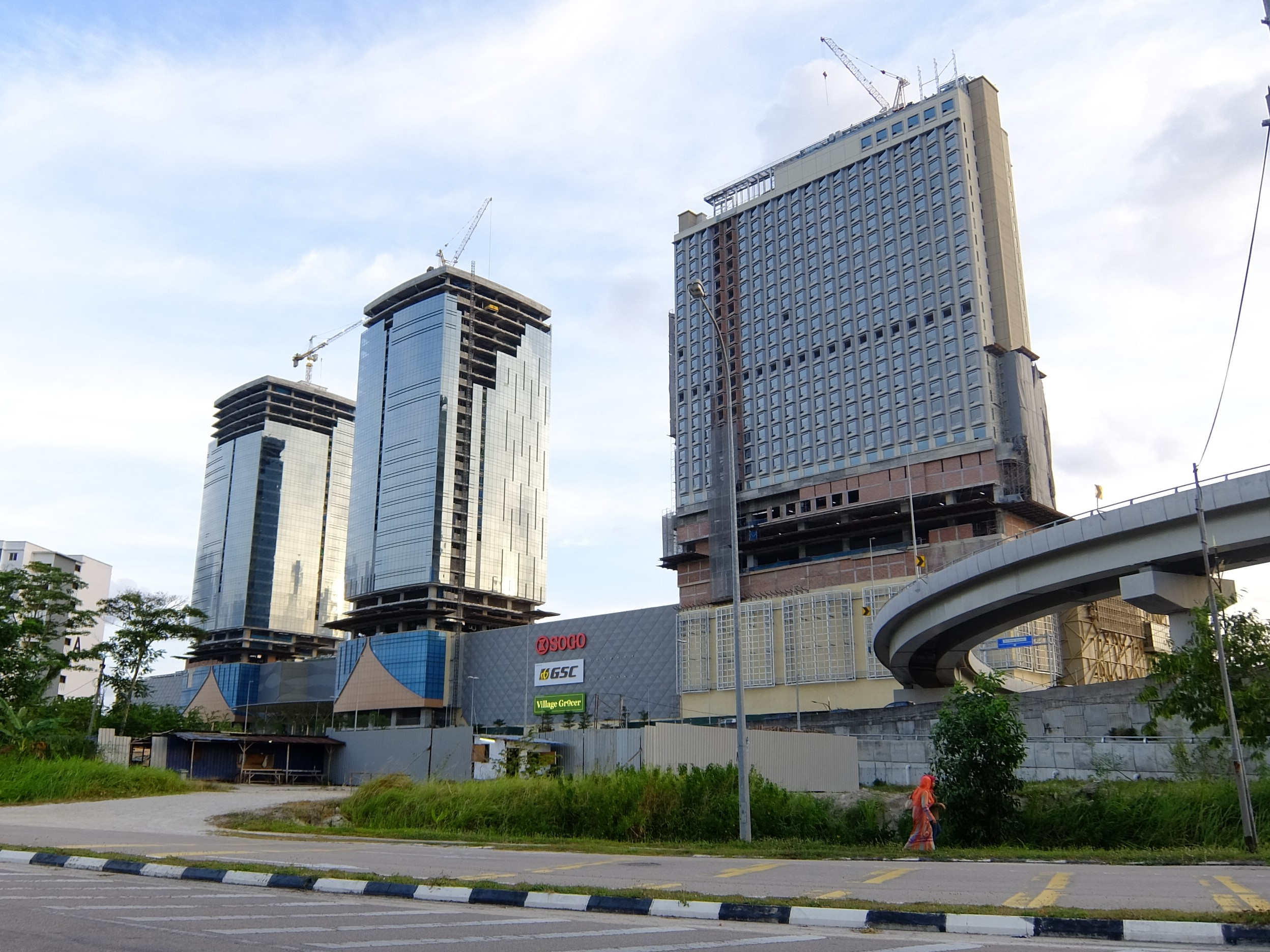
Mid Valley Southkey in Johor Bahru, Johor.

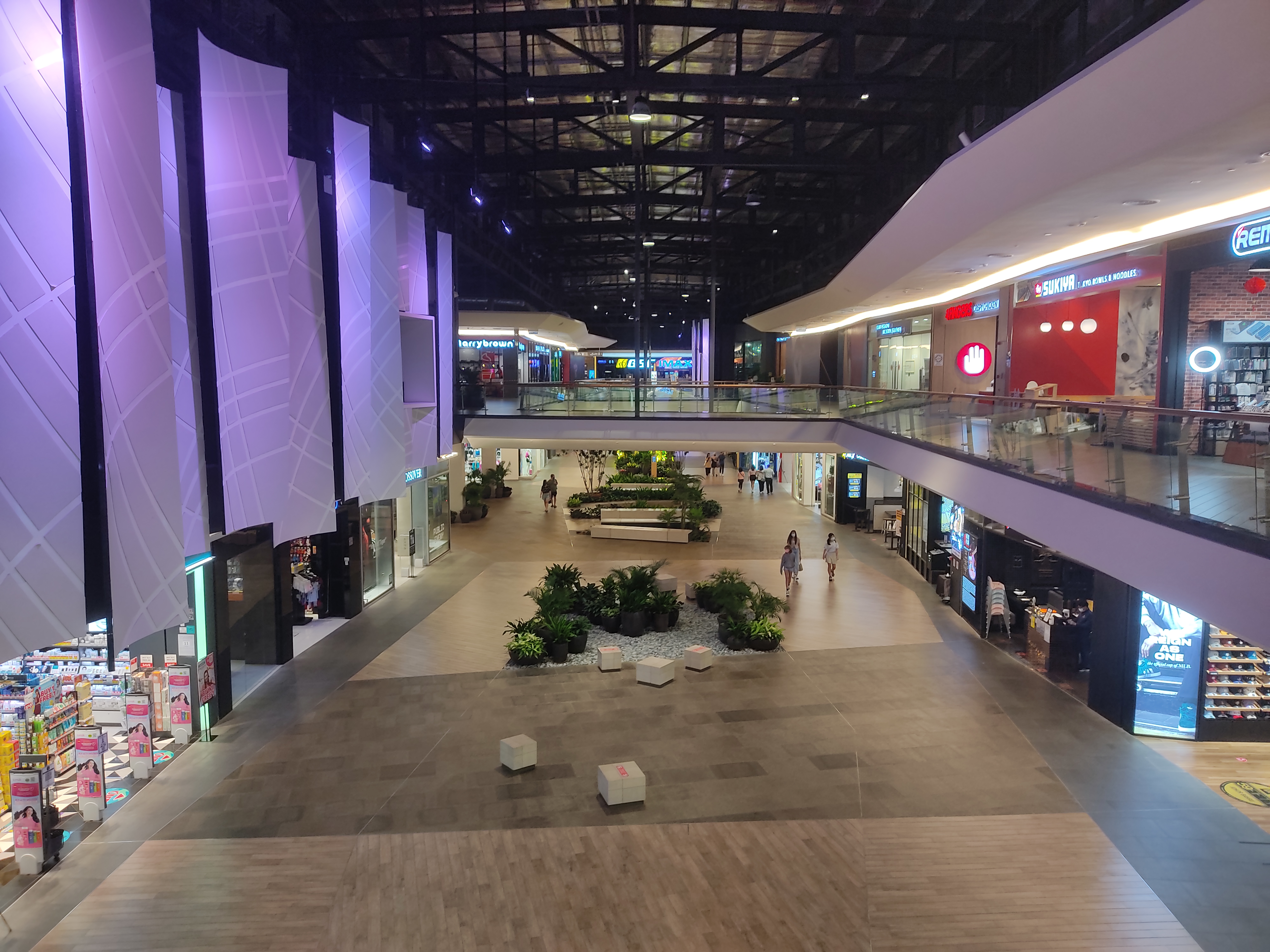
Interior of Mid Valley Southkey

The Mall, Mid Valley Southkey, located in Johor Bahru, Johor, is the second Mid Valley branded shopping centre and opened on 23 April 2019. The mall is anchored by GSC Cinemas, SOGO, Swiss Watch Gallery, Nitori, Harvey Norman and Village Grocer.

== Transportation ==
=== Train ===
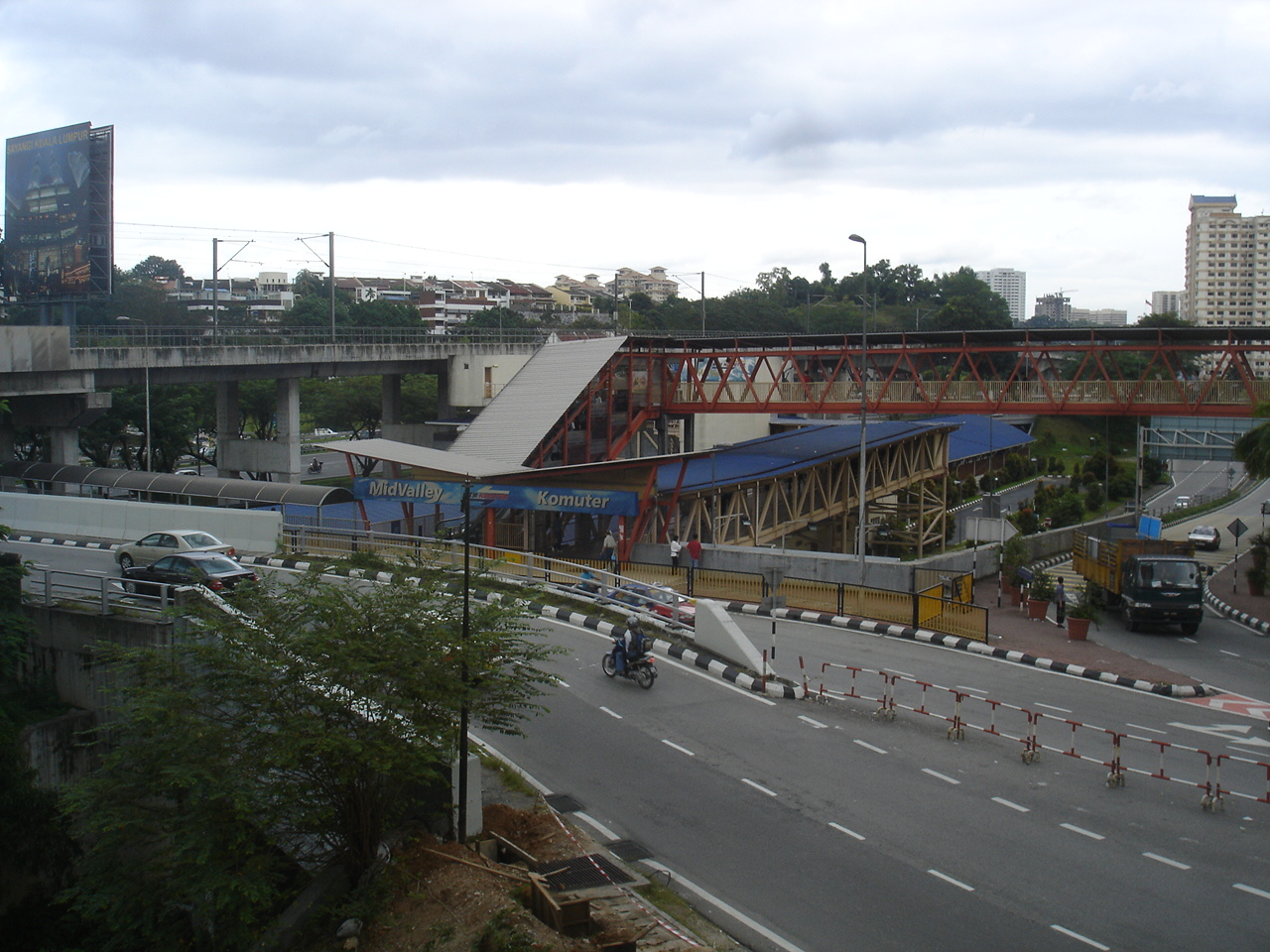
Mid Valley Megamall KTM Komuter station

The mall is connected via link bridge to the Mid Valley Station of KTM Komuter.

The mall is also located within walking distance from the Abdullah Hukum station. However, for many years, there was no proper connection between the station and the mall. With the completion of the Abdullah Hukum KTM Komuter station, a dedicated pedestrian bridge has been constructed to link The Gardens Mall and the station through KL Eco City.

=== Bus ===
Free shuttle bus service provided by the mall is available to and from Bank Rakyat-Bangsar LRT station, as well as Rapid KL Bus T788 which travels to and from the KL Gateway–Universiti station and MRT feeder bus T818 which travels to and from the Pavilion Damansara Heights–Pusat Bandar Damansara station.

== See also ==
- List of shopping malls in Malaysia
- List of convention and exhibition centers
