= Jessica Minh Anh =

Vietnamese supermodel

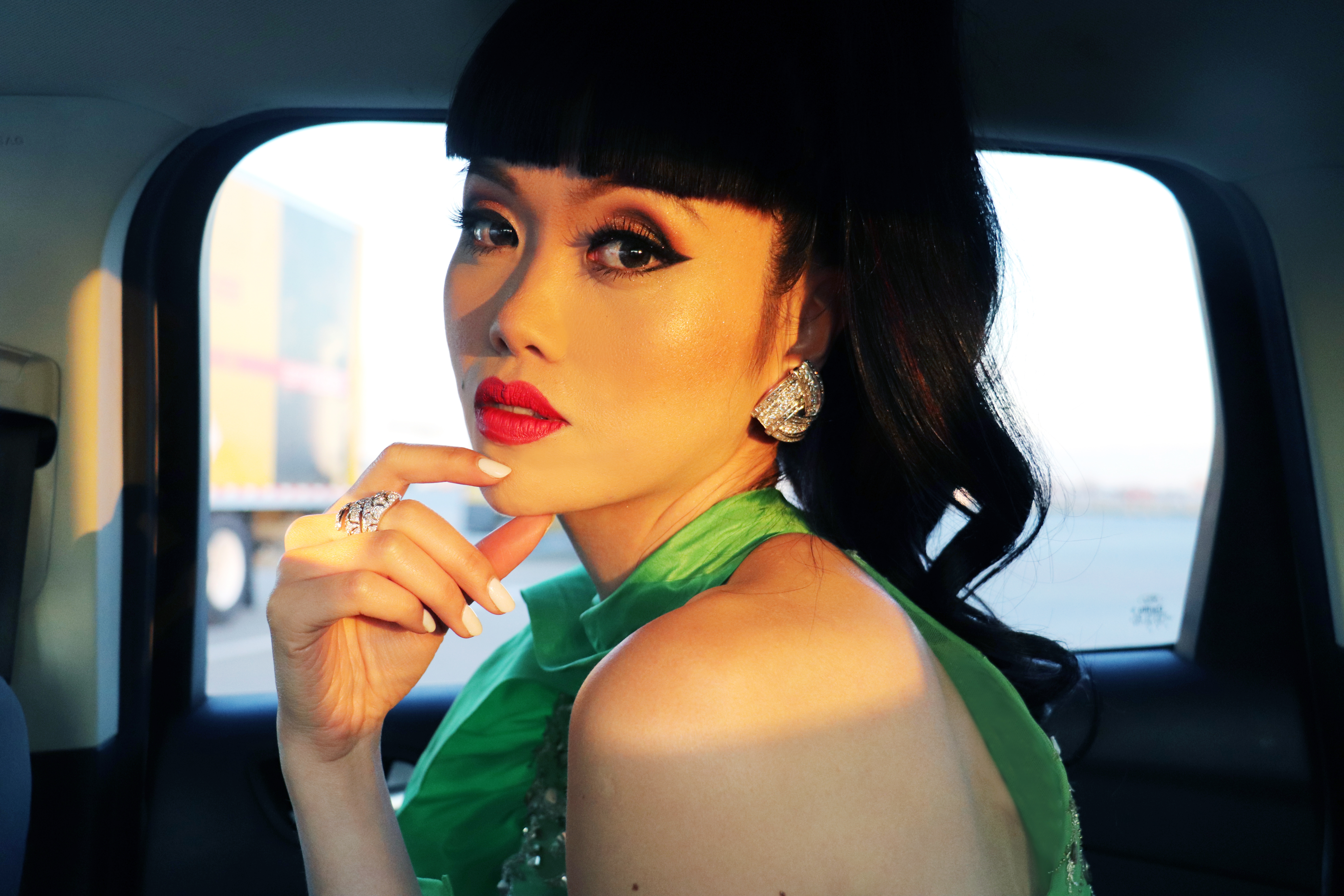
- Born: 19 June 1988 (age 38); Hanoi, Vietnam
- Education: master's degree
- Alma mater: Universiti Teknologi Petronas; University of Birmingham
- Occupations: supermodel; show producer; actress
- Height: 175 cm (5 ft 9 in)
- Website: Official website

Jessica Minh Anh (born 19 June 1988) is a Vietnamese supermodel, show producer and actress based in Paris, France.

== Early life ==
Anh was born in Hanoi, Vietnam and grew up in Moscow, Russia. She originally studied at Hanoi University of Science and Technology in Vietnam before moving to Malaysia to obtained her bachelor's degree in information technology from Universiti Teknologi Petronas. Anh then obtained her master's degree in marketing communications from University of Birmingham in the United Kingdom.

== Personal life ==
Anh is fluent in Vietnamese and Russian.

== Filmography ==
Year	Title	Role
2022	578 Magnum	
