= Mid Valley Southkey =

Shopping mall in Johor Bahru, Johor, Malaysia

The Mall, Mid Valley Southkey
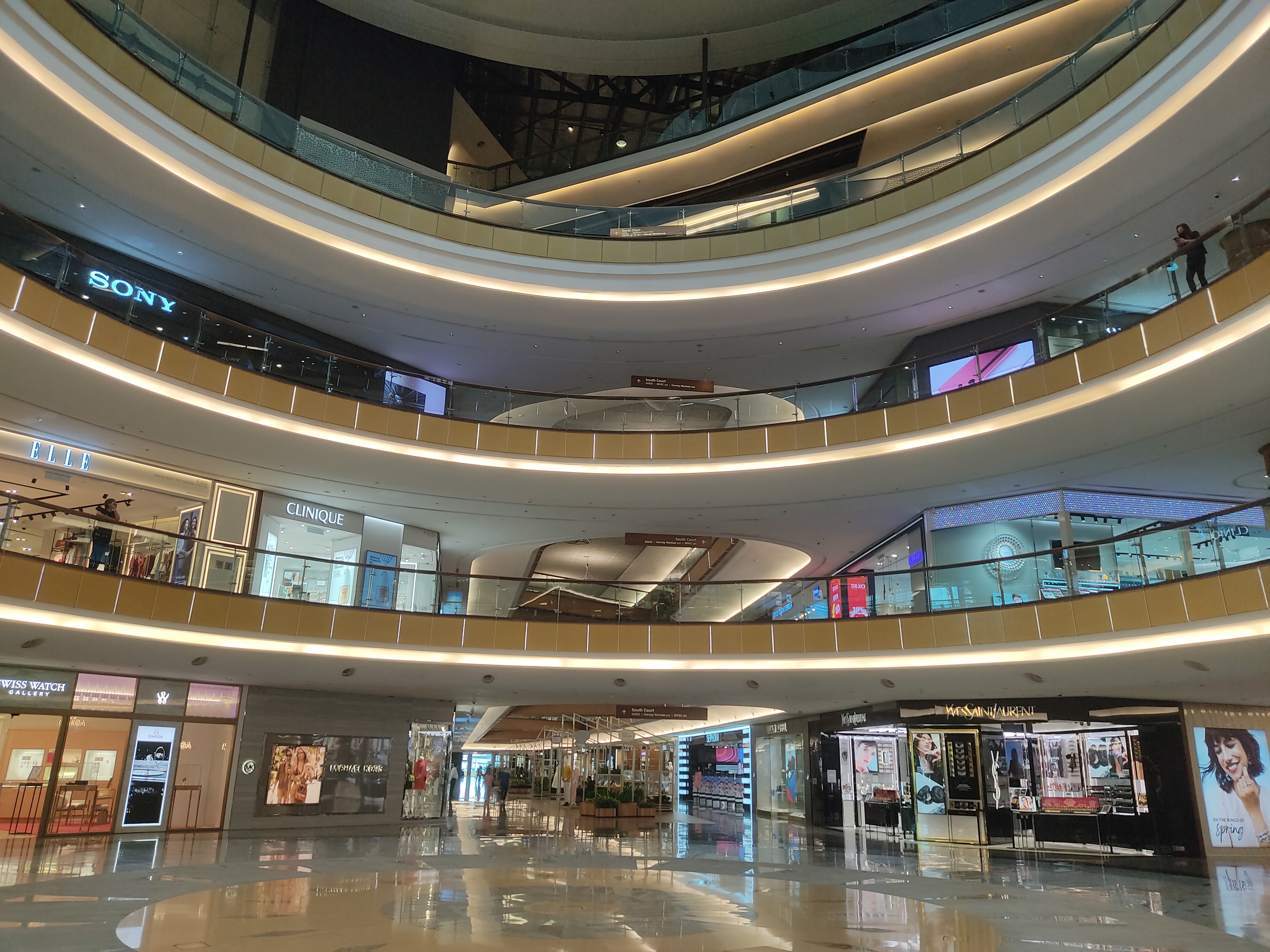
- Mall interior
- Location: Johor Bahru, Johor, Malaysia
- Coordinates: 01°30′04.5″N 103°46′38.5″E
- Address: LG-046, The Mall, Mid Valley Southkey, Persiaran Southkey 1, Southkey, 80150 Johor Bahru, Johor
- Opened: April 23, 2019
- Developer: SouthKey City Sdn Bhd
- Manager: Southkey Megamall Sdn Bhd
- Owner: IGB Berhad
- Num. of stores: 300
- Num. of anchor tenants: 6
- Floor area: 5.3 Million square feet
- Floors: 6 (mall area excluded 2 basement parking)
- Parking: 6,500 Parking Bays
- Website: www.midvalleysouthkey.com

Mid Valley Southkey is a shopping mall in Johor Bahru, Johor, Malaysia. Opened on 23 April 2019, it is Malaysia's largest shopping mall outside Greater Kuala Lumpur, as well as the largest in Johor.

Closely modelled after Mid Valley Megamall, Mid Valley Southkey also includes Mid Valley Exhibition Centre Johor Bahru (MVEC JB), two office towers and a hotel tower managed by St. Giles Hotels.

== History ==
The mall is managed by IGB Berhad, same as Mid Valley Megamall and The Gardens Mall located in Kuala Lumpur.

It is located within the Southkey development, which is developed by Southkey City Sdn Bhd.

In 2025, IGB Berhad and Southkey City announced a new mixed-development directly beside Mid Valley Southkey. Comprising new retail mall, commercial and hospitality components, together with Mid Valley Southkey, it is set to rival the scale of the Mid Valley City in Kuala Lumpur. Construction began on 1 March 2026, and is scheduled to be completed on 30 June 2028.

== Retail outlets ==
There are more than 300 tenants in Mid Valley Southkey, with the anchor tenants being SOGO, AURUM Theatre, Swiss Watch Gallery, GSC Cinemas, Harvey Norman, Nitori, MANGO, Village Grocer and LEGO. The mall is home to the biggest Tesla experience centre in Malaysia, spanning 3,300 ft.

It also houses many luxury brands, including Coach, Armani, Michael Kors, Dior, Chanel, Rolex, Guerlain, Tudor, Yves Saint Laurent, Jo Malone London, Aesop, among others.

== Transportation ==
The mall is directly accessible via the Johor Bahru Eastern Dispersal Link Expressway, which connects to the North–South Expressway, Johor Bahru East Coast Parkway and Johor–Singapore Causeway via the Sultan Iskandar CIQ. The mall is also reachable via Jalan Bakar Batu, which connects to Tebrau Expressway and the rest of Johor Bahru.

Currently, 3 public bus routes operate from JB Sentral, Larkin Sentral and PPR Sri Stulang to Mid Valley Southkey, routes J15, P102 and P103.
