= Stage Bus Service Transformation =

Public bus networks in Malaysia

Stage Bus Service Transformation (SBST)
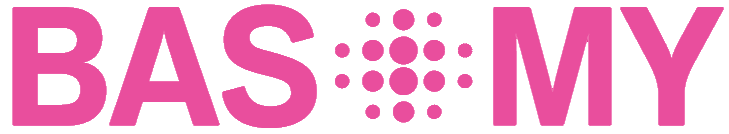

Overview
- Owner: Ministry of Transport
- Locale: Malaysia
- Transit type: Stage bus

A T57 (now N57) route bus featuring the original blue and white myBAS livery, used during the initial phase of the SBST programme (2015–2024).

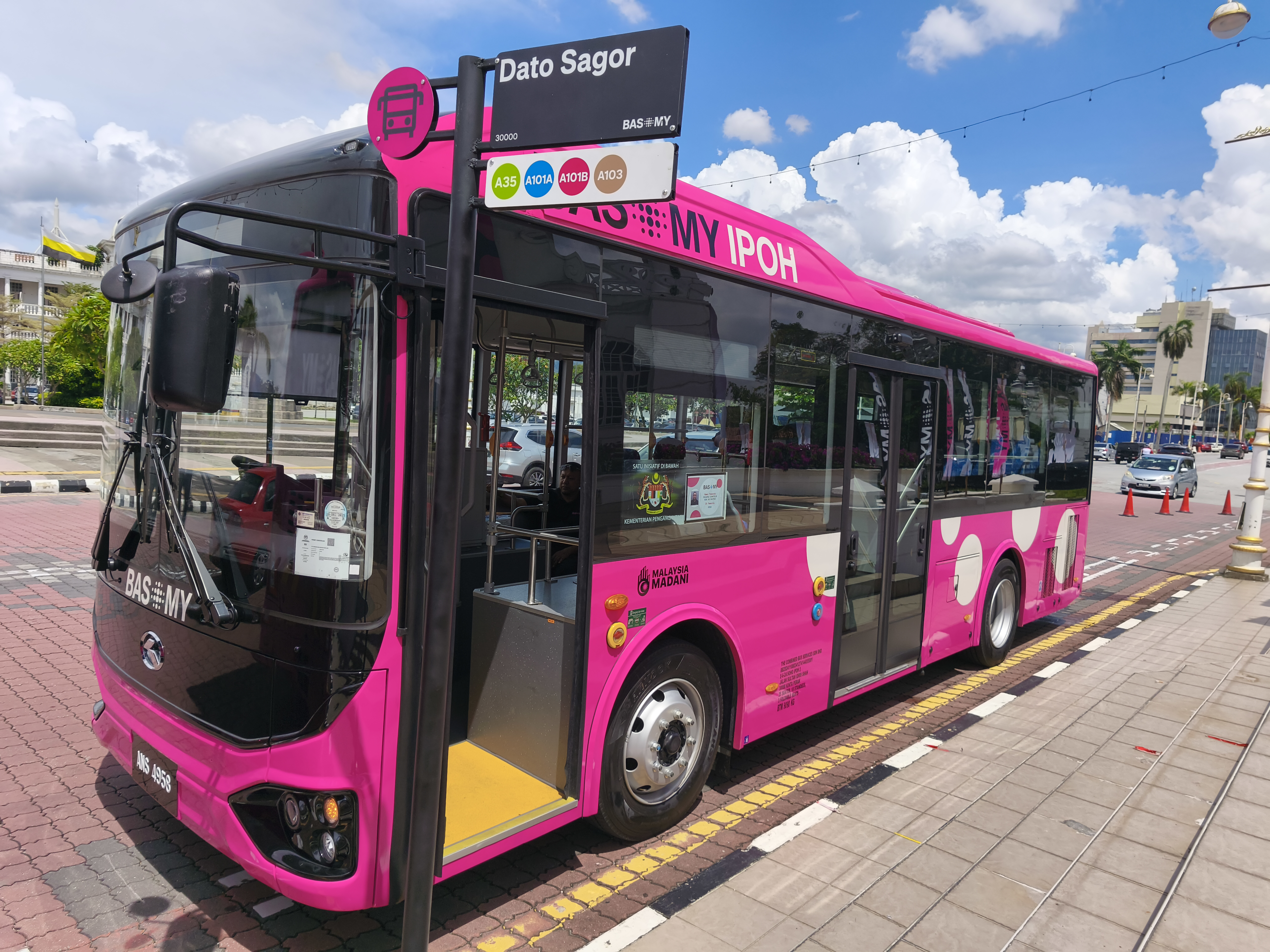
The revamped BAS.MY buses introduced in 2025 in Ipoh, painted in a distinctive pink livery. These newer units are equipped with disability-friendly facilities (OKU access) and real-time GPS tracking.

The Stage Bus Service Transformation (SBST) programme (Malay: Program Transformasi Bas Berhenti-Henti), commonly branded as BAS.MY (formerly known as myBAS, an abbreviation for Malaysia Bas Awam Sepadu), is a government initiative launched by the Ministry of Transport of Malaysia to enhance public bus networks in key state capitals and urban areas outside the Klang Valley. The programme is regulated by the Land Public Transport Agency (APAD) in Peninsular Malaysia, and the Commercial Vehicle Licensing Board (LPKP) in Sabah and Sarawak.

== Business model and features ==
According to the SPAD 2017 Annual Report, the SBST programme implements a gross-cost contracting model designed to improve the reliability of stage bus services. The initiative is built upon four main concepts: network planning, gross-cost contracts, cashless payments, and performance monitoring. Under this framework, routes are strategically designed based on established network planning principles rather than individual operator preferences.

Bus operators are paid based on vehicle kilometers traveled under an eight-year contract, while the government, through the regulating agency, absorbs the operational risk, covers operating costs, and collects all farebox revenue. To enhance passenger convenience, the programme implements an electronic ticket payment system. Furthermore, strict performance monitoring is enforced; buses are equipped with real-time GPS tracking that feeds data directly into a central Command and Control Centre, and operators face financial penalties if they fail to meet stringent service Key Performance Indicators (KPIs).

== History ==
The Stage Bus Service Transformation programme was first announced during the tabling of the 2015 Budget in October 2014. The initiative aimed for gradual implementation in Kangar (Perlis), Seremban (Negeri Sembilan), Ipoh (Perak), and Kuala Terengganu (Terengganu).

The myBAS service commenced operations in Kangar on 1 August 2015, initially covering 337 km across six trunk and four feeder routes. This was followed by Seremban on 15 November 2015, which was expanded in January 2016 to cover 656 km with a fleet of 110 buses operating 22 routes. Ipoh saw its first phase launched on 1 June 2016, followed by a second phase in September 2016. The Ipoh network was subsequently revamped on 15 March 2018 to cover 367 km with 16 routes integrated at Medan Kidd and Terminal Amanjaya. Operations in Kuala Terengganu began on 1 March 2018. Notably, Kuala Terengganu and Johor Bahru were designated as the first cities under the scheme to introduce electric buses into their fleets.

The scheme was later expanded to other major cities. Johor Bahru launched its myBAS service on 31 March 2022. Subsequently, Melaka introduced its SBST service on 1 May 2024. These were the first services to implement contactless card payments via Visa and Mastercard, as well as the My50 unlimited bus pass for Malaysian citizens.

=== Rebranding to BAS.MY ===
In 2024, Transport Minister Anthony Loke announced a comprehensive revamp of the SBST programme, rebranding it as BAS.MY. This rebranding involved a transition from the original blue-and-white livery (or yellow-green-white in Johor Bahru) to a standardized pink livery. The revamp also introduced digital fare payment methods via QR codes, alongside the implementation of the My50 unlimited pass and free travel passes for students, the elderly, and persons with disabilities (OKU).

Following the rebranding, the scheme was expanded to further cities in 2025:

- Kuching, Sarawak: Launched on 5 March 2025, marking the first expansion of the SBST scheme to East Malaysia.
- Kedah: Alor Setar received dedicated BAS.MY services on 1 June 2025, alongside Sungai Petani, which became the first non-capital town to be included in the scheme.
- Kota Bharu, Kelantan: Services began on 1 August 2025, with BAS.MY taking over existing routes previously operated by Konsortium E-Mutiara under the Mutiara Rentas Desa brand.
- Kota Kinabalu, Sabah: Trial runs commenced on 10 October 2025.
- Kuantan, Pahang: The scheme is scheduled to expand to Kuantan in December 2025, with selected routes extended into small part of Kemaman, replacing the Rapid Kuantan bus service.

== Operation ==
Public bus networks operating under the Stage Bus Service Transformation programme were established in the following cities:

List of Stage Bus Service Transformation (BAS.MY) public bus networks
Service Network	Service Area	Number of Routes	Year of Launch	Operator	Average Daily Ridership (2025)	Description
BAS.MY Kangar	Kangar, Perlis	9	2015	MARA Liner	439	Network includes connections to Alor Setar and northern Kedah.
BAS.MY Seremban	Seremban, Negeri Sembilan	22	2015	Gopi Travel Tours, KR Travel & Tours, Southern Omnibus, Unitedbas	3,709	Coverage extends to other towns including Nilai, Port Dickson, Kuala Pilah, Tampin, Jelebu, Bahau and Sepang. There is route between Nilai Sentral and KLIA.
BAS.MY Ipoh	Ipoh, Perak	17	2016	Perak Transit	3,508	Routes cover Kuala Kangsar and Seri Iskandar; expanded to Kampar following the BAS.MY rebranding.
BAS.MY Kuala Terengganu	Kuala Terengganu, Terengganu	9	2018	MARA Liner	754	Includes coverage for Marang and Kuala Berang.
BAS.MY Johor Bahru	Johor Bahru, Johor	21	2022	Handal Indah, Transit Link (Johor Bahru), Maju, S&S International	31,412	Took over original trunk routes from respective operators, extending to Kota Tinggi, Pontian, and Kulai. First city in the scheme to accept Visa/Mastercard payments and the My50 pass.
BAS.MY Melaka	Melaka	22	2024	Handal Indah, MARA Liner	2,411	Replaced statewide trunk routes formerly operated by Panorama Melaka. First city to officially launch with the BAS.MY branding.
BAS.MY Kuching	Kuching, Sarawak	15	2025	Biramas Express (BusAsia)	-	First East Malaysian city to implement the service. Routes extend to Serian, Bau, and Kota Samarahan.
BAS.MY Kota Setar	Alor Setar and Sungai Petani, Kedah	14	2025	Gopi Travel Tours	1,755	Dedicated services covering major urban areas in Kedah.
BAS.MY Kota Bharu	Kota Bharu, Kelantan	16	2025	Konsortium E-Mutiara	2,085	Replaced trunk routes previously operated under the Mutiara Rentas Desa brand.
BAS.MY Kota Kinabalu	Kota Kinabalu, Sabah	8	2025	Jaguh Bayu (Handal Indah)	-	
BAS.MY Kuantan	Kuantan, Pahang	16	2025	Sanwa Tours	1.520	Replaced routes previously operated by Rapid Bus under the Rapid Kuantan brand.

== See also ==
- Bus transport in Malaysia
- Prasarana Malaysia
- Land Public Transport Agency
