= Bandar Seri Bandi =

Town in Terengganu, Malaysia

Coordinates: 4°22′28.2″N 103°19′53.0″E

Bandar Seri Bandi (Jawi: بندر سري بند) is a town in Kemaman District, Terengganu, Malaysia.
