= KK Sentral =

Bus station in Malaysia

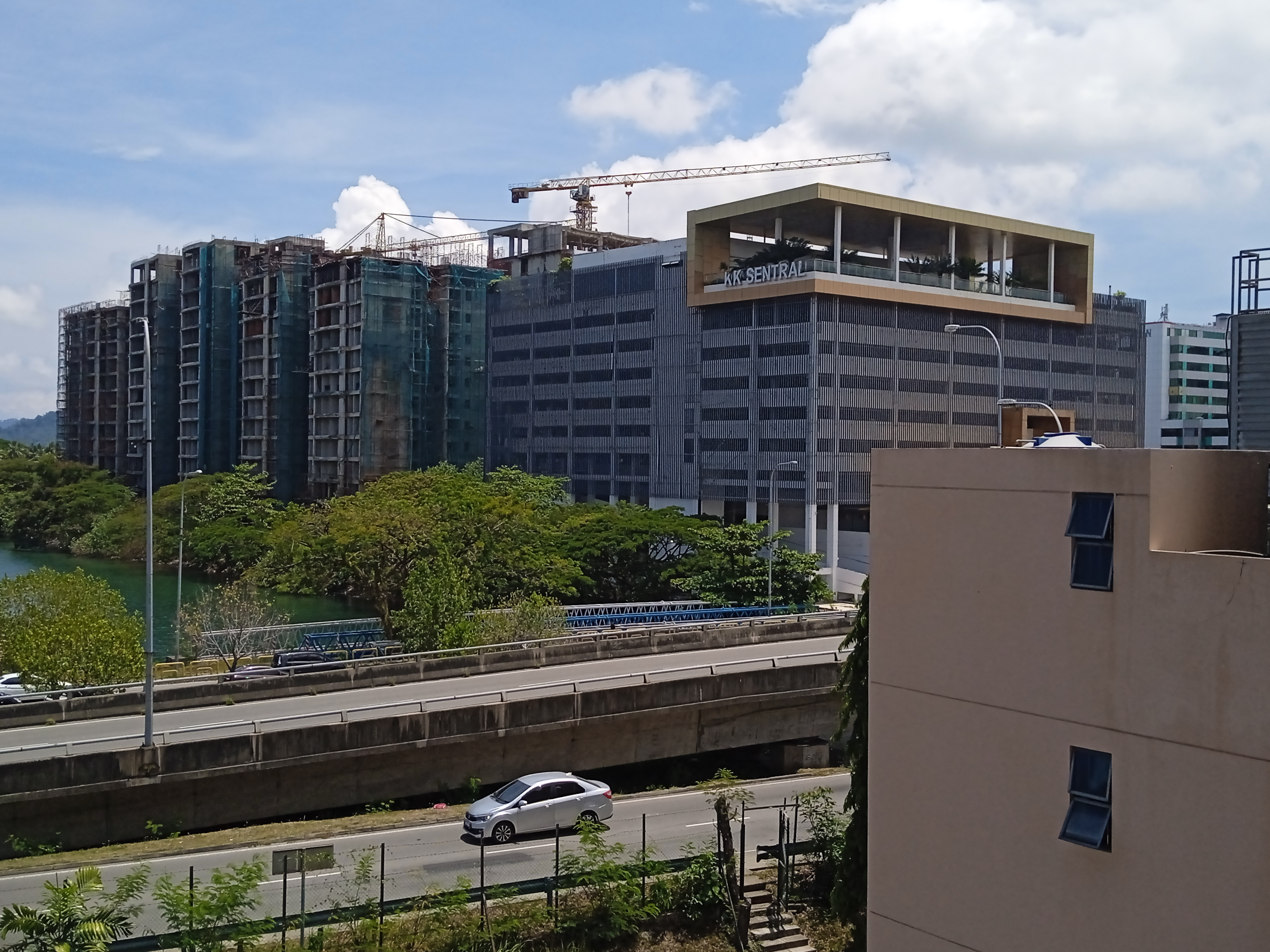
- KK Sentral from Hotel Ming Garden Kota Kinabalu

General information
- Location: Jalan Kemajuan, 88000 Kota Kinabalu, Sabah, Malaysia; Malaysia
- Coordinates: 5°58′20.9″N 116°04′06.0″E
- System: Commercial development hub and urban transportation hub
- Owner: DBKK
- Lines: West Coast Division; Interior Division
- Bus routes: West Coast Division (Kota Kinabalu) → Interior Division (Beaufort, Sipitang, Menumbok) → Limbang Division (Lawas) → Brunei

Construction
- Parking: Available with payments (free for the first 15 minutes)
- Accessible: Yes

History
- Opened: 28 July 2019
Location

KK Sentral or also called as KK Sentral Bus Terminal (Malay: Terminal Bas KK Sentral) is a bus station in the city of Kota Kinabalu, Sabah, Malaysia. The terminal sits on a three-hectare site of land and operating express bus services from the city to Beaufort, Sipitang, Menumbok, Lawas and Brunei.

Fully opened on 28 July 2019, KK Sentral replaced the old temporary bus station at Jalan Tugu. KK Sentral is the first smart and systematic bus station in the state of Sabah.

== History ==
The terminal building started to be constructed in 2011 before finally completed in 2017 as one of the four integrated bus terminals planned under the Kota Kinabalu City Public Transportation Master Plan. The Sentral's parking lots opened on 5 July 2017 while its bus service was opened on 28 July 2019 at a cost of around RM54 million.

== Features ==
The terminal is equipped with two main blocks; namely Blocks A and B which have various facilities including bus ticket and information counters, food courts, parking lots, prayer room (surau) for Muslims and facilities for disabled people.

== Services ==
KK Sentral provides express bus services to Beaufort, Sipitang, Menumbok, Lawas and Brunei. BAS.MY Kota Kinabalu, the newest city bus route will depart from KK Sentral.
