= Universiti Teknologi Petronas =

Private university in Perak, Malaysia

Coordinates: 4°23′11″N 100°58′47″E

Universiti Teknologi PETRONAS
- PETRONAS University of Technology (English)
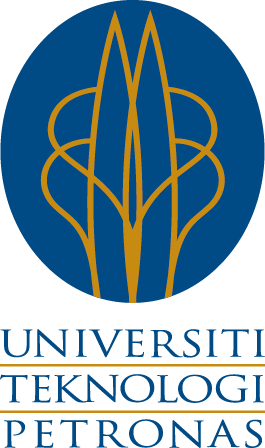
- Motto: Energising Futures
- Type: Private research university
- Established: 10 January 1997
- Affiliations: ASAIHL
- Chancellor: Tan Sri Dr. Hassan Marican
- President: Ir. Mohamed Firouz Asnan
- Provost: Professor Benjamin Colin Cosh
- Pro-Chancellors: Tan Sri Tengku Muhammad Taufik Tengku Kamadjaja Aziz; Tan Sri Zaharah Ibrahim
- Undergraduates: Over 6000
- Postgraduates: Over 1200
- Location: Seri Iskandar, Perak, Malaysia
- Campus: 1,000 acres (400 ha)
- Colours: Blue sapphire and gold
- Nickname: UTP
- Website: www.utp.edu.my
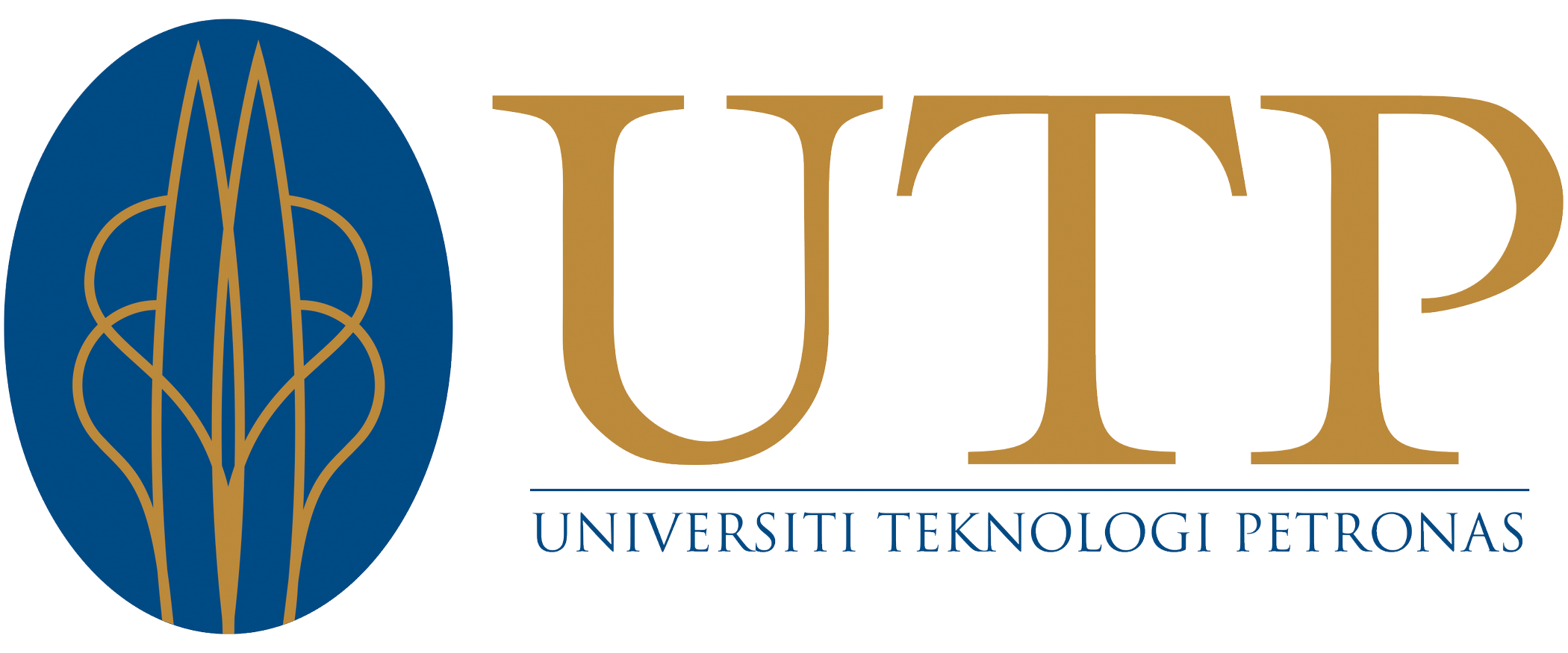

University rankings

Global – Overall
- QS World: =251 (2026)
- THE World: 201-250th

Regional – Overall
- THE Asia: 43rd

Universiti Teknologi PETRONAS (UTP) is a private Malaysian Research university established on 10 January 1997. It is wholly owned by Petroliam Nasional Berhad (PETRONAS), Malaysia's oil and gas multinational corporation. The campus is built on 400 hectares (990 acres) in the new township of Seri Iskandar, Perak, Malaysia. The university conducts research activities in collaboration with PETRONAS on three research areas. They are energy security, sustainable lving, and regenerative futures. In 2023, the university was rated as the best university in Malaysia according to Times Higher Education World University Rankings.

== History ==
In 1997, UTP was established in Perak, Malaysia when PETRONAS was invited by the Government of Malaysia to set up a university. Setting up a university from scratch poses formidable challenges, and the first step was taken in December 1998 with the completion of the UTP academic master plan. This acted as the basis for the physical master plan studies and registration or accreditation of degree programmes. The process of master planning was completed in 2002 and the construction of the area under consideration was completed in August 2004.

== Governance ==
UTP governing body has just been restructured in Q2 of 2025.

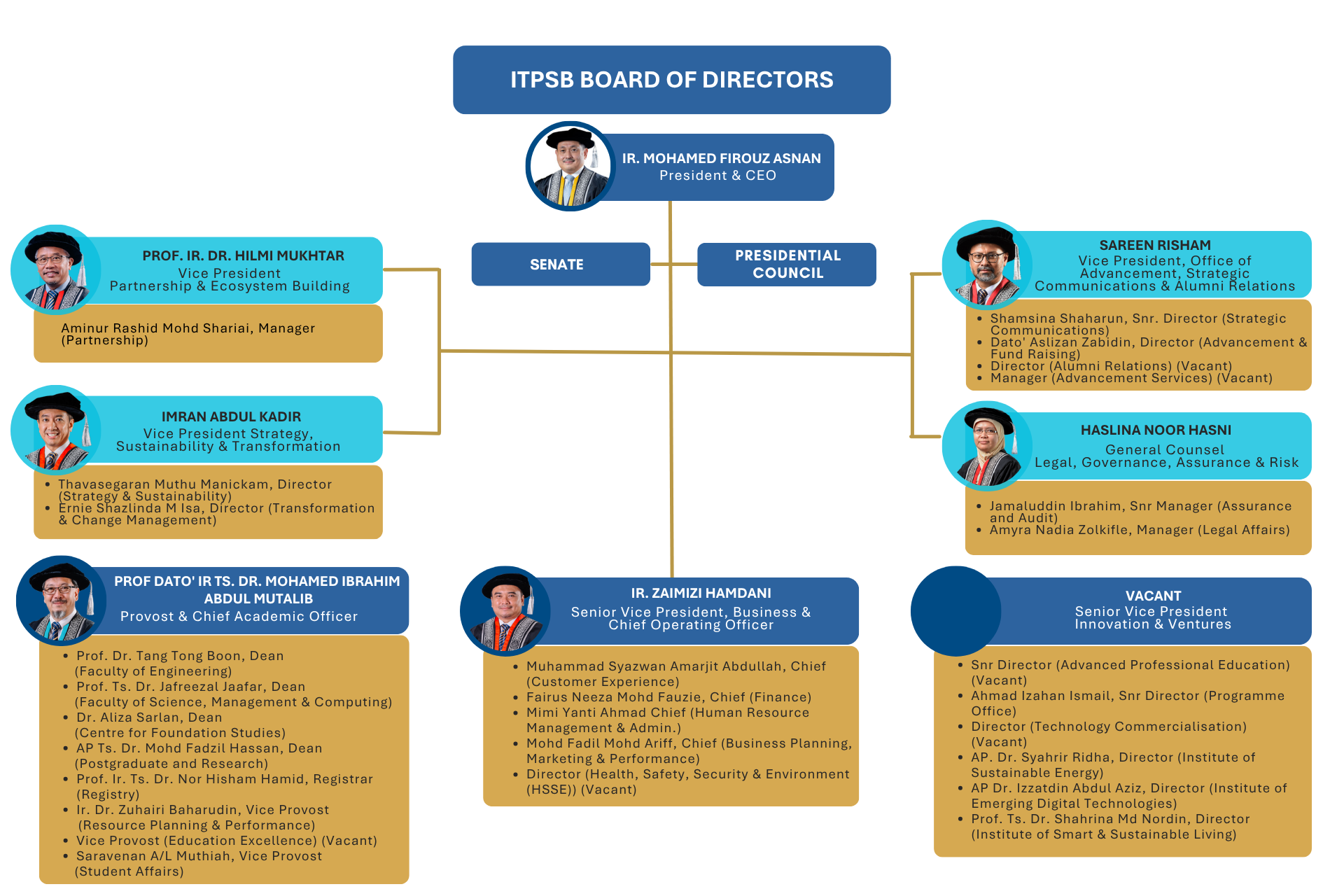
The latest governance structure and positions. (2025)

== Campus ==
The university site is located one kilometre from the village of Tronoh, a former mining town in the Perak Tengah district of Perak, the largest state on the west coast of the peninsula. The 2 site lies within the commercial corridor between Kuala Lumpur and Penang, some 10 kilometres (6.2 mi) from the town of Batu Gajah and 25 kilometres (16 mi) from the city of Ipoh. A total amount of 7.3MWp solar panel were installed at its building rooftop.

== Academic complex ==
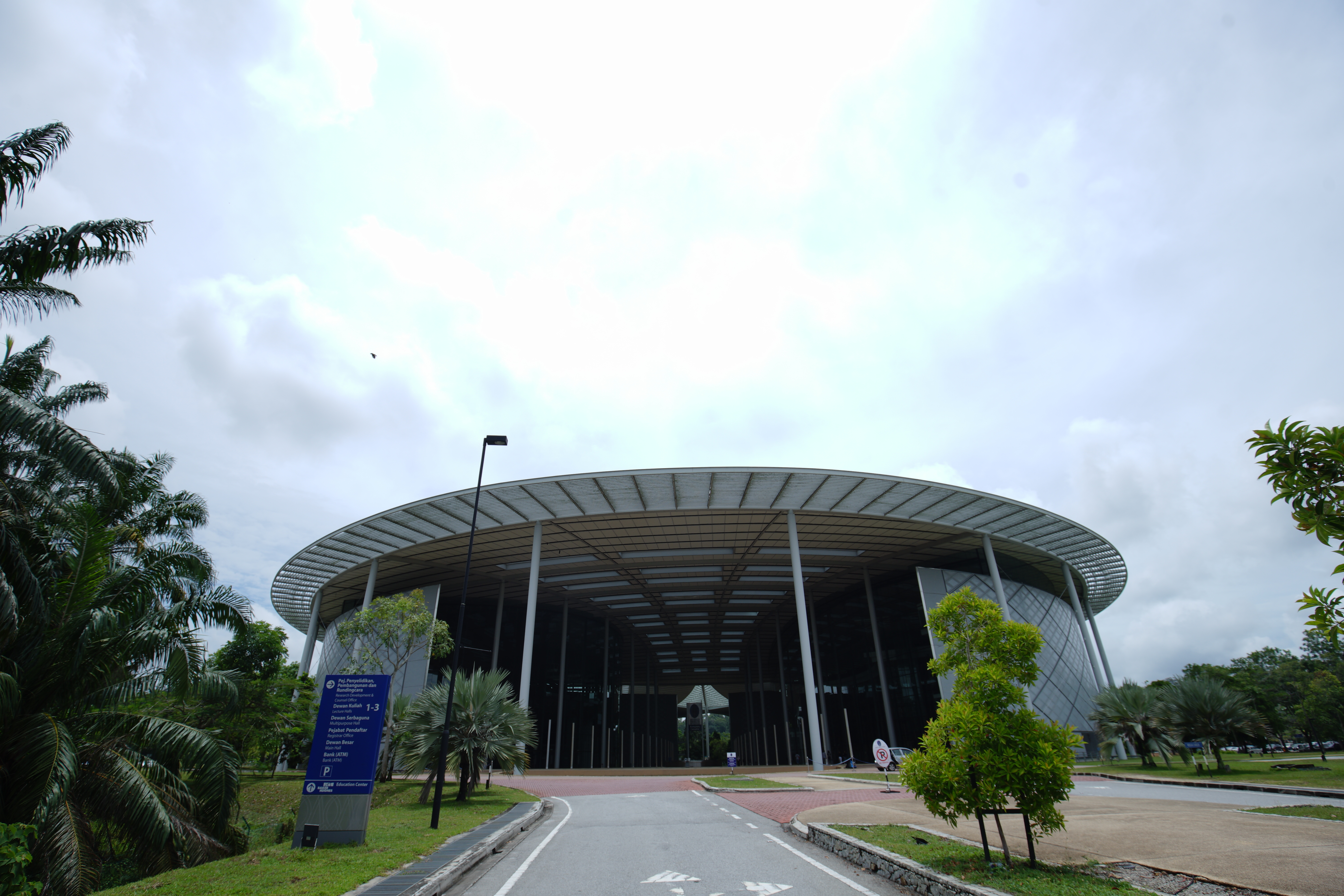

The new academic complex was designed by Foster and Partners, and the first-phase construction was completed in 2004. The design received an Aga Khan Award for Architecture in 2007. The overall layout of the new academic complex is in the shape of a five-pointed star made up by five semicircles. The new academic complex was officially opened by the former chairman of PETRONAS and ITPSB Board, YBhg Tun Azizan Zainul Abidin. Currently, almost all of the academic activities have been shifted to the new campus. A 'star concept' diagram, overlaying vision, site, programme and quality, was used as a template to zone various facilities and initiate the preliminary design.

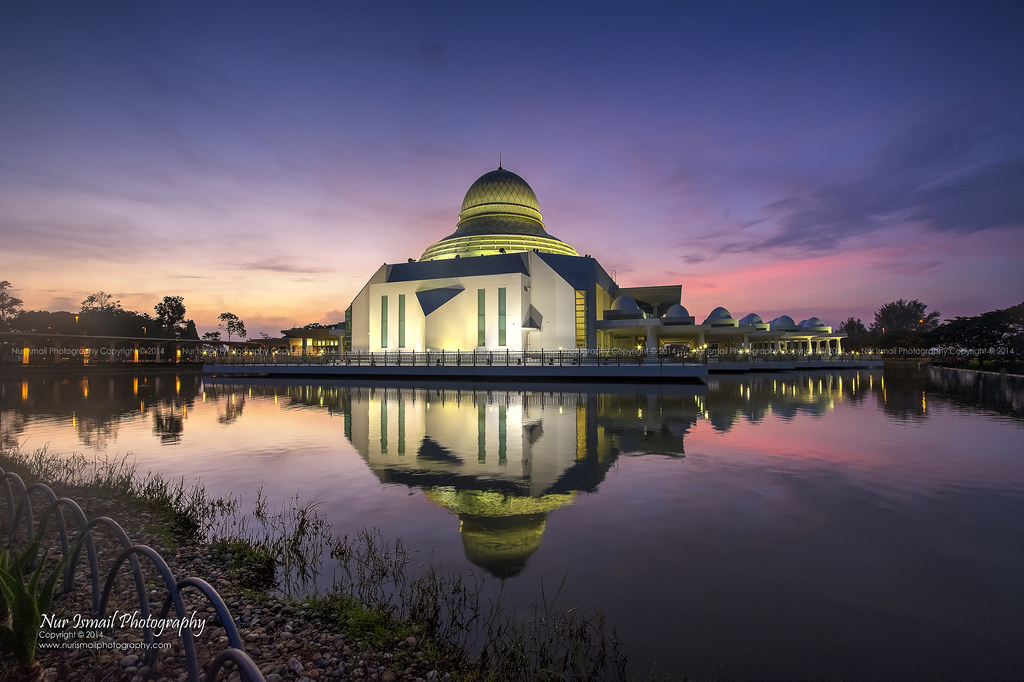
An-Nur Mosque, also known as the floating mosque, was completed in 2005

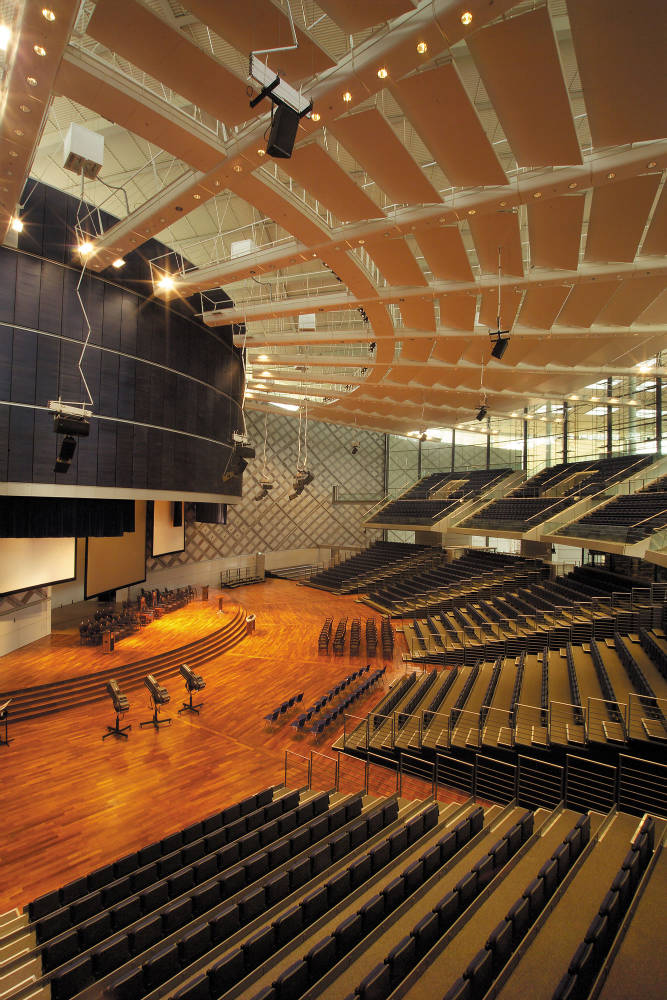
The Chancellor Hall of Universiti Teknologi PETRONAS is part of the academic complex that was designed by the British architectural design and engineering firm, Foster and Partners

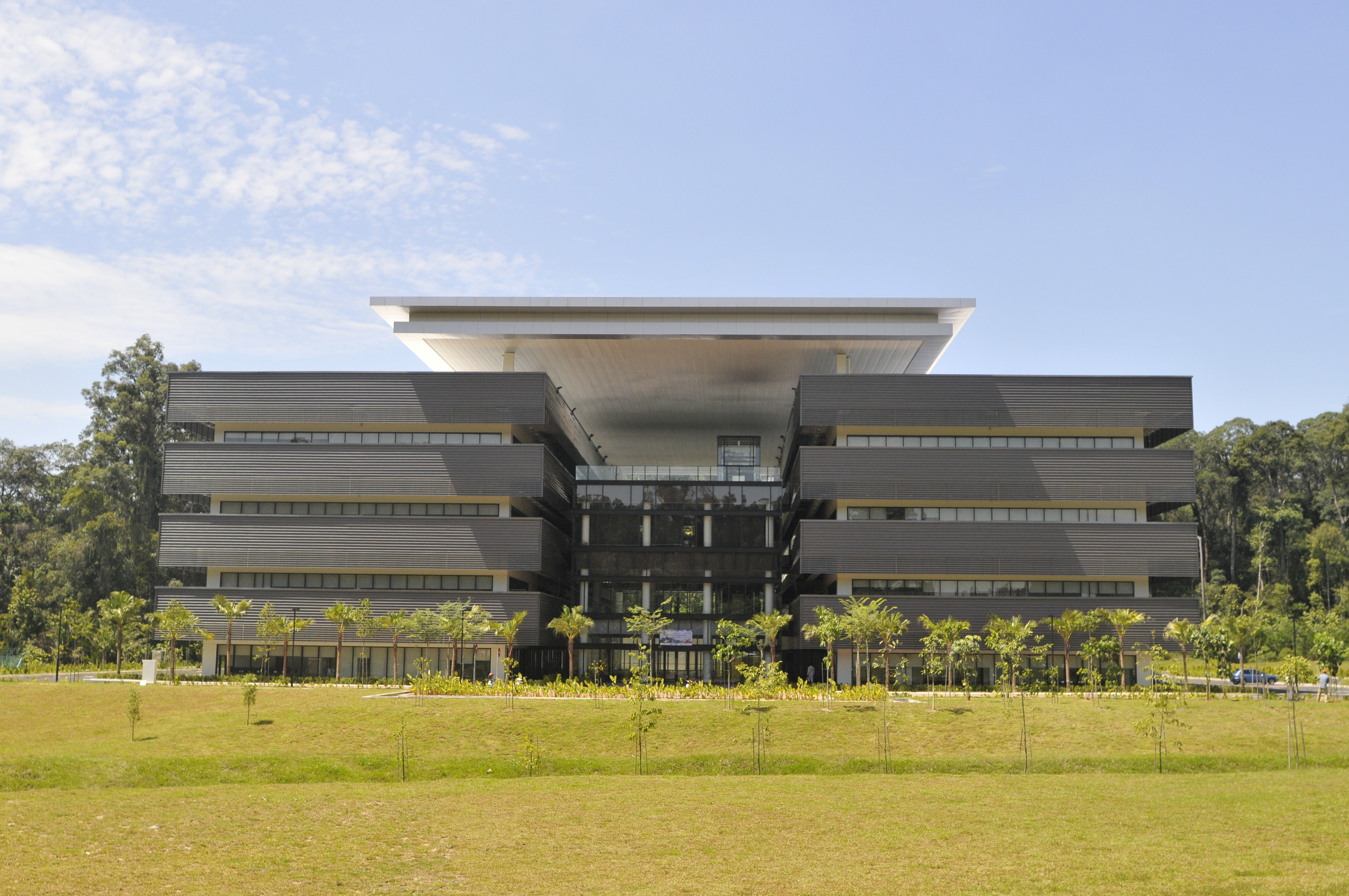
The R&D building consists of 65 laboratories and offices at every floor. It will be occupied by two main UTP Mission Oriented Research, namely Carbon Dioxide Management and Enhanced Oil Recovery.

== Notable alumni ==
- Jessica Minh Anh, supermodel
- Wan Ahmad Fayhsal, Former Deputy Minister of Youth and Sports
- Yeo Bee Yin, Former Minister of Energy, Technology, Science, Climate Change and Environment (2018–2020)

== See also ==
- List of universities in Malaysia
- PETRONAS
