= Falim =

Suburb of Ipoh, Perak, Malaysia

Coordinates: 4.581698°N 101.0592632°E

Falim (Jawi: فاليم) is a suburb of Ipoh, Perak, Malaysia.
