= Bandar Seri Botani =

Township in Ipoh, Perak, Malaysia

Coordinates: 4°22′28.2″N 103°19′53.0″E

Bandar Seri Botani (Jawi: بندر سري بوتاني) is a new township in Ipoh, Perak, Malaysia. It is located between Batu Gajah and Simpang Pulai.
