= Seri Iskandar =

Human settlement in Malaysia

- Town in Malaysia
- Bandar Seri Iskandar
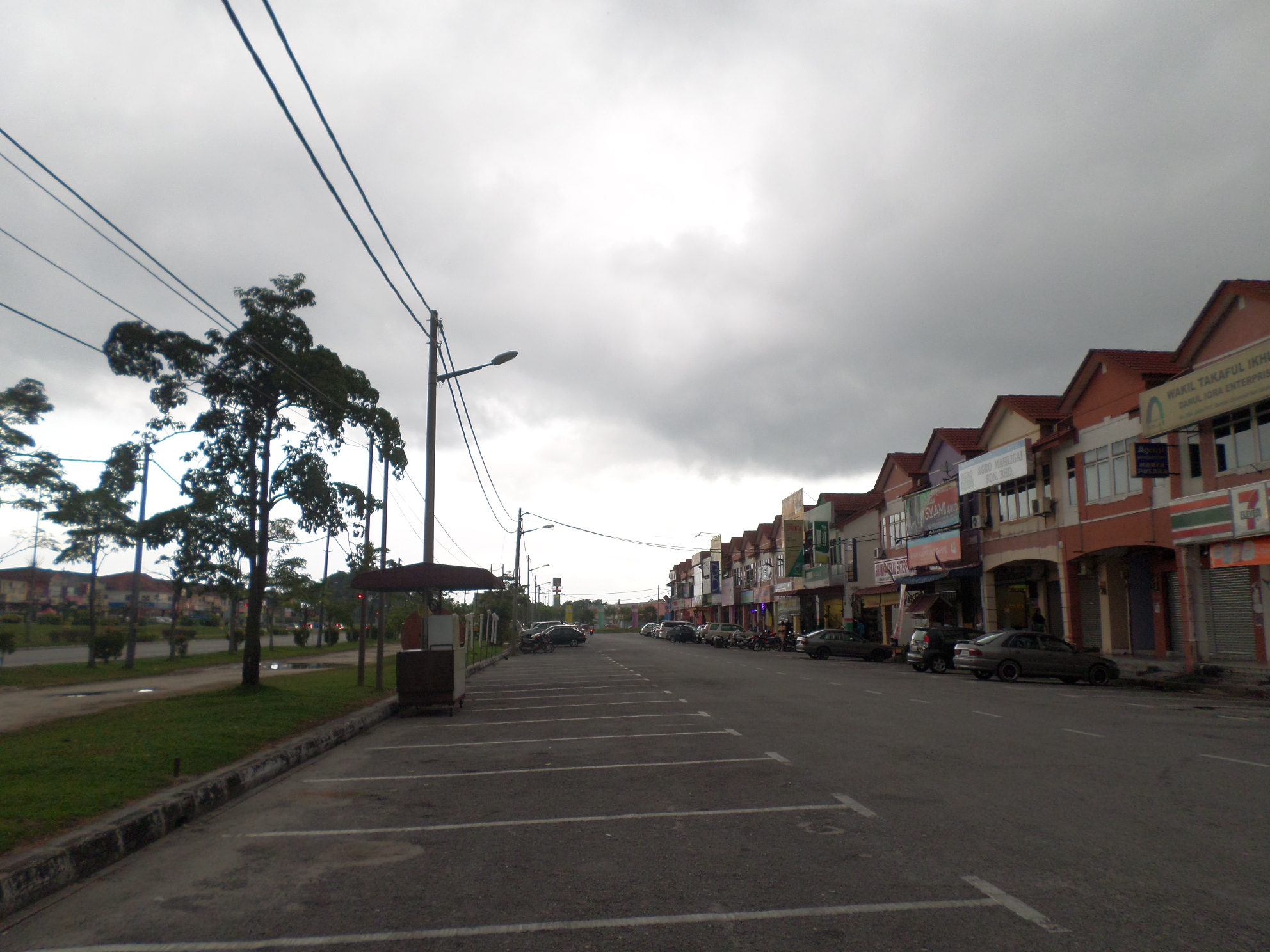
- Seri Iskandar

- Seri Iskandar in Perak, Malay Peninsular and Malaysia Seri Iskandar (Peninsular Malaysia) Seri Iskandar (Malaysia)
- Coordinates: 4°21′34.38″N 100°58′33.84″E
- Country: Malaysia
- State: Perak
- District: Perak Tengah
- Time zone: UTC+8 (MYT)
- Postal code: 31750

Seri Iskandar in Perak Tengah District

Seri Iskandar is a major town within the Perak Tengah District in the state of Perak, Malaysia. It is situated about 40 kilometers southwest of the city of Ipoh, the state capital. The town is at an average elevation of 29 meters above the sea level. The town has experienced growth and development in recent years, primarily due to the presence of two university campuses and several higher educational institutions and their associated industries. The two campuses are the main campus of Universiti Teknologi PETRONAS and a branch campus of Universiti Teknologi MARA. Other educational institutions in Seri Iskandar are Kolej Profesional MARA, Institut Kemahiran Belia Negara, Institut Latihan KEMAS and Kolej Vokasional MARA. There are also 4 primary and 2 secondary schools in the township.

As of the year 2020, the town had a total population of 14,827. Seri Iskandar offers a mix of residential areas, educational institutions, commercial establishments, and recreational facilities. It serves as an educational hub and contributes to the economic vibrancy of the region.
