= Demographics of Penang =

- Population: 1,740,405 (2020)
- Density: 1,659/km2
- Growth rate: 1.3% (2020)
- Birth rate: 11.3 births/1,000 population (2020)
- Death rate: 6.1 deaths/1,000 population (2020)
- Life expectancy: 74.2 years (2020)
  - male: 72.0 years (2020)
  - female: 76.7 years (2020)
- Fertility rate: 1.3 (2020)

Age structure
- 0–14 years: 20.1%
- 15–64 years: 73.3%
- 65 and over: 6.6%

Nationality
- Major ethnic: Chinese, Malay, Indians, Peranakans, Eurasians, Siamese

Language
- Official: Malay
- Spoken: English, Malay, Penang Hokkien, Mandarin, Tamil

Penang is a diverse multiethnic and multicultural society. Residents of the state are colloquially known as Penangites or "Penang-lang". Traditionally regarded as a Chinese-majority state, the Bumiputera population, which includes ethnic Malays, has reached parity with that of the Chinese in recent years.

As of 2020, the population of Penang stood at 1,740,405, growing by about 1.3% annually. 1,599,874, or 91.9%, were Malaysian citizens, while 140,531 were non-citizens. Ethnic Chinese, Malays and Indians cumulatively comprised nearly 91% of Penang's population. Total fertility rate was 1.3 that year.

Penang has the highest population density of all Malaysian states at 1,659/km^{2} (4,300/sq mi), as well as an urbanisation rate of 92.5%, the second highest after Selangor. Seberang Perai, Malaysia's third largest city, was home to over 54% of Penang's population, while George Town contained nearly 46%. George Town serves as the core city of the George Town Conurbation, Malaysia's second largest metropolitan area, home to a population of over 2.84 million.

Islam is the state's official religion, but Buddhism, Hinduism and Christianity are cumulatively proscribed by over half of the state's population. Within Peninsular Malaysia, Penang is the only state with a non-Muslim majority. While Malay is the official language of Malaysia, English, Mandarin and Tamil are also widely used within Penang. Penang Hokkien, a variant of the Southern Min group of languages, remains the unofficial lingua franca in the state.

The state's diversified economy has made it one of the major recipients of interstate migrants within Malaysia. Between 2015 and 2016, Penang achieved the highest migration effectiveness ratio among Malaysian states. For every 100 Malaysians that migrated into and out of Penang, the state's population increased by 58 persons. The bulk of the interstate immigrants came from Perak, Selangor, Kedah, Johor and Kuala Lumpur.

== History ==
Historical population
Year	Pop.	±%
1881	190,597	—
1891	231,224	+21.3%
1901	247,808	+7.2%
1911	270,537	+9.2%
1921	292,485	+8.1%
1931	340,259	+16.3%
1947	446,321	+31.2%
1957	572,100	+28.2%
1970	776,124	+35.7%
1980	954,638	+23.0%
1991	1,116,801	+17.0%
2000	1,313,449	+17.6%
2010	1,526,324	+16.2%
2020	1,740,405	+14.0%

Penang Island had been sparsely populated prior to the establishment of George Town. The first British visit to Penang in 1592 recorded no people on the island but did encounter a group of Orang Asli on the mainland.

Founded as an entrepot by Francis Light in 1786, George Town quickly experienced population growth fueled by immigration from various parts of Asia. At the time of George Town's establishment, Elisha Trapaud, a member of Light's landing party, described that the island was inhabited by “58 people in Malay-style houses”. Within two years, George Town's population reached 1,000, increasing to 12,000 by 1804.

An official census in 1881 showed that Penang had a population of 190,597, or about 45% of the Straits Settlements’ population. Penang continued to hold the majority of the Straits Settlements’ population until 1911, when Singapore's population surpassed Penang by 311,985 to 278,003. Within the settlement of George Town, ethnic Chinese comprised nearly 63% of the population in 1911. By 1921, the Chinese population of Penang outstripped that of the Malays by 135,288 to 110,382.

By the time Malaya gained independence in 1957, Penang held a population of more than half a million. By 1991, Penang's population had exceeded one million, with mainland Seberang Perai overtaking Penang Island in population at the same time. However, the state's population growth had begun to slow since the 1970s. In 2020, annual population growth was at 1.3%, a reduction from 2.1% in 2010.

== Population distribution ==
Population density by subdivisions in Penang, derived from the 2020 census.

As of 2020, Seberang Perai contained a population of 946,092, or more than 54% of Penang's population. This also made Seberang Perai the third largest city in Malaysia, after Kuala Lumpur and Kajang. George Town, the capital city of Penang, was home to 794,313 residents, or nearly 46% of the state's population. As George Town has a smaller land area, George Town's population density of 2,595.8/km^{2} (6,723/sq mi) was double that of Seberang Perai, which stood at 1,264.8/km^{2} (3,276/sq mi).

Within George Town, the areas with the highest density were Jelutong, Ayer Itam and Tanjong Tokong. The city centre had a population density of 6,209/km^{2} (16,080/sq mi). In Seberang Perai, Mukim 14 (Mak Mandin) recorded the highest population density, at 7,565/km^{2} (19,590/sq mi).

Population density by subdivisions in Seberang Perai
District	Subdivision	Population (2020)	Area (km^{2})	Population density (/km^{2})
North	Mukim 1	8,430	9.1	926
North	Mukim 2	6,464	16.4	394
North	Mukim 3	10,288	26.6	387
North	Mukim 4	13,366	10.5	1,273
North	Mukim 5	8,357	18	464
North	Mukim 6	53,069	39	1,361
North	Mukim 7	21,202	12.5	1,696
North	Mukim 8	18,035	12.4	1,454
North	Mukim 9	12,376	7.2	1,719
North	Mukim 10	4,746	10.8	439
North	Mukim 11	22,153	15.6	1,420
North	Mukim 12	31,160	38	820
North	Mukim 13	10,692	28	382
North	Mukim 14	21,938	2.9	7,565
North	Mukim 16	16,080	6.9	2,330
North	Butterworth	80,378	14.6	5,505
North	Kepala Batas	361	0.2	1,805
Central	Mukim 1	48,785	17.6	2,772
Central	Mukim 2	5,557	8.3	670
Central	Mukim 3	8,452	4.7	1,798
Central	Mukim 4	12,102	8.1	1,494
Central	Mukim 5	4,889	6.4	764
Central	Mukim 6	54,416	10.7	5,086
Central	Mukim 7	6,056	4.1	1,477
Central	Mukim 8	3,379	3.5	965
Central	Mukim 9	9,183	2.2	4,174
Central	Mukim 10	7,354	2	3,677
Central	Mukim 11	37,704	10.5	3,591
Central	Mukim 12	9,881	16.9	585
Central	Mukim 13	24,982	13.9	1,797
Central	Mukim 14	46,280	18.8	2,462
Central	Mukim 15	68,097	16	4,256
Central	Mukim 16	17,312	17.2	1,007
Central	Mukim 17	3,559	22.3	160
Central	Mukim 18	2,605	10.9	239
Central	Mukim 19	5,802	15.8	367
Central	Mukim 20	13,935	10.3	1,353
Central	Mukim 21	4,431	9.3	476
Central	Bukit Mertajam	12,079	4	3,020
Central	Perai	16,150	5.2	3,106
South	Mukim 1	2,405	6.1	394
South	Mukim 2	1,510	4.8	315
South	Mukim 3	1,730	10.3	168
South	Mukim 4	9,884	13.2	749
South	Mukim 5	8,711	8.9	979
South	Mukim 6	7,679	9.1	844
South	Mukim 7	20,102	18.4	1,093
South	Mukim 8	2,382	15.3	156
South	Mukim 9	18,802	16.1	1,168
South	Mukim 10	9,033	21.6	418
South	Mukim 11	19,586	45.9	427
South	Mukim 12	10,290	9.6	1,072
South	Mukim 13	11,409	29.5	387
South	Mukim 14	22,990	13.9	1,654
South	Mukim 15	35,638	18.5	1,926
South	Mukim 16	191	1.2	159
South	Nibong Tebal	1,425	0.7	2,036
South	Sungai Bakap	240	0.1	2,400

Population distribution by subdivisions in George Town
District	Subdivision	Population (2020)	Area (km^{2})	Population density (/km^{2})
Northeast	Paya Terubong	226,712	32.7	6,933
Northeast	Bukit Paya Terubong	1,998	4.9	408
Northeast	Mukim 15	13	4.8	3
Northeast	Mukim 16	1,408	3.7	381
Northeast	Mukim 17	2,579	25	103
Northeast	Mukim 18	18,217	9.2	1,980
Northeast	Ayer Itam	16,974	1.8	9,430
Northeast	Batu Ferringhi	9,046	2.3	3,933
Northeast	Penang Hill	332	3.6	92
Northeast	Gelugor	18,662	2.9	6,435
Northeast	City centre	158,336	25.5	6,209
Northeast	Jelutong	63,507	4.4	14,433
Northeast	Tanjong Bungah	14,271	2.8	5,097
Northeast	Tanjong Tokong	12,550	1.5	8,367
Northeast	Tanjong Pinang	11,970	4.5	2,660
Southwest	Pantai Acheh	4,302	23	187
Southwest	Teluk Bahang	2,531	20.4	124
Southwest	Bukit Sungai Pinang	1,919	6.2	310
Southwest	Batu Hitam	3,574	10	357
Southwest	Bukit Balik Pulau	1,282	5.2	247
Southwest	Pondok Upih	7,679	8.9	863
Southwest	Bukit Genting	1,509	6.1	247
Southwest	Bukit Pasir Panjang	1,444	5.6	258
Southwest	Bukit Gemuruh	17,379	9.6	1,810
Southwest	Bukit Relau	18,755	11.5	1,631
Southwest	Teluk Kumbar	21,481	6.8	3,159
Southwest	Bayan Lepas	130,455	31.9	4,089
Southwest	Sungai Pinang	2,323	2	1,162
Southwest	Sungai Rusa	2,817	4.2	671
Southwest	Permatang Pasir	2,439	6	407
Southwest	Bagan Air Hitam	3,382	3.6	939
Southwest	Titi Teras	2,394	3.6	665
Southwest	Kongsi	2,730	1	2,730
Southwest	Kampung Paya	3,981	1	3,981
Southwest	Sungai Burung	1,523	2.9	525
Southwest	Pulau Betong	1,551	3.9	398
Southwest	Dataran Genting	2,179	2.2	990
Southwest	Balik Pulau	109	0.1	1,090

== Age distribution ==
Age distribution in Penang, 2025
Race	Malay	Other Bumiputera	Chinese	Indian	Others
Total	741,400	7,300	709,100	154,800	10,300
0-4	55,900	500	20,900	7,600	400
5-9	50,200	600	38,900	8,700	700
10-14	49,500	500	47,500	10,200	600
15-19	49,400	500	50,000	12,100	800
20-24	61,000	500	47,100	13,100	700
25-29	69,400	300	51,300	13,100	1,200
30-34	71,000	900	55,800	13,200	1,100
35-39	71,400	800	48,700	12,000	600
40-44	65,700	700	54,600	12,600	500
45-49	47,200	500	51,600	10,500	800
50-54	42,900	400	52,600	10,400	800
55-59	35,800	300	52,300	9,400	600
60-64	29,000	200	45,900	8,600	500
65+	43,100	400	92,000	13,300	1,000

== Ethnicities ==
Ethnic composition of Penang in 2020
Ethnicity	Population
Chinese	718,362
Malay	707,861
Other Bumiputeras	8,038
Indian	155,492
Others	10,121
Non-citizens	140,531
Total	1,740,405

Ethnic composition of Seberang Perai in 2020
Ethnicity	Population
Malay	463,633
Other Bumiputeras	3,186
Chinese	311,569
Indian	90,677
Others	3,783
Non-citizens	73,244
Total	946,092

Population by ethnic groups in Seberang Perai
District	Subdivision	Population (2020)						
District	Subdivision	Malaysian citizens					Non-citizens	Total
District	Subdivision	Malay	Other Bumiputeras	Chinese	Indian	Others	Non-citizens	Total
North	Mukim 1	8,067	8	201	59	5	90	8,430
North	Mukim 2	5,997	4	383	4	3	73	6,464
North	Mukim 3	9,756	19	241	66	15	191	10,288
North	Mukim 4	12,898	26	182	41	13	206	13,366
North	Mukim 5	7,352	8	591	150	43	213	8,357
North	Mukim 6	41,757	114	5,778	3,333	117	1,970	53,069
North	Mukim 7	15,062	63	4,024	1,347	48	658	21,202
North	Mukim 8	15,885	16	395	196	43	1,500	18,035
North	Mukim 9	3,573	97	6,451	1,535	135	585	12,376
North	Mukim 10	4,701	1	18	5	2	19	4,746
North	Mukim 11	14,783	53	6,275	786	51	205	22,153
North	Mukim 12	24,257	83	3,921	1,434	70	1,395	31,160
North	Mukim 13	9,587	14	68	280	9	734	10,692
North	Mukim 14	804	75	18,990	1,139	108	822	21,938
North	Mukim 16	8,697	41	6,477	730	28	107	16,080
North	Butterworth	19,346	219	41,489	11,360	367	7,597	80,378
North	Kepala Batas	129	0	131	100	0	1	361
Central	Mukim 1	22,147	142	11,078	7,593	426	7,399	48,785
Central	Mukim 2	3,496	3	1,910	63	3	82	5,557
Central	Mukim 3	7,847	6	435	104	14	46	8,452
Central	Mukim 4	6,269	24	4,714	831	31	233	12,102
Central	Mukim 5	4,488	8	293	21	8	71	4,889
Central	Mukim 6	39,387	232	5,012	1,918	292	7,575	54,416
Central	Mukim 7	4,767	46	967	200	16	60	6,056
Central	Mukim 8	3,124	2	154	8	4	87	3,379
Central	Mukim 9	3,575	16	5,285	222	16	69	9,183
Central	Mukim 10	1,591	22	4,730	873	23	115	7,354
Central	Mukim 11	7,611	175	16,824	3,092	384	9,618	37,704
Central	Mukim 12	4,991	18	3,376	760	48	688	9,881
Central	Mukim 13	7,223	81	8,968	3,196	206	5,308	24,982
Central	Mukim 14	12,571	95	24,347	4,390	234	4,643	46,280
Central	Mukim 15	16,075	176	37,786	7,842	241	5,977	68,097
Central	Mukim 16	9,080	38	6,585	1,233	35	341	17,312
Central	Mukim 17	809	9	2,395	320	10	16	3,559
Central	Mukim 18	1,840	3	690	16	6	50	2,605
Central	Mukim 19	5,364	4	288	27	61	58	5,802
Central	Mukim 20	12,341	19	1,254	203	21	97	13,935
Central	Mukim 21	4,376	2	6	2	4	41	4,431
Central	Bukit Mertajam	2,536	31	8,194	981	67	270	12,079
Central	Perai	4,012	57	5,349	4,089	91	2,552	16,150
South	Mukim 1	2,144	3	212	13	5	28	2,405
South	Mukim 2	1,476	1	0	0	1	32	1,510
South	Mukim 3	431	1	1,035	238	4	21	1,730
South	Mukim 4	2,136	8	6,071	1,197	32	440	9,884
South	Mukim 5	6,257	12	1,121	1,210	12	99	8,711
South	Mukim 6	6,082	27	525	968	13	64	7,679
South	Mukim 7	8,348	48	7,063	3,862	36	745	20,102
South	Mukim 8	2,074	4	157	138	0	9	2,382
South	Mukim 9	10,724	45	5,770	1,986	58	219	18,802
South	Mukim 10	6,659	17	1,939	305	11	102	9,033
South	Mukim 11	5,766	22	8,682	4,851	52	213	19,586
South	Mukim 12	1,148	0	1,356	506	9	7,271	10,290
South	Mukim 13	6,861	17	1,735	2,114	36	646	11,409
South	Mukim 14	5,259	24	11,642	5,124	104	837	22,990
South	Mukim 15	10,556	92	16,935	7,199	111	745	35,638
South	Mukim 16	191	0	0	0	0	0	191
South	Nibong Tebal	118	0	929	367	1	10	1,425
South	Sungai Bakap	46	1	142	50	0	1	240

Ethnic composition of George Town in 2020
Ethnicity	Population
Chinese	406,793
Malay	244,228
Other Bumiputeras	4,852
Indian	64,815
Others	6,338
Non-citizens	67,287
Total	794,313

Population by ethnic groups in George Town
District	Subdivision	Population (2020)						
District	Subdivision	Malaysian citizens					Non-citizens	Total
District	Subdivision	Malay	Other Bumiputeras	Chinese	Indian	Others	Non-citizens	Total
Northeast	Paya Terubong	52,182	1,593	127,513	21,305	2,299	21,820	226,712
Northeast	Bukit Paya Terubong	59	7	1,642	83	9	198	1,998
Northeast	Mukim 15	0	0	12	0	0	1	13
Northeast	Mukim 16	60	6	1,168	140	14	20	1,408
Northeast	Mukim 17	176	3	1,653	231	58	458	2,579
Northeast	Mukim 18	1,469	64	12,444	2,318	239	1,683	18,217
Northeast	Ayer Itam	2,071	48	12,316	1,903	57	579	16,974
Northeast	Batu Ferringhi	1,964	38	4,128	1,408	80	1,428	9,046
Northeast	Penang Hill	6	1	42	20	7	256	332
Northeast	Gelugor	8,814	281	6,173	2,406	93	895	18,662
Northeast	City centre	31,775	880	90,589	13,996	1,169	19,927	158,336
Northeast	Jelutong	11,570	260	44,458	5,109	544	1,566	63,507
Northeast	Tanjong Bungah	1,466	56	10,028	1,103	306	1,312	14,271
Northeast	Tanjong Tokong	4,217	42	6,852	729	115	595	12,550
Northeast	Tanjong Pinang	2,773	19	5,925	769	280	2,204	11,970
Southwest	Pantai Acheh	2,940	2	1,073	229	10	48	4,302
Southwest	Teluk Bahang	2,139	13	290	43	4	42	2,531
Southwest	Bukit Sungai Pinang	1,466	3	399	25	3	23	1,919
Southwest	Batu Hitam	1,302	15	1,932	241	17	67	3,574
Southwest	Bukit Balik Pulau	295	2	772	103	2	108	1,282
Southwest	Pondok Upih	4,981	36	2,288	248	28	98	7,679
Southwest	Bukit Genting	1,256	2	232	2	1	16	1,509
Southwest	Bukit Pasir Panjang	623	1	783	18	1	18	1,444
Southwest	Bukit Gemuruh	14,288	57	2,333	471	52	178	17,379
Southwest	Bukit Relau	6,485	122	10,618	1,067	99	364	18,755
Southwest	Teluk Kumbar	14,532	116	4,680	1,079	99	975	21,481
Southwest	Bayan Lepas	55,058	599	52,681	9,172	705	12,240	130,455
Southwest	Sungai Pinang	1,504	0	808	8	2	1	2,323
Southwest	Sungai Rusa	2,324	1	470	3	1	18	2,817
Southwest	Permatang Pasir	2,204	6	194	20	1	14	2,439
Southwest	Bagan Air Hitam	2,393	13	798	131	5	42	3,382
Southwest	Titi Teras	2,121	12	148	102	4	7	2,394
Southwest	Kongsi	2,022	34	522	116	15	21	2,730
Southwest	Kampung Paya	3,291	8	501	152	8	21	3,981
Southwest	Sungai Burung	1,507	1	1	0	2	12	1,523
Southwest	Pulau Betong	1,524	1	5	6	3	12	1,551
Southwest	Dataran Genting	1,852	17	239	46	6	19	2,179
Southwest	Balik Pulau	12	0	83	13	0	1	109

=== Race Population in Penang ===
Source: https://www.dosm.gov.my/uploads/release-content/file_20260731083618.pdf

Race Population in Penang, 2020–2026
Race	Malay	Other Bumiputera	Chinese	Indian	Others	Total
2020	707,900 (44.3%)	8,000 (0.5%)	718,400 (44.9%)	155,500 (9.7%)	10,100 (0.6%)	1,599,900
2021	715,300 (44.5%)	6,900 (0.4%)	718,200 (44.7%)	155,500 (9.7%)	10,200 (0.6%)	1,606,100
2022	721,400 (44.8%)	7,000 (0.4%)	715,200 (44.5%)	155,100 (9.6%)	10,200 (0.6%)	1,608,900
2023	728,800 (45.1%)	7,100 (0.4%)	713,200 (44.2%)	155,100 (9.6%)	10,200 (0.6%)	1,614,400
2024	735,800 (45.4%)	7,200 (0.4%)	711,200 (43.9%)	155,000 (9.6%)	10,300 (0.6%)	1,619,500
2025	741,400 (45.7%)	7,300 (0.5%)	709,100 (43.7%)	154,800 (9.5%)	10,300 (0.6%)	1,622,900
2026	747,400 (46%)	7,400 (0.5%)	706,300 (43.4%)	154,700 (9.5%)	10,300 (0.6%)	1,626,000

==== TFR by ethnic group ====
	Malays	Chinese	Indians	Total
2011	2.1	1.4	1.7	1.6
2012	2.1	1.6	1.7	1.7
2013	2.0	1.3	1.5	1.5
2014	2.0	1.4	1.5	1.6
2015	2.0	1.3	1.5	1.5
2016	1.9	1.2	1.4	1.4
2017	1.9	1.2	1.3	1.4
2018	1.8	1.1	1.2	1.3
2019	1.7	1.1	1.2	1.3
2020	1.7	1	1.3	1.3
2021	1.7	0.8	1.2	1.2
2022	1.6	0.7	1.2	1.2
2023	1.8	0.8	1.3	1.3
2024	1.6	0.8	0.9	1.2

==== Demographics of Parliamentary consistuency by ethnic group ====
	Malays	Chinese	Indians	Total	Member of Parliament	
P.041 Kepala Batas	98,067 (87.2%)	10,113 (9.0%)	4,075 (3.6%)	112,072	Siti Mastura Muhammad	PN (PAS)
P.042 Tasek Gelugor	81,040 (78.2%)	17,238 (16.6%)	5,056 (4.9%)	103,644	Wan Saifulruddin Wan Jan	PN (WAWASAN)
P.043 Bagan	22,534 (21.6%)	68,198 (65.5%)	12,916 (12.4%)	103,648	Lim Guan Eng	PH (DAP)
P.044 Permatang Pauh	117,858 (78.4%)	23,377 (15.6%)	8,378 (5.6%)	149,613	Muhammad Fawwaz Mohamad Jan	PN (PAS)
P.045 Bukit Mertajam	43,049 (27.9%)	94,670 (61.3%)	16,137 (10.4%)	153,856	Steven Sim Chee Keong	PH (DAP)
P.046 Batu Kawan	43,604 (34.2%)	58,263 (45.7%)	24,469 (19.2%)	126,336	Chow Kon Yeow	PH (DAP)
P.047 Nibong Tebal	60,667 (50.4%)	39,710 (33.0%)	19,646 (16.3%)	120,023	Fadhlina Sidek	PH (PKR)
P.048 Bukit Bendera	19,633 (17.9%)	76,866 (70.0%)	11,523 (10.5%)	108,022	Syerleena Abdul Rashid	PH (DAP)
P.049 Tanjong	4,304 (16.9%)	18,052 (71.0%)	2,900 (11.4%)	25,256	Lim Hui Ying	PH (DAP)
P.050 Jelutong	29,207 (26.7%)	68,211 (62.4%)	11,063 (10.1%)	108,481	Sanisvara Nethaji Rayer Rajaji Rayer	PH (DAP)
P.051 Bukit Gelugor	40,685 (22.5%)	120,896 (66.8%)	17,906 (9.9%)	179,487	Ramkarpal Singh	PH (DAP)
P.052 Bukit Gelugor	73,020 (42.4%)	81,927 (47.5%)	15,923 (9.2%)	170,870	Sim Tze Tzin	PH (PKR)
P.053 Balik Pulau	82,231 (63.7%)	40,841 (31.6%)	5,500 (4.3%)	128,572	Muhammad Bakhtiar Wan Chik	PH (PKR)

=== Maps ===
Distribution of ethnic Chinese

Distribution of ethnic Malays

Distribution of ethnic Indians

Distribution of non-citizens

==== Chinese ====
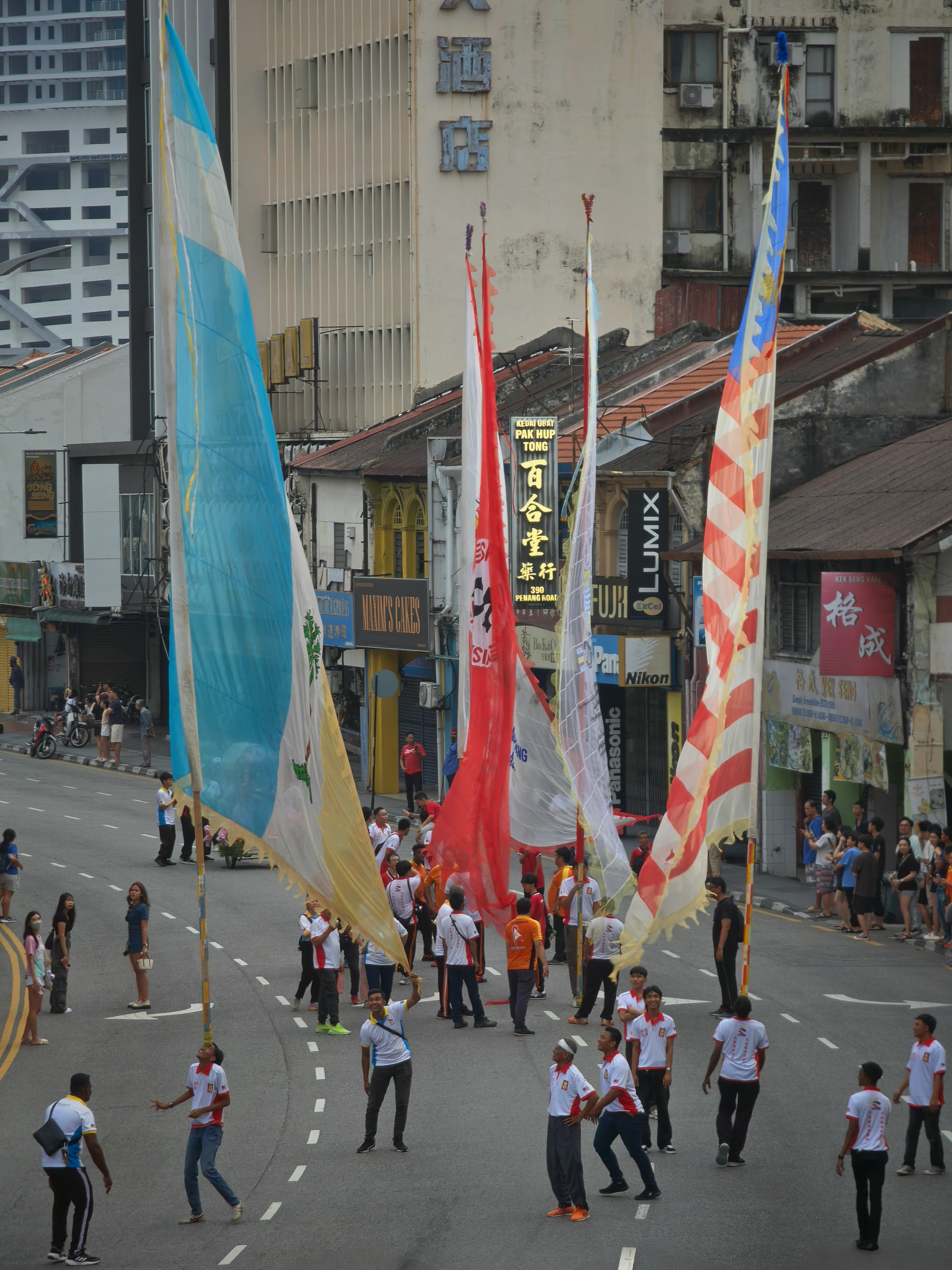
The Chingay parade is perceived as a major form of expression of the Penang Chinese identity.

Ethnic Chinese immigrants and traders had arrived on Penang Island in the years immediately after the founding of George Town. Francis Light noted in his diary on 18 July 1786, one day after his arrival on the island, that a group of Chinese led by a “Captain China” presented him with a gift of fishing nets. Chinese settlers began arriving at what is now the city centre and Tanjong Tokong. Light regarded the Chinese as "a valuable acquisition" and "the only people of the [E]ast from whom a revenue [might] be raised without expense and extraordinary efforts of government". Under his successor George Alexander William Leith, the Chinese population grew to approximately 6,000, with the wealthier class owning "valuable estates, in land and houses", while artisans, labourers, fishermen and market. Gardeners commanded high wages because they were "laboriously good workmen".

The Peranakan Chinese soon evolved as an influential sub-group within George Town's Chinese community. Descendants of mixed Malay and Chinese ancestries who had inhabited the region for generations, the Peranakans adopted Malay socio-cultural traditions in terms of cuisine, attire and language, amalgamated with Chinese beliefs. There was a distinct preference for English-medium education and consequently, the Peranakans were known as the "King's Chinese" for their loyalty to the British Crown rather than China. They also retained significant influence in the city's commercial and societal spheres.

The Peranakans were distinct from waves of newer arrivals from China, known colloquially as “sin-kheh”. Originating from Fujian and Guangdong provinces, the “sin-kheh” were divided along dialect lines, establishing clan associations to assist new arrivals in accommodation, protection and employment. The Hokkiens and the Teochews formed the bulk of the new arrivals, and dominated trade, real estate, large plantation-scale commercial agriculture, and retail shopkeeping. The Cantonese arrived in smaller numbers, but were considered more hardy and robust, and they predominated as artisans and traders. Other dialect groups included the Hakkas and the Hainanese. The waves of Chinese immigration also created predominantly Chinese areas within George Town such as the Clan Jetties, while in mainland Province Wellesley (now Seberang Perai), cash crop industries attracted Teochew planters to areas like Bukit Mertajam, Bukit Tambun and Batu Kawan.

==== Malay ====
Native merchants from Sumatra and the Malay Peninsula actively traded in Penang following the establishment of George Town. Malay merchants traded rattan, agricultural produce such as sago, rice, pepper, spices, ivory, ebony, tin and gold, in exchange for European goods. On the island, Malays originally resided at the outskirts of the new settlement, such as at the Pinang River, Jalan Perak, Dato Keramat Road, Batu Uban and Teluk Duyung. By 1798, a "Malay town" had emerged to the south of Acheen Street.

In Province Wellesley (now Seberang Perai), Malays were primarily engaged in rural subsistence rice farming and coastal fishing. The Siamese invasion of neighbouring Kedah in 1821 forced an influx of Malay refugees into Province Wellesley, leading to an increase in the mainland territory's population to approximatelt 67,000 by 1858.

Apart from indigenous Malays, Penang also attracted immigrants from Sumatra and Java. Pepper trade drew in merchants from Aceh, which gradually assimilated with the local Malay community through commercial ties and intermarriages. Acehnese prominence in the pepper trade led to the emergence of a Malay Muslim entrepreneurial enclave centred at Acheen Street. Meanwhile, early Javanese settlers in Penang were engaged as workers in the spice and sugar plantations in Province Wellesley, as well as at the Eastern Smelting Company, George Town's sole tin smelting company. Dutch restrictions limited Javanese immigration to Penang, and the Javanese community in the colony was similarly assimilated into the wider Malay group.

Local academics and politicians allege that in the decades following Malaya's independence, rapid development and rising living costs have resulted in the displacement of ethnic Malays from the city centre of George Town to mainland Seberang Perai. By 1975, the majority of the land within the city centre was estimated to be owned by ethnic Chinese. This led to underlying communal tensions, with Malay organisations such as the United Malays National Organisation (UMNO) and the Penang Malays Association (Pemenang) aggressively advocating for development initiatives specifically tailored to Malays. Proposals have been made to establish a Malay enclave within downtown George Town, raising concerns about potential shifts in voting patterns.

==== Indian ====
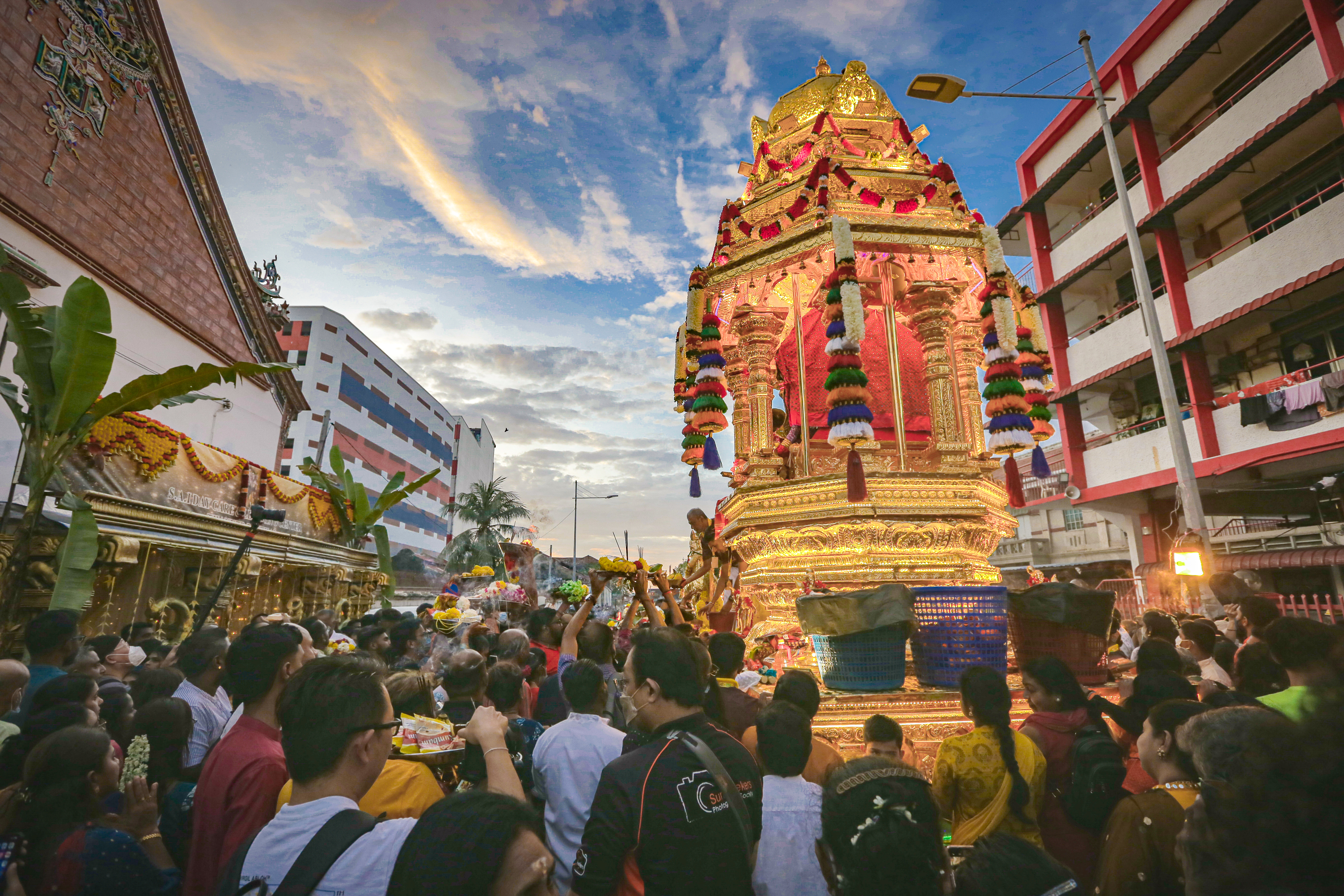
In George Town, Thaipusam is celebrated with processions taking place throughout the city.

Convicts from the Indian subcontinent were brought to Penang soon after the founding of George Town for public works. The transfer of convicts to Penang increased with the designation of Penang as a penal station in 1795, replacing Port Blair in the Andaman Islands. These arrivals were joined by soldiers from Madras – both Hindu and Muslim – who were deployed as Penang's garrison force. Commercial links with the Indian subcontinent also attracted merchants and labourers from Mumbai and Coromandel to Penang; the south Indian Muslim traders from the latter were referred to as “Chuliahs” by Francis Light himself.

North Indian arrivals included Bengalis, Parsees, Punjabis, Sindhis and Gujeratis. The northern Indians and Indian Muslims were prominently involved in wholesaling, retail and distribution trade. However, the Tamils of southern India soon formed the bulk of the Indian community in Penang. Tamils primarily worked as labourers, stevedores, plantation workers and in petty trading. Money lending also became the forte of the “chettiar”, a Hindu clan.

George Town has long been a home to the distinct Jawi Peranakan community, which descended from intermarriages between Indians and local Malay womenfolk, particularly from Kedah. The Jawi Peranakan traditionally dominated in money changing, jewellery, newspaper distribution, publishing, petty trading, and bakery and bread distributions. Staple dishes of the Jawi Peranakans such as nasi kandar and mee goreng have become among the more popular foods in Penang to this day.

==== Eurasian ====
Penang is home to a small Eurasian community, largely clustered around Kampung Serani in George Town. Descended from intermarriages between Europeans and Asians, Eurasians made up among the earliest immigrants to Penang; in 1786, soon after the establishment of George Town, a group of Eurasians from Kuala Kedah settled at China Street and Bishop Street. In the 1910s, another community of Eurasians from Phuket settled at what is now Kampung Serani. Those of Portuguese ancestry proscribed to the Catholic faith, while those with Anglo-Dutch lineage tended to be Protestants. The Eurasians in Penang share a common affinity with the Peranakan Chinese due to their mixed ancestries and their Western-oriented educational background, which also allowed the Eurasians to serve in clerical positions in the colonial bureaucracy, European businesses and the professions.

==== Siamese ====
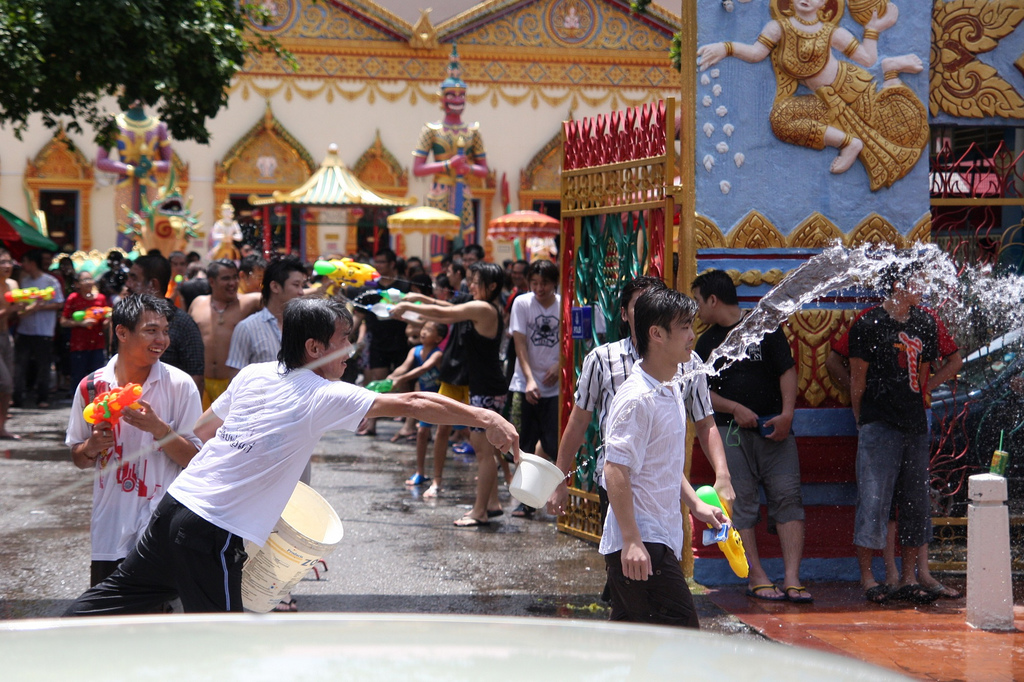
Revellers celebrating Songkran at Wat Chayamangkalaram in George Town.

Kampung Siam in George Town is an enclave established by Siamese immigrants, centred around Wat Chayamangkalaram. The area had been cleared in 1795 and by 1830, there were 648 Siamese and Burmese residents in the new settlement. Siamese and Burmese settlers worked in cash crop plantations and petty trade. Intermarriages were common between the two ethnicities and the Chinese.

The close links between Siam and Penang were retained into the 20th century. In 1915, King Rama VI visited George Town, during which he laid the foundation stone of the Kek Lok Si's pagoda. In 1962, King Bhumibol Adulyadej unveiled the Reclining Buddha statue within Wat Chayamangkalaram, in a ceremony attended by thousands of local residents. To this day, Thailand maintains a consulate at Pulau Tikus, within the vicinity of Kampung Siam.

== Religion ==
Religions in Penang in 2020
Religion	Population
Islam	792,187
Buddhism	654,808
Hinduism	145,871
Christianity	75,345
Other	42,025
No religion	30,169
Total	1,740,405

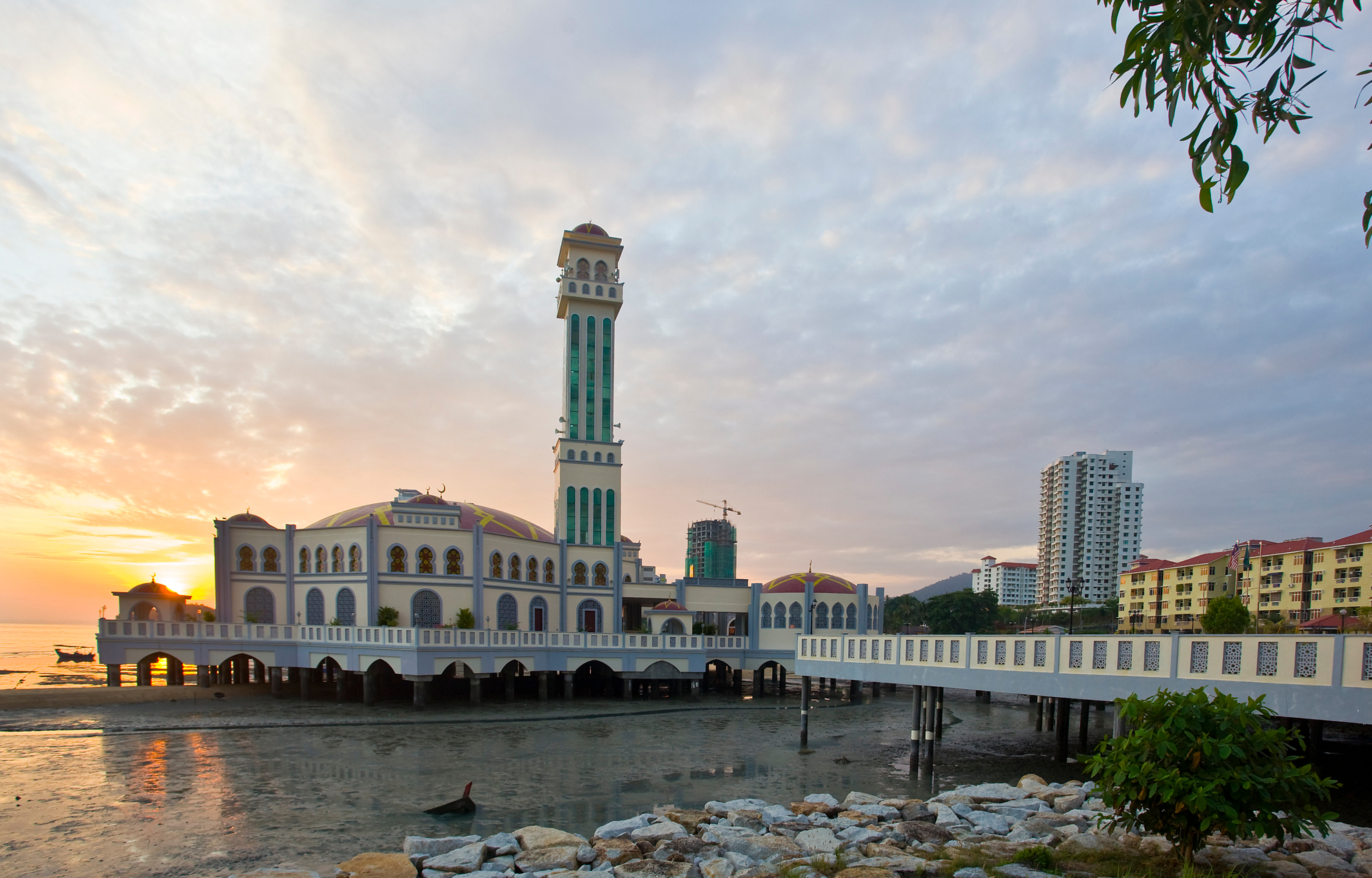
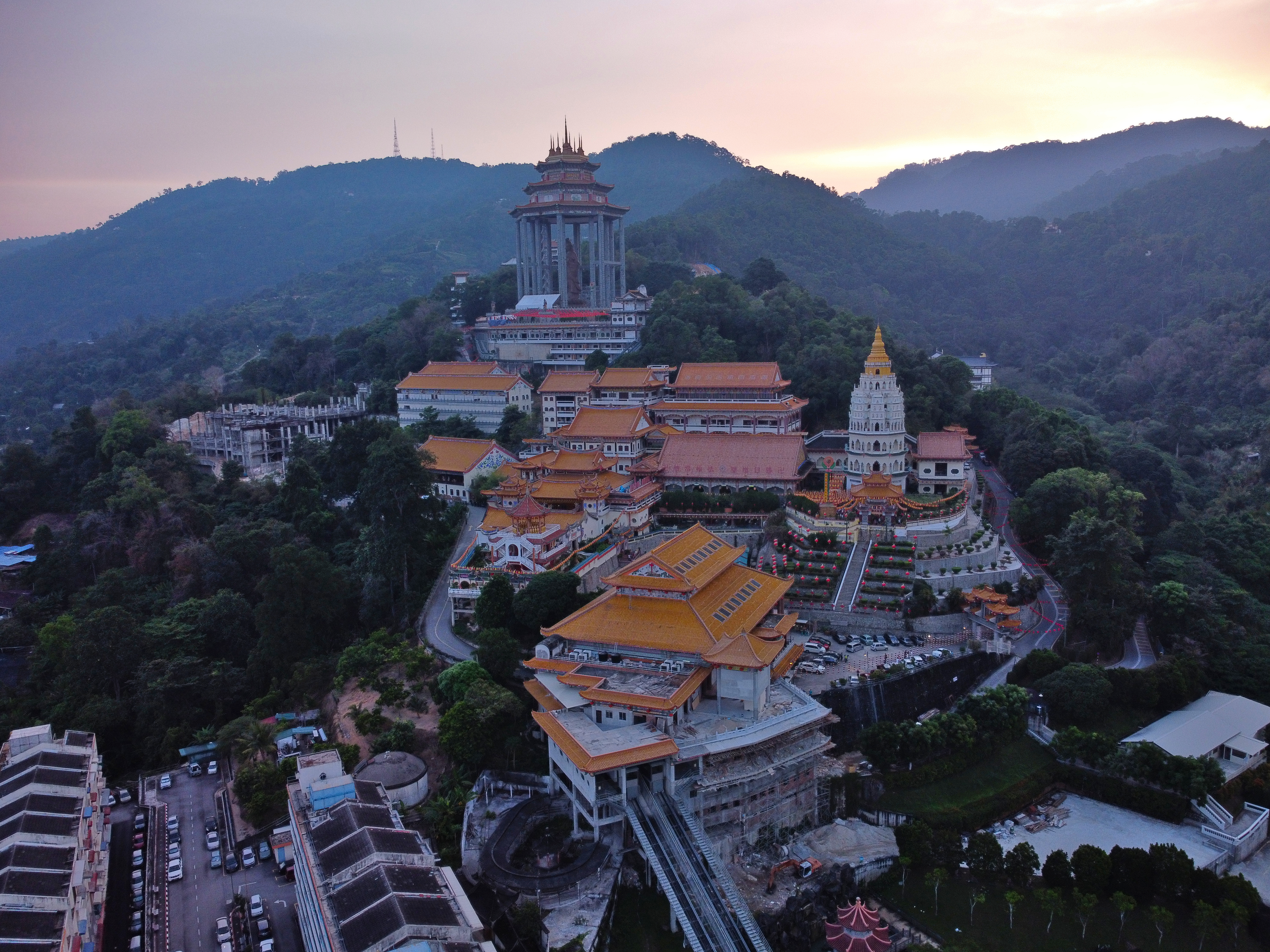
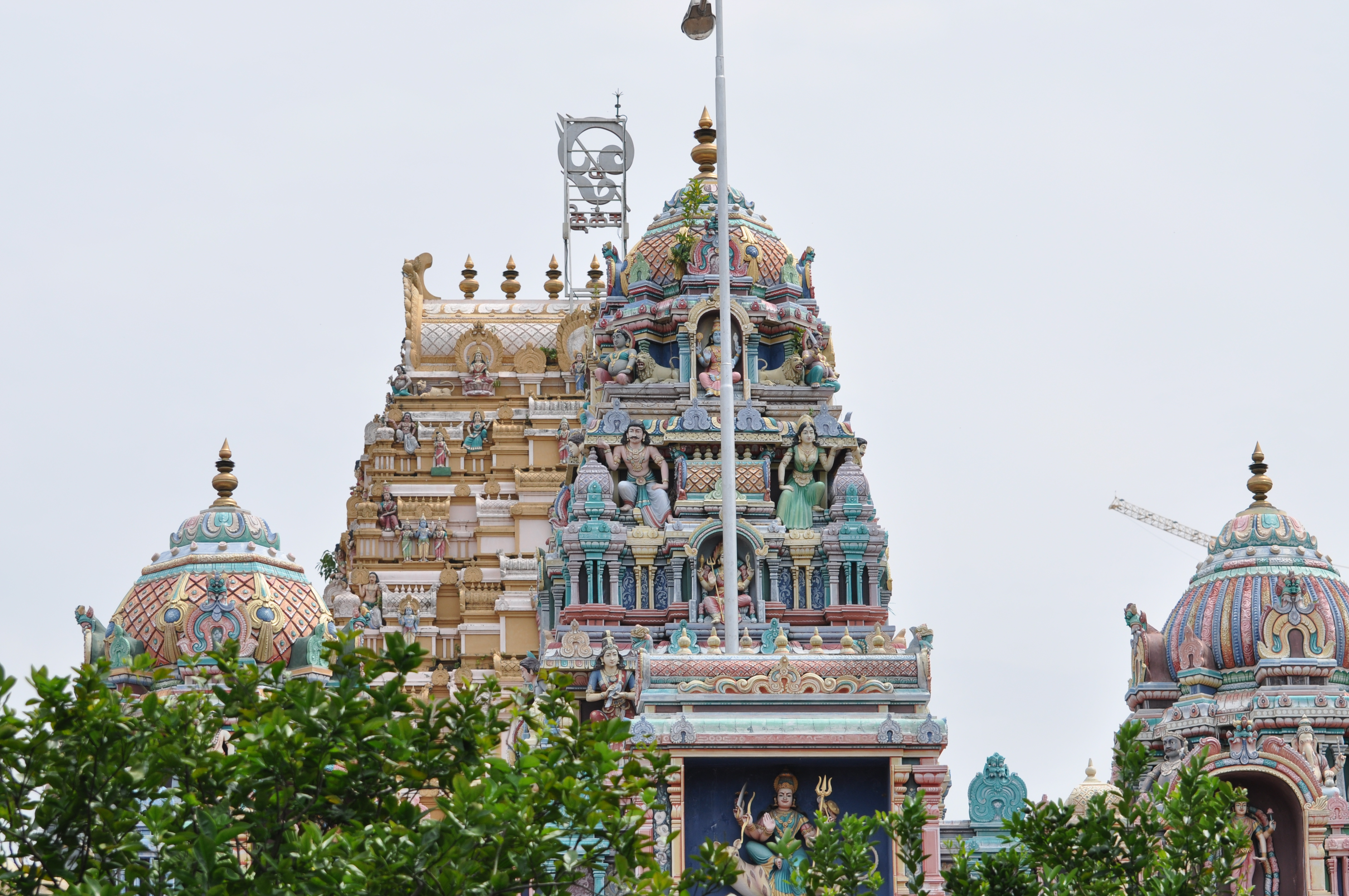
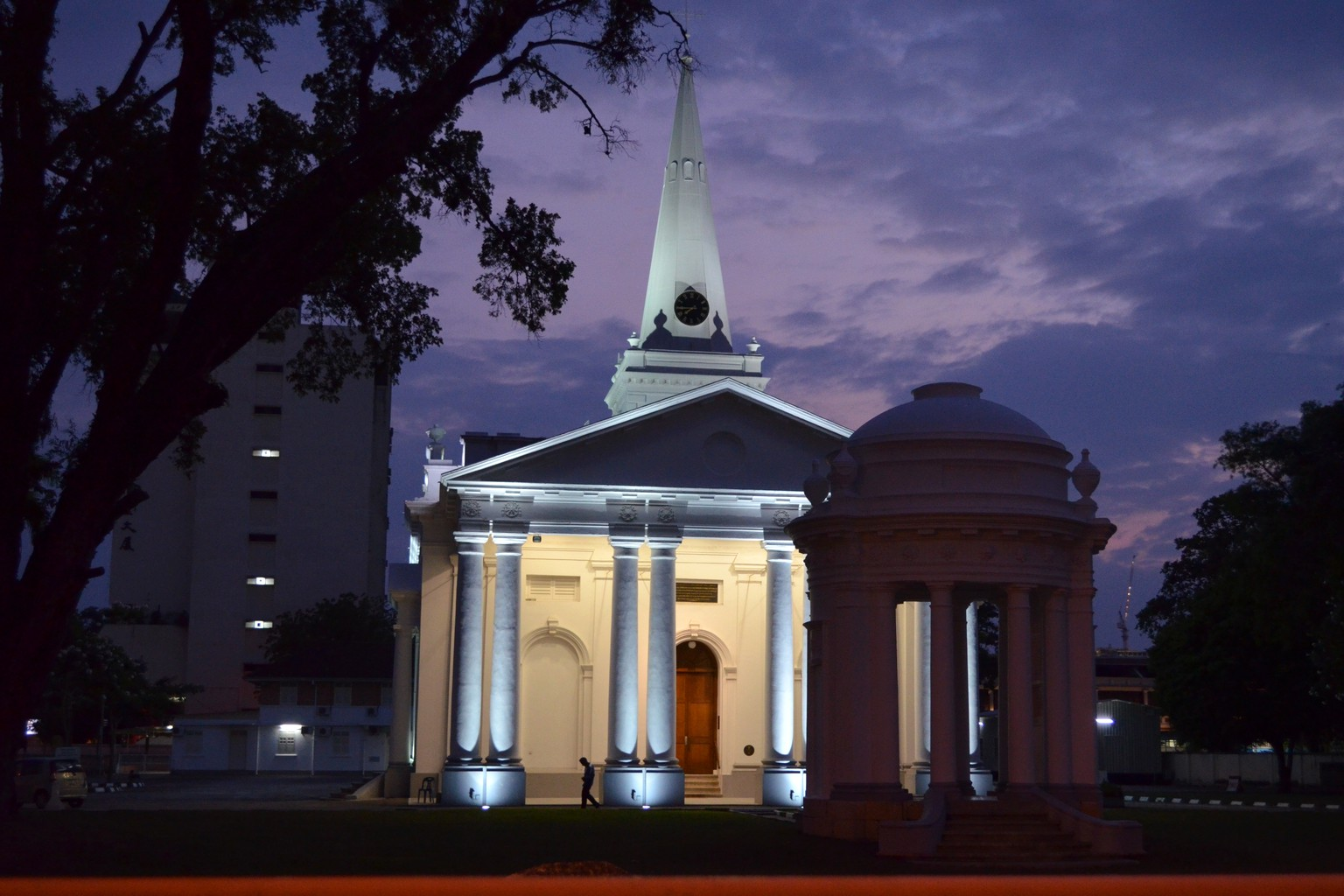
Clockwise from top left: Tanjong Bungah Floating Mosque, Kek Lok Si, St. George's Church and Arulmigu Karumariamman Temple

Islam is the official religion in Penang, prescribed by over 45% of the state's population in 2020. Penang is one of only two states where Islam is not in the majority, the other being Sarawak. Non-Muslims collectively formed almost 55% of Penang's population.

Buddhism is the second most proscribed religion in Penang, with nearly 37% of the population being adherents of either Theravada, Mahayana or Vajrayana sects. Notably, Theravada Buddhism is influenced by various countries of origin, with Thai, Burmese and Sinhalese temples established throughout George Town since the colonial era. Hindus made up the third largest religion in Penang, at over 8%, followed by the Christians at 4%. The first Eurasian settlers in George Town brought along Catholicism, while small numbers of missionaries from the London Missionary Society sought to evangelise the non-Christian population into Protestanism. Both sects also established some of George Town's oldest mission schools, including St Xavier's Institution, Convent Light Street and St. George's Girls' School.

The Penang state government maintains a policy of freedom of religion and religious assembly, and is also one of only three states in Malaysia to have a dedicated department for non-Muslim affairs. In 2021, the state government formed the Penang Harmony Corporation to further enhance interreligious harmony in the state. In particular, Pitt Street, within George Town's Central Business District (CBD), houses multiple places of worship belonging to Muslim, Taoist, Hindu and Christian communities, all located in close proximity to each other. This unique arrangement has earned Pitt Street the nickname "Street of Harmony".

== Languages ==
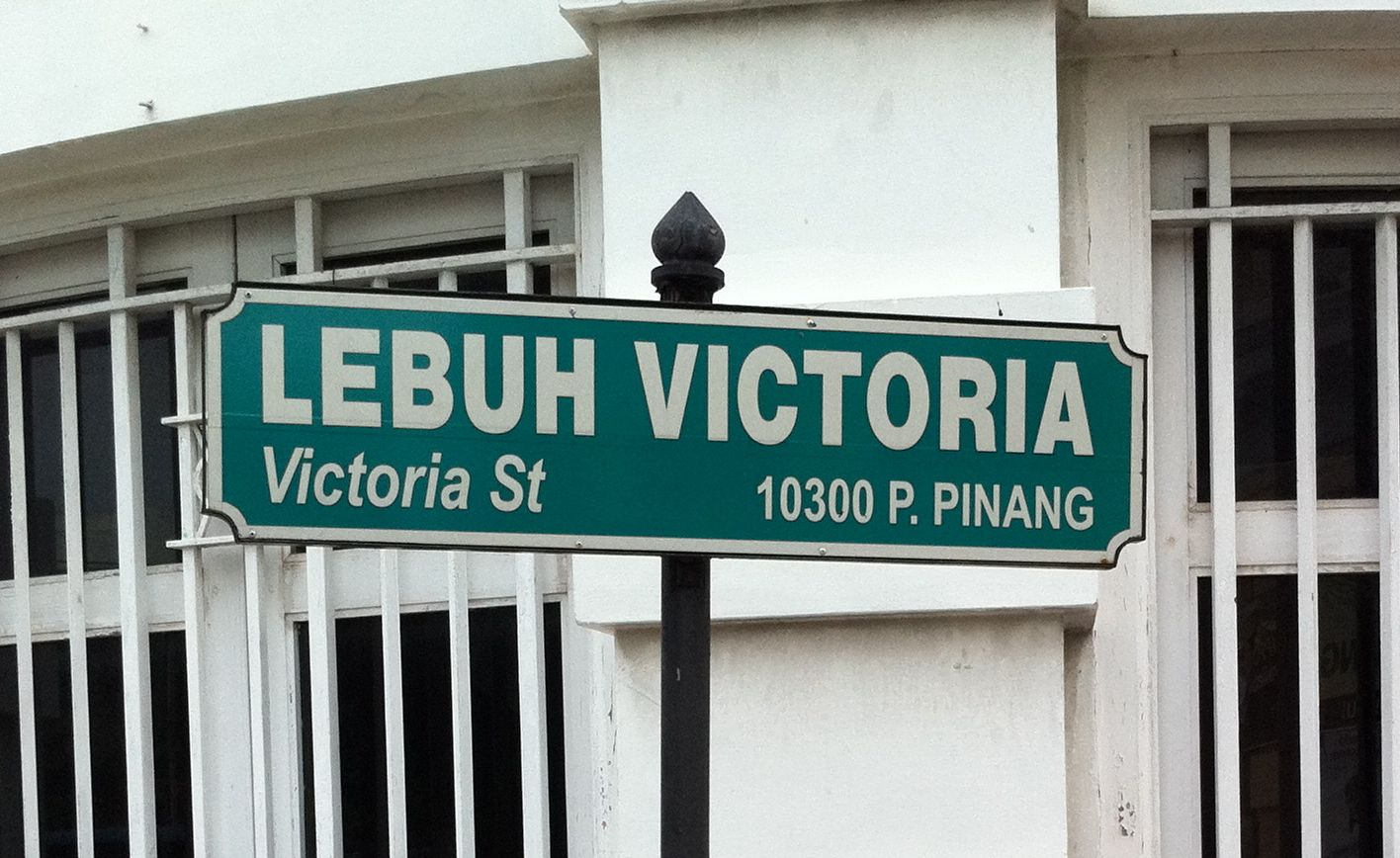
A bilingual street sign in George Town. Bilingual street signs that display either English, Chinese, Tamil or Arabic names have been installed throughout the city since 2008.

In Penang's diverse urban community, Malay, English, Hokkien, Mandarin, and Tamil are commonly used languages. Penang is particularly renowned for its unique Penang Hokkien dialect.

Like the rest of Malaysia, Malay is the official language in Penang. The Jawi Peranakans in the state also use a variant of the Kedah Malay dialect, slightly modified to suit the conditions of a cosmopolitan society.

English had been the official language in Penang during British rule. The growth of English and mission schools throughout George Town contributed significantly to the widespread use of the language in the state. The importance of English for global trade has also encouraged its adoption by the Chinese and Indian communities. In recent years, there have been calls to reinstate English as one of Penang's official languages.

Tamil is the most widely spoken language amongst ethnic Indians. In addition to Tamil, the other Indian languages used by minority Indians are Telugu and Punjabi, who hailed from diverse ancestries in the Indian subcontinent. On the other hand, Penang's Chinese population uses a variety of Chinese dialects, including Teochew, Hakka and Cantonese. Mandarin, which is more commonly used by youths for pragmatic reasons, has been the medium of instruction in Chinese schools throughout the state.

Penang Hokkien serves as the lingua franca between the various ethnicities in Penang. Originally a variant of the Southern Min group of languages, the dialect has absorbed numerous loanwords from Malay and English, yet another legacy of the Peranakan Chinese culture. Community efforts have been made to preserve the relevance of Penang Hokkien in the face of the rising prevalence of Mandarin and English among youths.

== Age distribution ==
As of 2020, Penang was the second “oldest” state in the country after Perak. 14.9% of Penang's population were aged 60 and older, and it was anticipated that the state will have the highest proportion of residents over 60s in Malaysia by 2040. The state and local governments have begun formulating age-friendly policies to support a rapidly ageing population, including more inclusive infrastructure, improving access to healthcare and encouraging active ageing.

Age distribution of residents in Seberang Perai in 2020
District	Subdivision	Population by age group (2020)						Overall dependency ratio	
District	Subdivision	0-14		15-64		65+		Overall dependency ratio	
District	Subdivision	2010	2020	2010	2020	2010	2020	2010	2020
North	Mukim 1	2,555	1,830	5,571	5,980	569	620	56.1	41.0
North	Mukim 2	1,979	1,548	4,120	4,328	512	588	60.5	49.4
North	Mukim 3	2,801	1,881	6,228	7,960	768	447	57.3	29.2
North	Mukim 4	4,084	3,098	7,038	9,677	607	591	66.7	38.1
North	Mukim 5	2,352	2,206	5,361	5,727	604	424	55.1	45.9
North	Mukim 6	12,079	13,774	23,187	37,416	1,399	1,879	58.1	41.8
North	Mukim 7	5,103	4,449	11,926	15,427	1,082	1,326	51.9	37.4
North	Mukim 8	4,227	3,867	10,877	13,062	916	1,106	47.3	38.1
North	Mukim 9	2,835	2,167	8,944	9,028	882	1,181	41.6	37.1
North	Mukim 10	1,261	1,093	2,818	3,245	412	408	59.4	46.3
North	Mukim 11	5,512	5,237	13,003	15,457	1,225	1,459	51.8	43.3
North	Mukim 12	7,893	7,574	16,495	21,669	1,647	1,917	57.8	43.8
North	Mukim 13	2,230	2,610	4,456	7,609	476	473	60.7	40.5
North	Mukim 14	3,967	3,434	14,481	16,448	1,158	2,056	35.4	33.4
North	Mukim 16	3,042	3,933	7,865	11,050	672	1,097	47.2	45.5
North	Butterworth	14,982	15,555	51,093	59,065	4,839	5,758	38.8	36.1
North	Kepala Batas	107	52	377	253	75	56	48.3	42.7
Central	Mukim 1	9,272	9,852	32,532	36,229	2,072	2,704	34.9	34.7
Central	Mukim 2	1,372	1,365	3,488	3,833	402	359	50.9	45.0
Central	Mukim 3	2,234	2,161	4,539	5,882	399	409	58.0	43.7
Central	Mukim 4	2,498	2,862	7,516	8,467	669	773	42.1	42.9
Central	Mukim 5	1,290	1,106	2,722	3,432	328	351	59.4	42.5
Central	Mukim 6	10,981	11,206	35,982	41,870	963	1,340	33.2	30.0
Central	Mukim 7	1,451	1,546	3,475	4,179	214	331	47.9	44.9
Central	Mukim 8	986	768	2,315	2,340	274	271	54.4	44.4
Central	Mukim 9	1,837	1,784	5,649	6,826	752	573	45.8	34.5
Central	Mukim 10	1,350	1,491	3,902	5,282	516	581	47.8	39.2
Central	Mukim 11	5,315	6,244	25,512	28,972	1,687	2,488	27.4	30.1
Central	Mukim 12	1,888	2,064	4,807	7,165	453	652	48.7	37.9
Central	Mukim 13	4,748	4,441	13,828	19,458	635	1,083	38.9	28.4
Central	Mukim 14	8,324	9,507	23,559	34,274	2,158	2,499	44.5	35.0
Central	Mukim 15	13,864	12,427	41,719	51,202	2,973	4,468	40.4	33.0
Central	Mukim 16	3,721	3,989	9,208	12,403	935	920	50.6	39.6
Central	Mukim 17	607	801	2,246	2,513	262	245	38.7	41.6
Central	Mukim 18	577	746	2,779	1,677	246	182	29.6	55.3
Central	Mukim 19	982	1,611	2,407	3,881	256	310	51.4	49.5
Central	Mukim 20	3,464	3,291	9,109	9,649	759	995	46.4	44.4
Central	Mukim 21	1,298	1,176	2,731	2,892	253	363	56.8	53.2
Central	Bukit Mertajam	2,309	2,352	9,331	8,304	1,457	1,423	40.4	45.5
Central	Perai	3,219	3,043	10,580	12,283	634	824	36.4	31.5
South	Mukim 1	900	507	1,994	1,782	216	116	56.0	35.0
South	Mukim 2	674	298	1,258	1,168	110	44	62.3	29.3
South	Mukim 3	562	335	1,367	1,282	79	113	46.9	34.9
South	Mukim 4	2,671	2,033	6,157	7,347	468	504	51.0	34.5
South	Mukim 5	2,960	1,990	5,351	6,439	386	282	62.5	35.3
South	Mukim 6	1,041	2,391	2,036	5,183	51	105	53.6	48.2
South	Mukim 7	4,889	3,863	13,326	15,535	818	704	42.8	29.4
South	Mukim 8	591	612	1,919	1,609	215	161	42.0	48.0
South	Mukim 9	6,096	3,851	13,326	13,799	855	1,152	52.2	36.3
South	Mukim 10	2,914	1,734	6,031	6,676	744	623	60.7	35.3
South	Mukim 11	5,898	4,053	15,296	14,295	1,571	1,238	48.8	37.0
South	Mukim 12	520	585	1,484	9,526	297	179	55.1	8.0
South	Mukim 13	2,083	3,055	3,303	8,135	151	219	67.6	40.2
South	Mukim 14	6,682	4,964	16,930	17,044	966	982	45.2	34.9
South	Mukim 15	8,348	7,796	19,134	26,401	1,183	1,441	49.8	35.0
South	Mukim 16	109	34	263	129	19	28	48.7	48.1
South	Nibong Tebal	392	219	1,408	1,046	245	160	45.2	36.2
South	Sungai Bakap	76	47	265	183	57	10	50.2	31.1

Age distribution of residents in George Town in 2020
District	Subdivision	Population by age group						Overall dependency ratio	
District	Subdivision	0-14		15-64		65+		Overall dependency ratio	
District	Subdivision	2010	2020	2010	2020	2010	2020	2010	2020
Northeast	Paya Terubong	40,076	40,879	151,915	170,748	11,482	15,085	33.9	32.8
Northeast	Bukit Paya Terubong	291	208	1,197	1,547	211	243	41.9	29.2
Northeast	Mukim 15	0	0	4	13	0	0	0	0
Northeast	Mukim 16	237	234	1,139	982	184	192	37.0	43.4
Northeast	Mukim 17	922	342	2,499	1,930	157	307	43.2	33.6
Northeast	Mukim 18	2,194	2,912	9,387	13,764	1,219	1,541	36.4	32.4
Northeast	Ayer Itam	2,503	2,925	11,845	11,145	2,934	2,904	45.9	52.3
Northeast	Batu Ferringhi	3,767	1,567	8,674	6,637	1,045	842	55.5	36.3
Northeast	Penang Hill	34	51	100	253	39	28	73.0	31.2
Northeast	Gelugor	1,970	2,549	9,583	15,128	1,309	985	34.2	23.4
Northeast	City centre	24,254	27,778	105,542	115,337	15,586	15,221	37.7	37.3
Northeast	Jelutong	13,158	13,472	47,899	43,965	5,161	6,070	38.2	44.4
Northeast	Tanjong Bungah	2,508	1,831	11,038	10,446	1,598	1,994	37.2	36.6
Northeast	Tanjong Tokong	2,594	2,580	9,784	8,605	1,540	1,365	42.3	45.8
Northeast	Tanjong Pinang	786	2,517	2,474	8,801	157	652	38.1	36.0
Southwest	Pantai Acheh	1,344	888	3,414	3,008	340	406	49.3	43.0
Southwest	Teluk Bahang	692	584	1,758	1,756	174	191	49.3	44.1
Southwest	Bukit Sungai Pinang	147	452	444	1,300	44	167	43.0	47.6
Southwest	Batu Hitam	732	848	2,045	2,461	249	265	48.0	45.2
Southwest	Bukit Balik Pulau	30	288	127	916	23	78	41.7	40.0
Southwest	Pondok Upih	2,095	1,632	5,030	5,508	522	539	52.0	39.4
Southwest	Bukit Genting	387	393	950	953	125	163	53.9	58.3
Southwest	Bukit Pasir Panjang	272	425	824	945	89	74	43.8	52.8
Southwest	Bukit Gemuruh	4,518	5,026	9,834	11,679	573	674	51.8	48.8
Southwest	Bukit Relau	789	4,232	1,680	13,872	204	651	59.1	35.2
Southwest	Teluk Kumbar	4,731	4,849	10,743	15,808	584	824	49.5	35.9
Southwest	Bayan Lepas	28,698	25,329	87,786	96,641	5,823	8,485	39.3	35.0
Southwest	Sungai Pinang	443	500	1,099	1,604	154	219	54.3	44.8
Southwest	Sungai Rusa	531	615	1,036	2,025	91	177	60.0	39.1
Southwest	Permatang Pasir	771	705	1,545	1,588	171	146	61.0	53.6
Southwest	Bagan Air Hitam	463	793	1,313	2,309	181	280	49.0	46.5
Southwest	Titi Teras	519	599	1,299	1,667	180	128	53.8	43.6
Southwest	Kongsi	687	728	1,905	1,834	253	168	49.3	48.9
Southwest	Kampung Paya	893	1,128	1,863	2,738	106	115	53.6	45.4
Southwest	Sungai Burung	275	426	764	1,013	89	84	47.6	50.3
Southwest	Pulau Betong	343	382	879	1,087	111	82	51.6	42.7
Southwest	Dataran Genting	273	585	699	1,467	130	127	57.7	48.5
Southwest	Balik Pulau	46	24	161	77	38	8	52.2	41.6

== Gender composition ==
Gender composition in Seberang Perai in 2020
District	Subdivision	Population		Sex ratio
District	Subdivision	Male	Female	Sex ratio
North	Mukim 1	4,280	4,150	103
North	Mukim 2	3,270	3,194	102
North	Mukim 3	5,210	5,078	103
North	Mukim 4	6,881	6,485	106
North	Mukim 5	4,259	4,098	104
North	Mukim 6	27,341	25,728	106
North	Mukim 7	10,694	10,508	102
North	Mukim 8	9,610	8,425	114
North	Mukim 9	6,367	6,009	106
North	Mukim 10	2,312	2,434	95
North	Mukim 11	11,227	10,926	103
North	Mukim 12	15,959	15,201	105
North	Mukim 13	5,675	5,017	113
North	Mukim 14	11,141	10,797	103
North	Mukim 16	8,129	7,951	102
North	Butterworth	39,924	40,454	99
North	Kepala Batas	169	192	88
Central	Mukim 1	26,122	22,663	115
Central	Mukim 2	2,819	2,738	103
Central	Mukim 3	4,348	4,104	106
Central	Mukim 4	6,182	5,920	104
Central	Mukim 5	2,414	2,475	98
Central	Mukim 6	29,989	24,427	123
Central	Mukim 7	3,090	2,966	104
Central	Mukim 8	1,656	1,723	96
Central	Mukim 9	4,632	4,551	102
Central	Mukim 10	3,680	3,674	100
Central	Mukim 11	19,210	18,494	104
Central	Mukim 12	5,213	4,668	112
Central	Mukim 13	14,364	10,618	135
Central	Mukim 14	24,829	21,451	116
Central	Mukim 15	36,847	31,250	118
Central	Mukim 16	9,190	8,122	113
Central	Mukim 17	1,815	1,744	104
Central	Mukim 18	1,327	1,278	104
Central	Mukim 19	2,860	2,942	97
Central	Mukim 20	7,006	6,929	101
Central	Mukim 21	2,220	2,211	100
Central	Bukit Mertajam	5,994	6,085	99
Central	Perai	8,899	7,251	123
South	Mukim 1	1,227	1,178	104
South	Mukim 2	765	745	103
South	Mukim 3	872	858	102
South	Mukim 4	5,231	4,653	112
South	Mukim 5	4,500	4,211	107
South	Mukim 6	3,994	3,685	108
South	Mukim 7	11,266	8,836	128
South	Mukim 8	1,273	1,109	115
South	Mukim 9	9,701	9,101	107
South	Mukim 10	4,587	4,446	103
South	Mukim 11	10,246	9,340	110
South	Mukim 12	1,589	8,701	18
South	Mukim 13	6,033	5,376	112
South	Mukim 14	12,199	10,791	113
South	Mukim 15	18,336	17,302	106
South	Mukim 16	91	100	91
South	Nibong Tebal	724	701	103
South	Sungai Bakap	131	109	120

Gender composition in George Town in 2020
District	Subdivision	Population		Sex ratio
District	Subdivision	Male	Female	Sex ratio
Northeast	Paya Terubong	114,008	112,704	101
Northeast	Bukit Paya Terubong	1,008	990	102
Northeast	Mukim 15	13	-	-
Northeast	Mukim 16	688	720	96
Northeast	Mukim 17	1,281	1,298	99
Northeast	Mukim 18	8,994	9,223	98
Northeast	Ayer Itam	8,396	8,578	98
Northeast	Batu Ferringhi	4,559	4,487	102
Northeast	Penang Hill	189	143	132
Northeast	Gelugor	9,231	9,431	98
Northeast	City centre	82,757	75,579	109
Northeast	Jelutong	31,700	31,807	100
Northeast	Tanjong Bungah	7,271	7,000	104
Northeast	Tanjong Tokong	6,383	6,167	104
Northeast	Tanjong Pinang	5,954	6,016	99
Southwest	Pantai Acheh	2,232	2,070	108
Southwest	Teluk Bahang	1,281	1,250	102
Southwest	Bukit Sungai Pinang	998	921	108
Southwest	Batu Hitam	1,840	1,734	106
Southwest	Bukit Balik Pulau	677	605	112
Southwest	Pondok Upih	3,912	3,767	104
Southwest	Bukit Genting	831	678	123
Southwest	Bukit Pasir Panjang	741	703	105
Southwest	Bukit Gemuruh	9,085	8,294	110
Southwest	Bukit Relau	9,651	9,104	106
Southwest	Teluk Kumbar	10,683	10,798	99
Southwest	Bayan Lepas	65,389	65,066	100
Southwest	Sungai Pinang	1,187	1,136	104
Southwest	Sungai Rusa	1,411	1,406	100
Southwest	Permatang Pasir	1,233	1,206	102
Southwest	Bagan Air Hitam	1,701	1,681	101
Southwest	Titi Teras	1,142	1,252	91
Southwest	Kongsi	1,395	1,335	104
Southwest	Kampung Paya	2,141	1,840	116
Southwest	Sungai Burung	737	786	94
Southwest	Pulau Betong	774	777	100
Southwest	Dataran Genting	1,111	1,068	104
Southwest	Balik Pulau	51	58	107

== Fertility and mortality ==
Fertility and mortality in Seberang Perai by constituencies
State constituency	Live births per 1,000 people	Death rate per 1,000 people
Penaga	23.6	6.4
Bertam	23.8	6.0
Pinang Tunggal	23.3	6.2
Permatang Berangan	23.8	6.3
Sungai Dua	23.6	6.4
Telok Ayer Tawar	23.2	6.2
Sungai Puyu	22.8	6.1
Bagan Jermal	21.1	6.0
Bagan Dalam	23.4	6.2
Seberang Jaya	23.2	6.0
Permatang Pasir	23.5	6.4
Penanti	23.2	6.3
Berapit	23.6	5.9
Machang Bubuk	24.1	6.2
Padang Lalang	23.6	6.4
Perai	25.6	6.2
Bukit Tengah	24.5	5.8
Bukit Tambun	19.2	5.6
Jawi	24.6	6.4
Sungai Bakap	24.4	6.3
Sungai Acheh	22.9	6.0
State average	23.1	6.1

Fertility and mortality in George Town by constituencies
State constituency	Live births per 1,000 people	Death rate per 1,000 people
Tanjong Bunga	23.2	6.3
Air Putih	235.5	28.9
Kebun Bunga	22.9	6.4
Pulau Tikus	20.3	5.6
Padang Kota	23.2	4.7
Pengkalan Kota	22.2	5.2
Komtar	21.7	4.2
Datok Keramat	23.0	6.2
Sungai Pinang	22.9	6.4
Batu Lancang	23.6	6.4
Seri Delima	23.2	6.2
Air Itam	22.4	6.0
Paya Terubong	22.3	6.0
Batu Uban	21.8	6.2
Pantai Jerejak	25.5	6.3
Batu Maung	22.9	6.4
Bayan Lepas	24.0	6.4
Pulau Betong	24.5	6.5
Telok Bahang	23.9	6.4
State average	23.1	6.1

== See also ==
- Demographics of Malaysia
