= Indigenous peoples of Malaysia =

For information on the indigenous peoples of Malaysia, please see:

- Orang Asal, a general term for Indigenous peoples
- Orang Asli, a general term for Indigenous peoples from Peninsular Malaysia
