= Bukit Mertajam =

Suburb of Seberang Perai, Malaysia

- Suburb of Seberang Perai and district capital
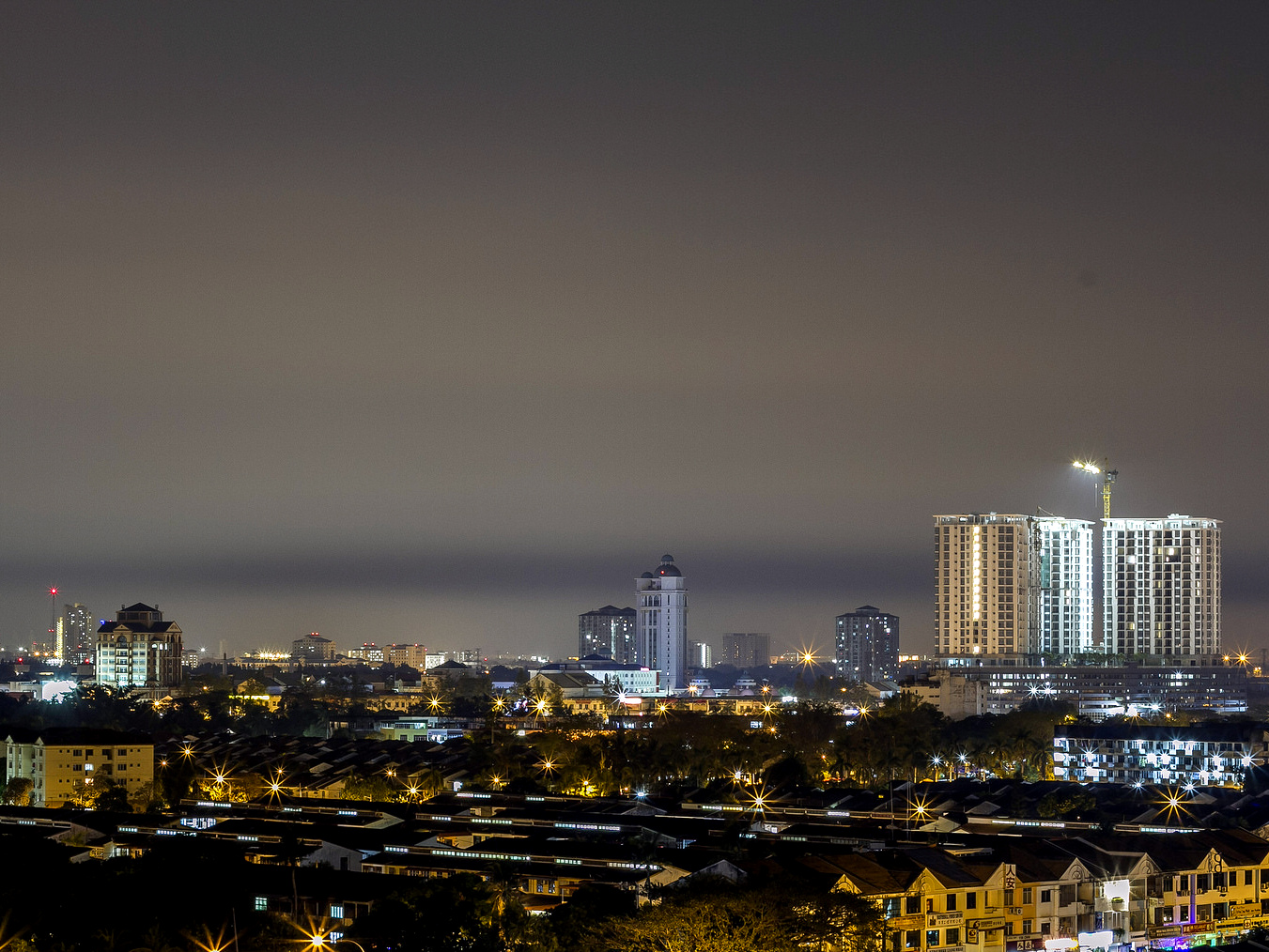
- Interactive map of Bukit Mertajam
- Location within Seberang Perai in Penang
- Coordinates: 5°21′55.692″N 100°27′38.3898″E
- Country: Malaysia
- State: Penang
- City: Seberang Perai
- District: Central Seberang Perai

Area
  - Total: 6 km^{2} (2.3 sq mi)

Population (2020)
  - Total: 19,433
  - Density: 3,200/km^{2} (8,400/sq mi)

Demographics
  - Ethnic groups: 66.5% Chinese; 21.5% Bumiputera; 21.2% Malay; 0.3% indigenous groups from Sabah and Sarawak; 9.5% Indian; 0.5% Other ethnicities; 2.0% Non-citizens
- Time zone: UTC+8 (MST)
  - Summer (DST): Not observed
- Postal code: 14000

Bukit Mertajam is a suburb of Seberang Perai in the Malaysian state of Penang. It also serves as the seat of the Central Seberang Perai District. As of 2020, Bukit Mertajam had a population of 19,433.

Whilst founded in the 19th century as an agricultural area, Bukit Mertajam also evolved into a transportation hub, following the completion of a railway line towards Perai at the end of the century. To this day, its railway station remains a major Malayan Railway station within Seberang Perai.

Bukit Mertajam is also well known for its Catholic congregation, which is centred at the St. Anne's Church. The church is one of the focal locations within Southeast Asia for the annual Novena celebrations.

It is the birthplace of the 10th Prime Minister of Malaysia Anwar Ibrahim.

== Etymology ==
Bukit Mertajam derived its name from a hill named Mertajam which means "pointed" in Malay. This was said to be a native reference to the geography of the area, where the hill forms the highest outcrop.

== History ==
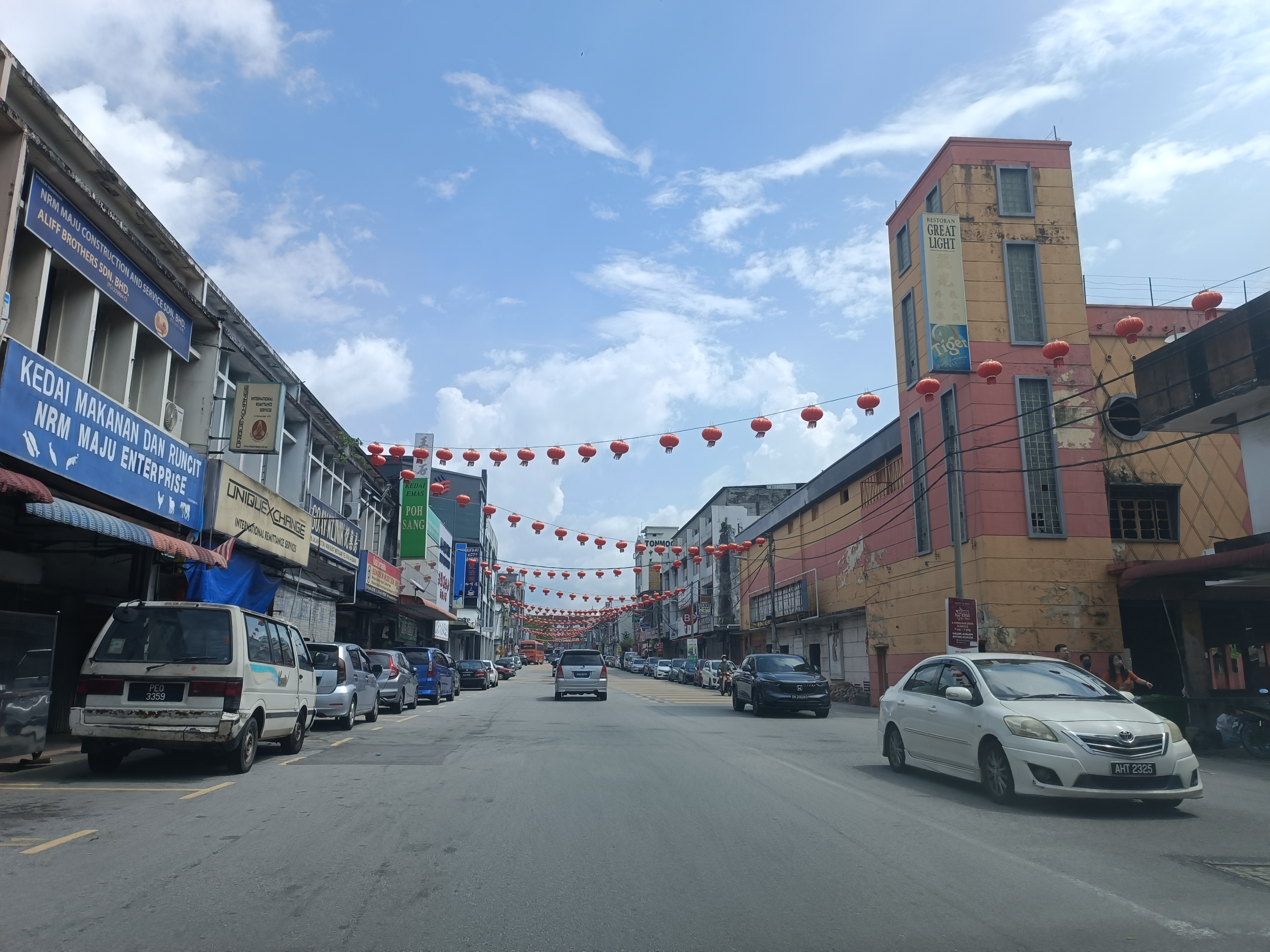
Jalan Aston within the heart of Bukit Mertajam

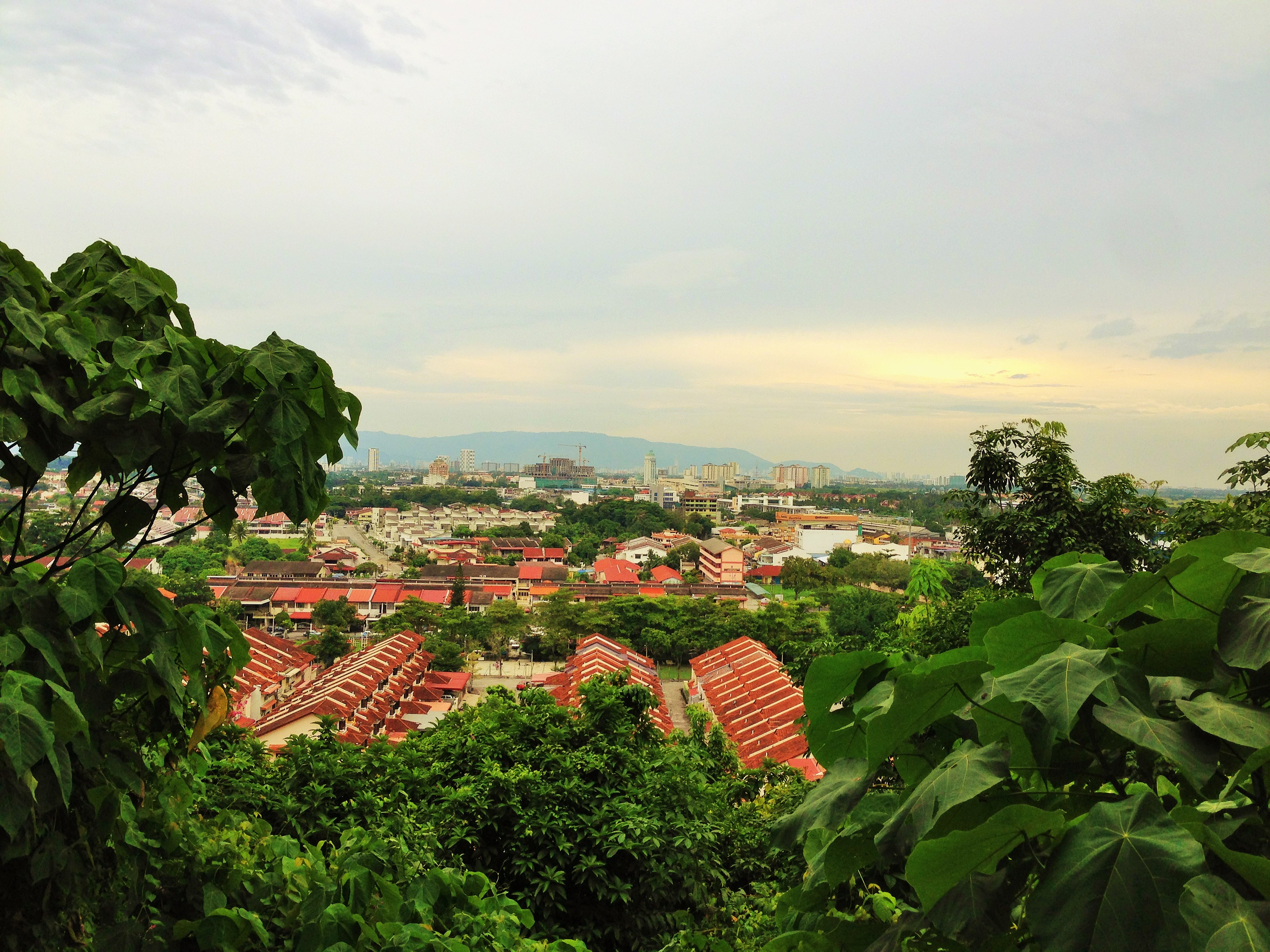
A residential estate in Bukit Mertajam

Bukit Mertajam had been part of the Hindu-Buddhist Bujang Valley civilisation, which ruled over what is now Kedah up to the 6th century AD. A megalith at Cherok Tok Kun, discovered in 1845, contains Pali inscriptions which alluded to the presence of a Hindu-Buddhist polity in the region between the 5th and 6th centuries.

Bukit Mertajam only came into existence in the 19th century, after the acquisition of the area by the British East India Company in 1800. Prior to the British acquisition, the area had been inhabited by Malay and Siamese farmers. As the British encouraged the cultivation of spices throughout the newly acquired territory of Province Wellesley (now Seberang Perai), Chinese settlers, mostly of Hakka origin, moved into Bukit Mertajam. The Chinese migrants opened up spice plantations at the foot of Mertajam Hill and were also involved in granite production. Sugar plantations were established to the south of the area in the mid-19th century.

These economic activities led to the construction of roads throughout Province Wellesley. With many of these roads converging in Bukit Mertajam, the area soon became a transit point for the movement of agricultural produce towards the Port of Penang. Bukit Mertajam's role as a transportation hub was cemented with the completion of a railway line between Bukit Mertajam and the coastal port area of Perai in 1899, allowing for a rapid transportation of commodities such as rubber and tin towards the harbour. Concurrently, public amenities, such as schools, a magistrate's court and a hospital, were built, and by the turn of the century, Bukit Mertajam was selected by the Straits Settlements authorities as the administrative centre of the Central Province Wellesley District.

The Bukit Mertajam Town Council was established in 1953. At the time, it was one of the five local governments within Province Wellesley. The local governments were eventually amalgamated and transformed into the Seberang Perai Municipal Council by 1976. In 2006, the headquarters of the municipal council was relocated from Butterworth to the Bandar Perda township near Bukit Mertajam, making the latter the seat of the local government of Seberang Perai as well.

Beginning in the 1970s, residential estates were also developed in the areas surrounding Bukit Mertajam, fuelled by the industrialisation of certain areas near the area, such as Bukit Minyak and Bukit Tengah.

== Geography ==
Bukit Mertajam is situated close to Mertajam Hill, which is surrounded by flat alluvial plains. The suburb spans an area of 4 km^{2} (1.5 sq mi), and lies between Permatang Pauh to the north, Kedah to the east, Bukit Minyak to the south and Bukit Tengah to the west.

Map of Bukit Mertajam.
Click link at the top right corner to zoom in.
1 Bukit Mertajam Market
2 Hospital
3 The Summit Plaza
4 St. Anne's Church
5 DO Hill

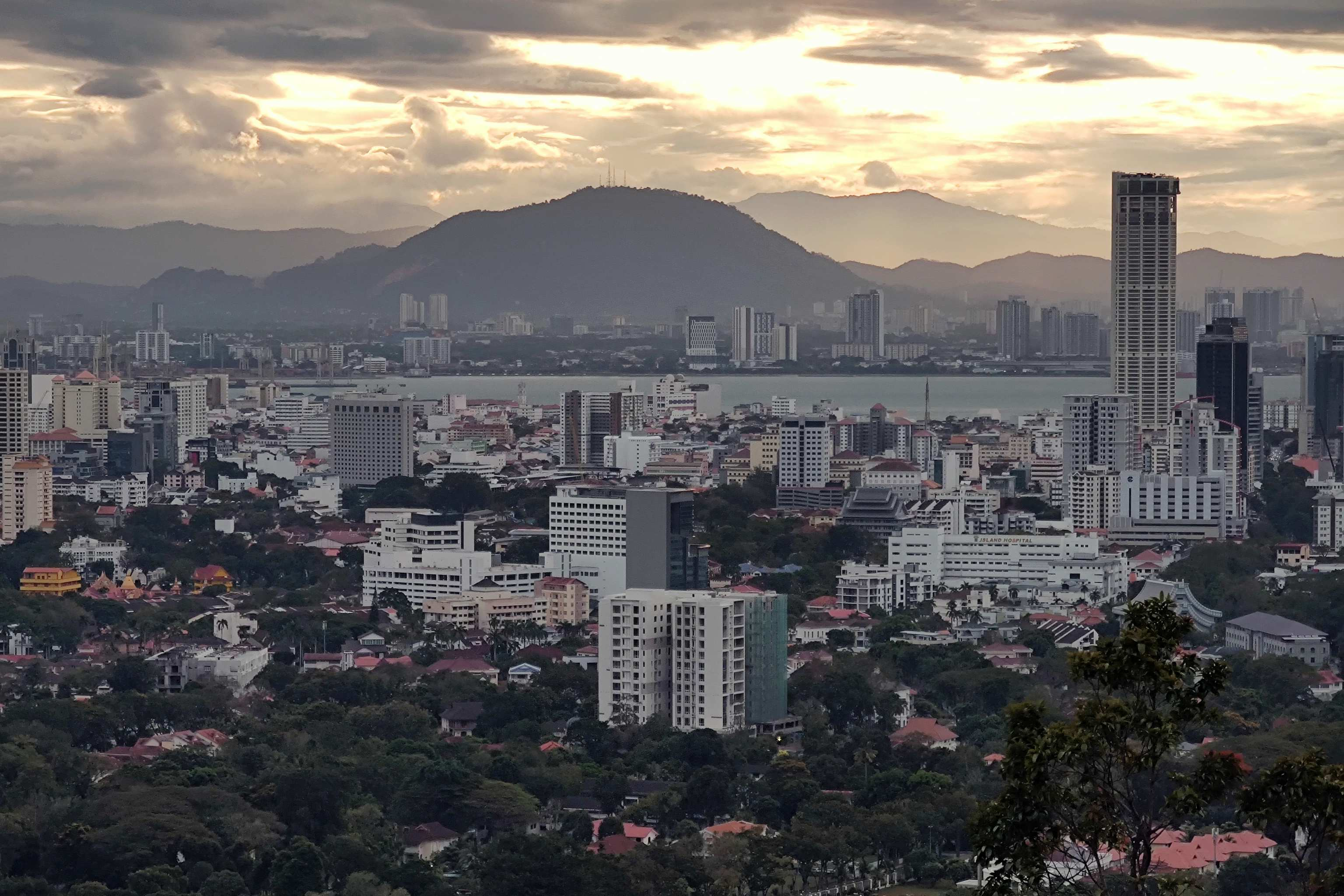
545-metre (1,788 ft) Mertajam Hill viewed from Penang Island at sunset

== Governance ==
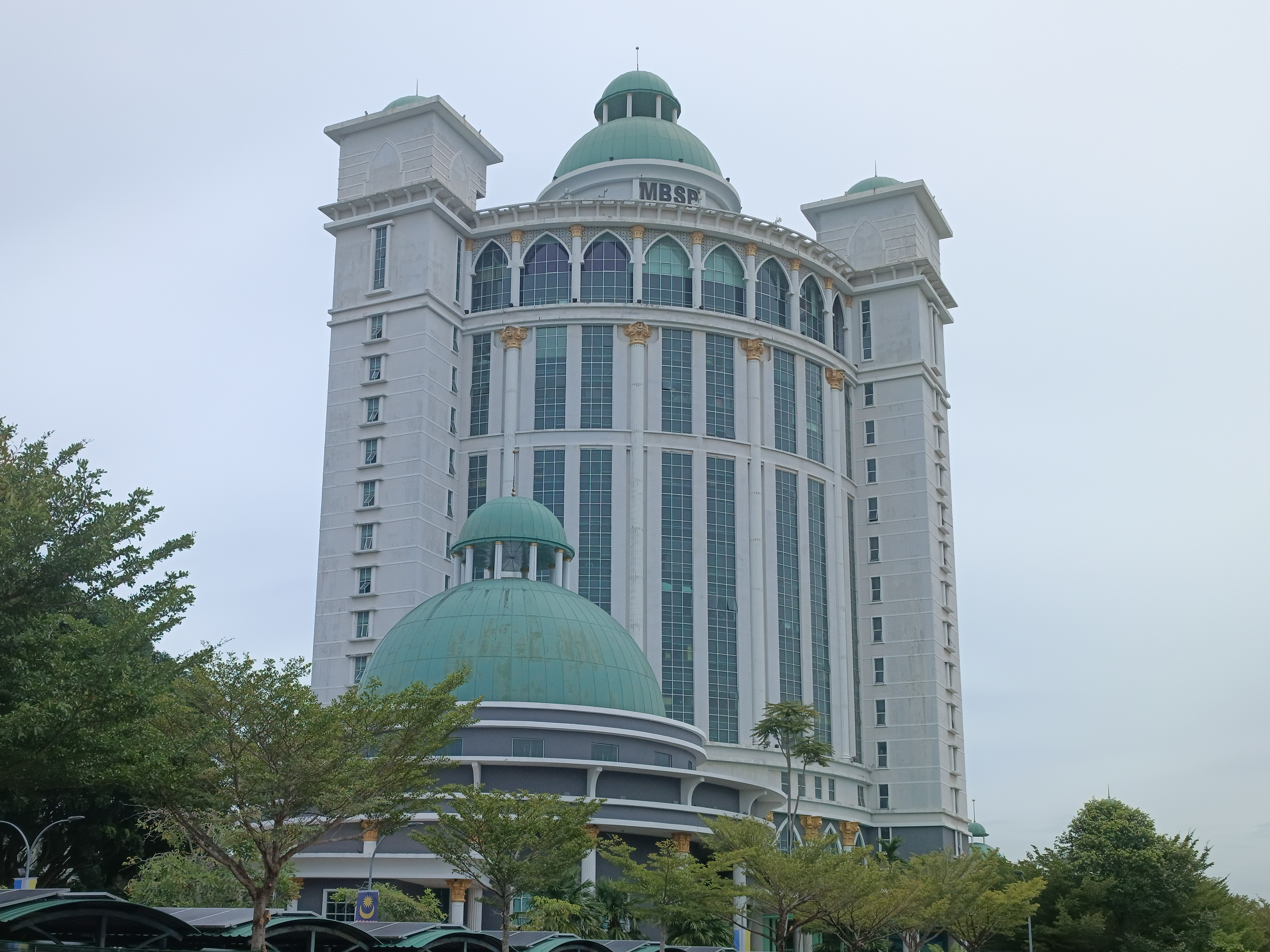
The headquarters of the Seberang Perai City Council at Bandar Perda

The Bandar Perda township houses the administrative centre of the local government of Seberang Perai, the mainland half of the State of Penang. The MBSP building, completed in 2006, is the headquarters of the Seberang Perai City Council.

In addition, the District and Land Office of the Central Seberang Perai District is situated at Jalan Betek. As the seat of the district, Bukit Mertajam contains the district's Magistrates Court as well.

== Demographics ==
Ethnicities within Bukit Mertajam in 2020
Ethnicities / Nationality	Percentage
Chinese	67.8%
Malays	21.0%
Other Bumiputeras	0.3%
Indians	8.1%
Others	0.6%
Non-Malaysians	2.2%

As of 2020, Bukit Mertajam was home to a population of 12,079. Ethnic Chinese comprised close to 68% of the population, followed by Malays at 21% and Indians at 8%.

== Transportation ==
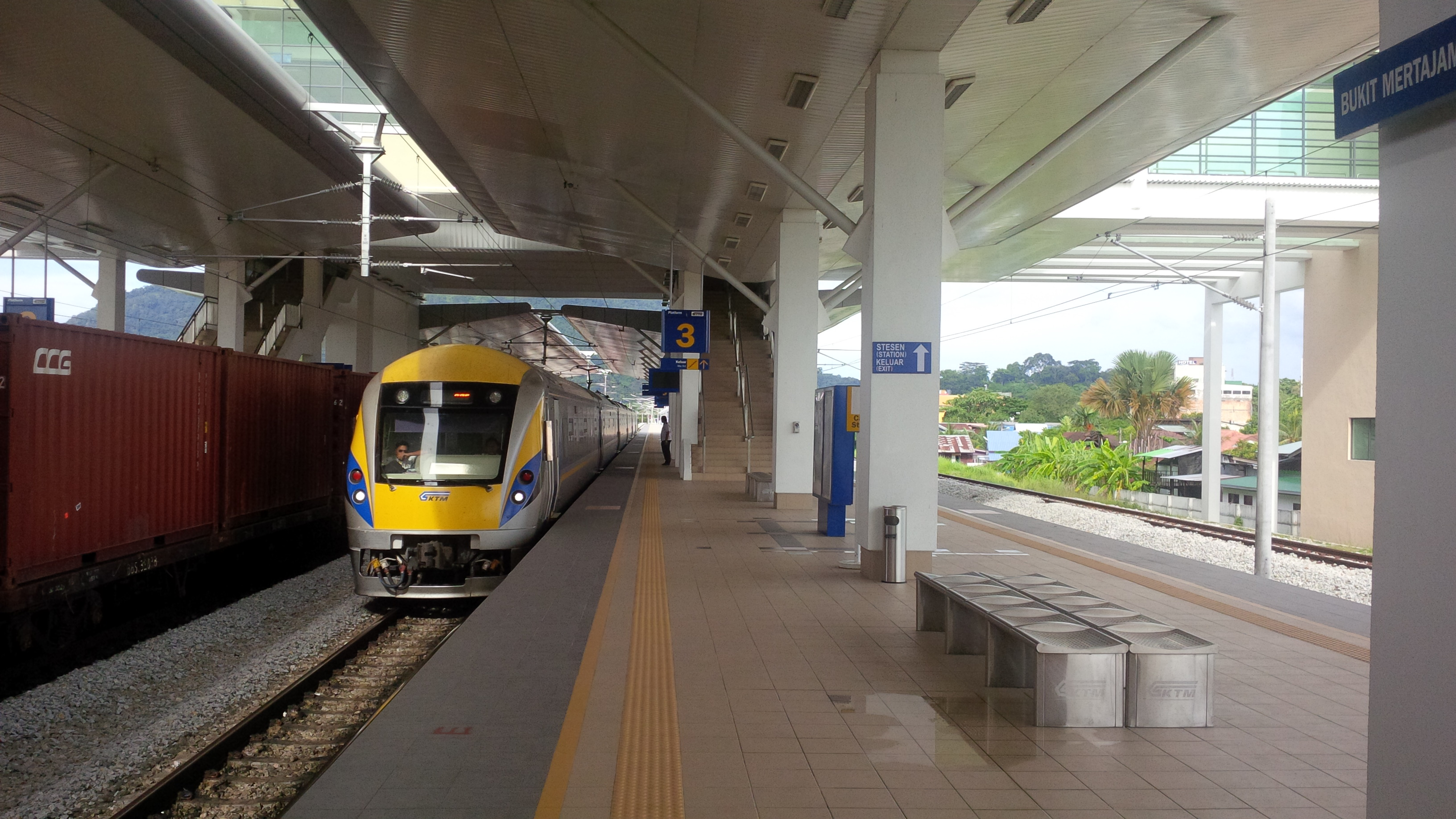
The Malayan Railway's Electric Train Service (ETS) at the Bukit Mertajam railway station

The main thoroughfares within Bukit Mertajam include Jalan Pasar and Jalan Kulim. In addition, both the North–South Expressway and Federal Route 1 pass by Bukit Mertajam, linking the area with the rest of Peninsular Malaysia.

Similar in function to the aforementioned pan-Peninsular expressway, the Bukit Mertajam railway station provides intercity rail transportation towards other major cities and towns along western Peninsular Malaysia, as well as on to Woodlands in Singapore.

Rapid Penang's routes 606, 701, 702, T713, 709 and 802 serve the residents of Bukit Mertajam, connecting the area with other parts of Seberang Perai, such as Butterworth, Perai, Juru, Simpang Ampat and Nibong Tebal. These routes are complemented by Rapid Penang's Congestion Alleviation Transport (CAT), a free-of-charge transit service within Bukit Mertajam. Cityliner also operates an additional bus route between Bukit Mertajam and Butterworth.

== Education ==
Bukit Mertajam contains a total of 14 primary schools and eight high schools.

Primary schools

- Convent Bukit Mertajam Primary School
- SRK Bandar Baru Perda
- SRK Stowell
- SRK Kampung Baru
- SRK Kebun Sireh
- SRK Juara
- SRK Sungai Rambai
- SRJK (C) Jit Sin A
- SRJK (C) Jit Sin B
- SRJK (C) Keow Kuang
- SRJK (C) Kim Sen
- SRJK (C) Perkampungan Berapit
- SRJK (C) Beng Teik (Pusat)
- SRJK (T) Bukit Mertajam

High schools

- Bukit Mertajam High School
- Convent Bukit Mertajam
- SMK Bandar Baru Perda
- SMK Berapit
- SMK Jalan Damai
- SMK Permatang Rawa
- Jit Sin High School
- Jit Sin Independent High School

In addition to these schools, the Penang State Library also operates a branch in Bukit Mertajam.

== Health care ==
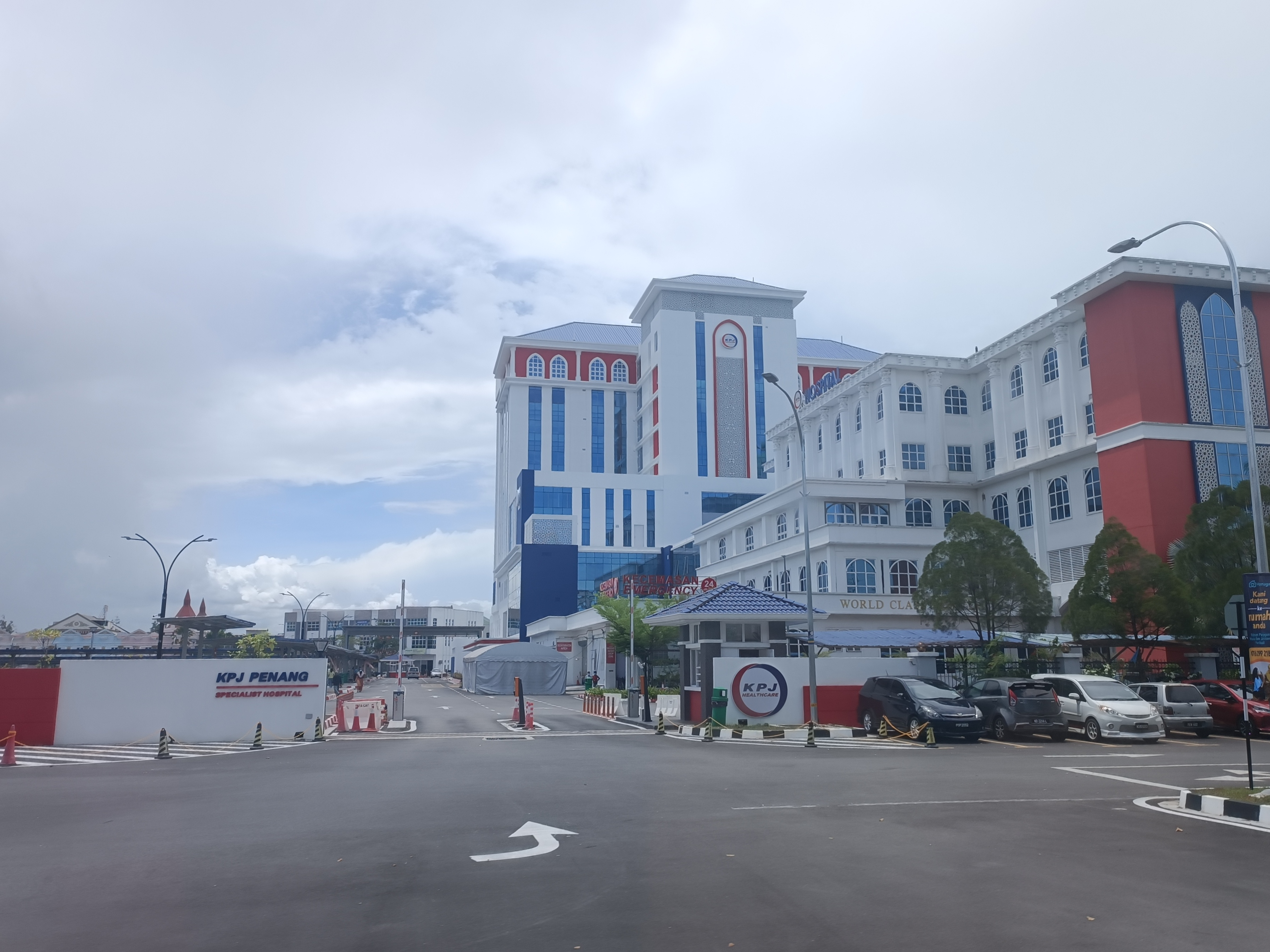
KPJ Penang Specialist Hospital

The Bukit Mertajam Hospital, run by Malaysia's Ministry of Health, is one of the six public hospitals scattered throughout the State of Penang. Completed in 1890, it is currently a non-specialist hospital with a capacity of 242 beds. It offers a limited range of treatments, including gynaecology, paediatrics and psychiatry.

Bukit Mertajam also contains a private hospital, namely the KPJ Penang Specialist Hospital. The 236-bed hospital, owned by Johor Corporation, offers various specialist treatments, such as gastroenterology, physiotherapy, lithotripsy and haemodialysis.

== Retail ==
The Summit Bukit Mertajam Plaza is the shopping mall within Bukit Mertajam proper. Launched in 1997 and situated at Jalan Arumugam Pillai, it consists of a four-storey retail block and a high-rise currently occupied by The Summit Hotel. On June 4, 2014, AEON Bukit Mertajam (formerly known as JUSCO supermarkets) is open in Alma area to attract more customers from Bukit Mertajam and Kulim. AEON Bukit Mertajam Shopping Center is the largest modern integrated shopping complex in Alma. The mall has total six levels, its consist of grocery area, cinema, franchise food restaurants, overseas fashion outlet such as Uniqlo, Cotton on, Brands Outlet, Skechers and so on. The mall also has a cyber library operated by the Penang Library.

== Tourist attractions ==
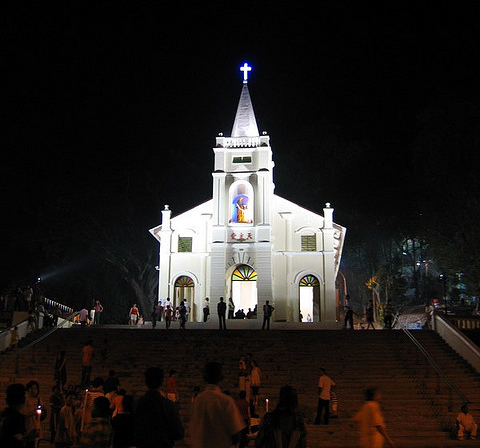
St. Anne's Church is the focal point of the annual Novena festivities within Southeast Asia.

Built in 1888, St. Anne's Church is one of the most recognisable landmarks in Bukit Mertajam. It is one of the parishes of the Roman Catholic Diocese of Penang. Every year, the church hosts one of the largest Novena festivals in Southeast Asia, attracting about 100,000 visitors.

The area has a number of tourist destinations, including the Bukit Mertajam Market and the nearby Hock Teik Cheng Shin Temple. The latter is a Taoist temple, which was constructed in 1886. At the time, the temple owned much of the land within the town centre and was responsible for the development of the Bukit Mertajam Market. The two-storey market, built in the late 19th century, was last renovated in 1934 by the British authorities.

== See also ==
- Bukit Minyak
- Bukit Tengah
