= Sungai Bakap =

- Suburb of Seberang Perai
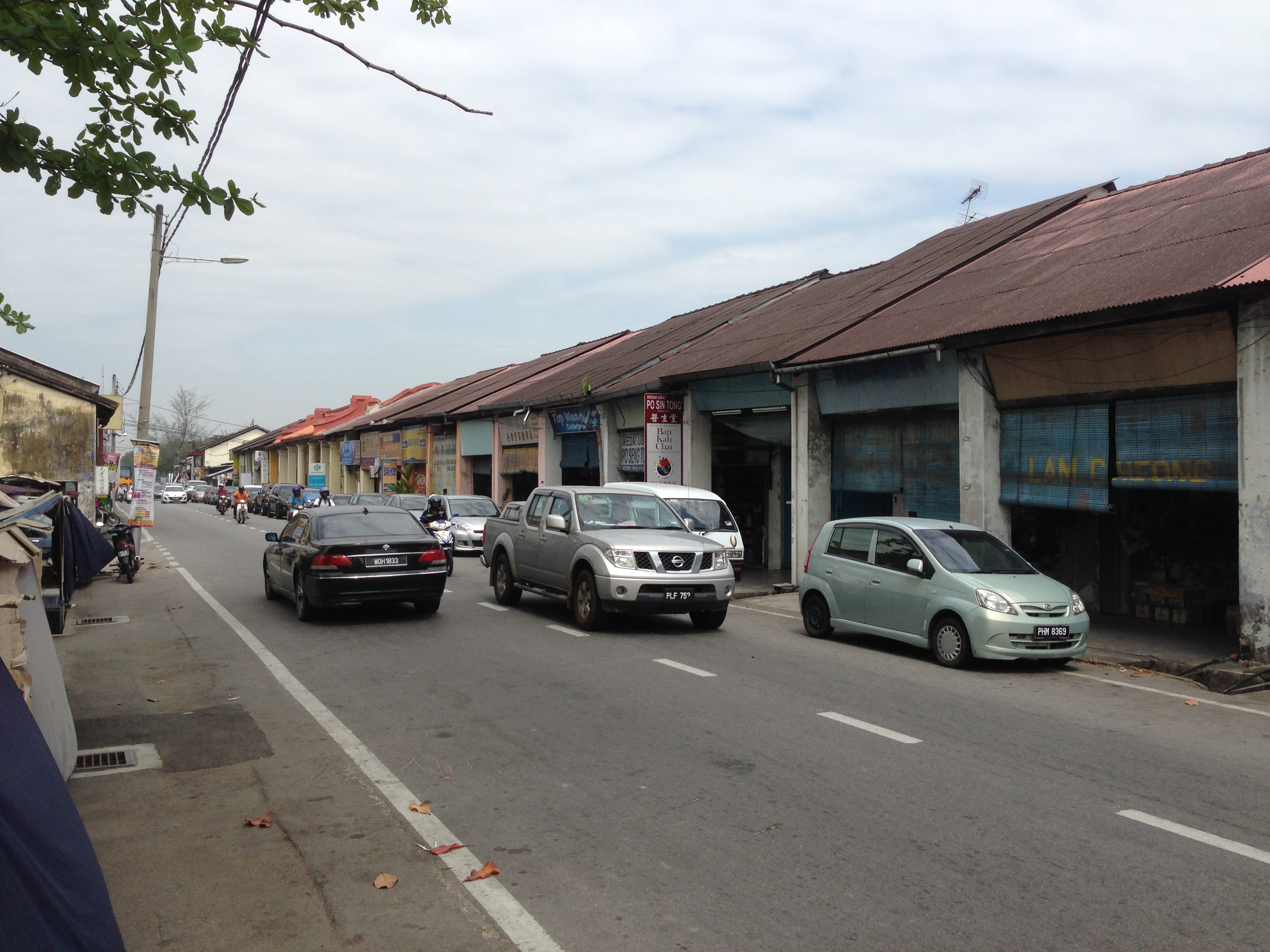

- Location within Seberang Perai in Penang
- Coordinates: 5°13′22″N 100°29′40″E
- Country: Malaysia
- State: Penang
- City: Seberang Perai
- District: South Seberang Perai

Area
  - Total: 0.1 km^{2} (0.039 sq mi)

Population (2020)
  - Total: 240
  - Density: 2,400/km^{2} (6,200/sq mi)

Demographics
  - Ethnic groups: 59.2% Chinese; 19.6% Bumiputera; 19.2% Malay; 0.4% indigenous groups from Sabah and Sarawak; 20.8% Indian; 0.4% Non-citizens
- Time zone: UTC+8 (MST)
  - Summer (DST): Not observed
- Postal code: 14200

Sungai Bakap is a suburb of Seberang Perai in the Malaysian state of Penang.

== Geography ==
Map of Sungai Bakap.
Click link at the top right corner to zoom in.
1 Sungai Bakap Market

== Demographics ==
Ethnicities within Sungai Bakap in 2020
Ethnicities / Nationality	Percentage
Chinese	59.2%
Malays	19.2%
Other Bumiputeras	0.4%
Indians	20.8%
Non-Malaysians	0.4%

As of 2020, Sungai Bakap was home to a population of 240. Chinese formed over half of the population.

== Education ==
Sungai Bakap is served by four primary schools and a single high school.

Primary schools

- SRK Bakap Indah
- SRK Sungai Bakap
- SRJK (C) Chong Kuang
- SRJK (T) Sungai Bakap

High school

- SMK Sungai Bakap

== See also ==
- 2024 Sungai Bakap by-election
