= Teluk Air Tawar =

- Suburb of Seberang Perai
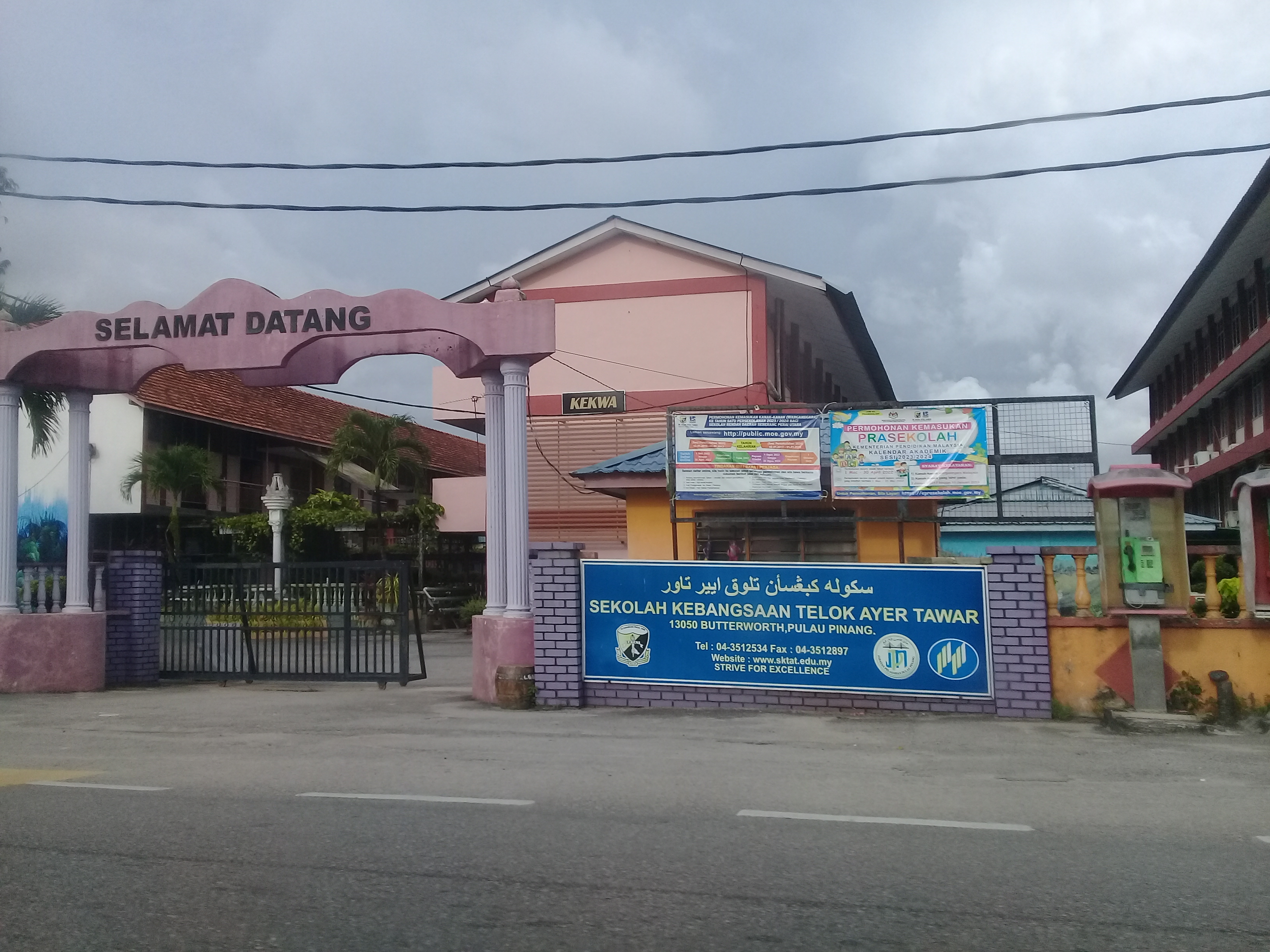
- SK Telok Ayer Tawar from Jalan Telok Ayer Tawar FT1.

- Location within Seberang Perai in Penang
- Coordinates: 5°28′0″N 100°23′0″E
- Country: Malaysia
- State: Penang
- City: Seberang Perai
- District: North Seberang Perai

Area
  - Total: 12.5 km^{2} (4.8 sq mi)

Population (2020)
  - Total: 21,202
  - Density: 1,700/km^{2} (4,390/sq mi)

Demographics
  - Ethnic groups: 71.3% Bumiputera; 71.0% Malay; 0.3% indigenous groups from Sabah and Sarawak; 19.0% Chinese; 6.4% Indian; 0.2% Other ethnicities; 3.1% Non-citizens
- Time zone: UTC+8 (MST)
  - Summer (DST): Not observed
- Postal code: 13050

Teluk Air Tawar is a suburb of Seberang Perai in the Malaysian state of Penang. Teluk Air Tawar means "Clear water bay" in the Malay language. This coastal suburb has a scenic view of George Town across the sea and is home to the Royal Malaysian Air Force (RMAF) base.

== Geography ==
Map of Teluk Air Tawar.
Click link at the top right corner to zoom in.
1 RMAF Butterworth
2 Pekan Darat
3 Permatang Binjai
4 Permatang Panjang
5 Permatang Tok Gelam
6 Taman Air Tawar Indah
7 Taman Nakhoda
8 Taman Robina
9 Taman Sejahtera Indah

== Demographics ==
Ethnicities within Teluk Air Tawar in 2020
Ethnicities / Nationality	Percentage
Malays	71.0%
Other Bumiputeras	0.3%
Chinese	19.0%
Indians	6.4%
Others	0.2%
Non-Malaysians	3.1%

As of 2020, Mukim 7, the subdivision that contains Teluk Air Tawar, was home to a population of 21,202. Malays comprised 71% of the population, followed by Chinese at 19% and Indians at 6%.

== Infrastructure ==
=== Expressways ===
North bound

- 10 kilometres (6.2 mi) from Hentian Sebelah Tikam Batu (Tikam Batu Side Stop)
- 45 kilometres (28 mi) from Gurun Rest Area
- 95 kilometres (59 mi) from Hentian Sebelah Kepala Batas

South bound

- 42 kilometres (26 mi) from Sungai Juru Rest Area
- 65 kilometres (40 mi) from Hentian Sebelah Sungai Bakap
- 87 metres (285 ft) from Hentian Sebelah Alor Pongsu

== Transport ==
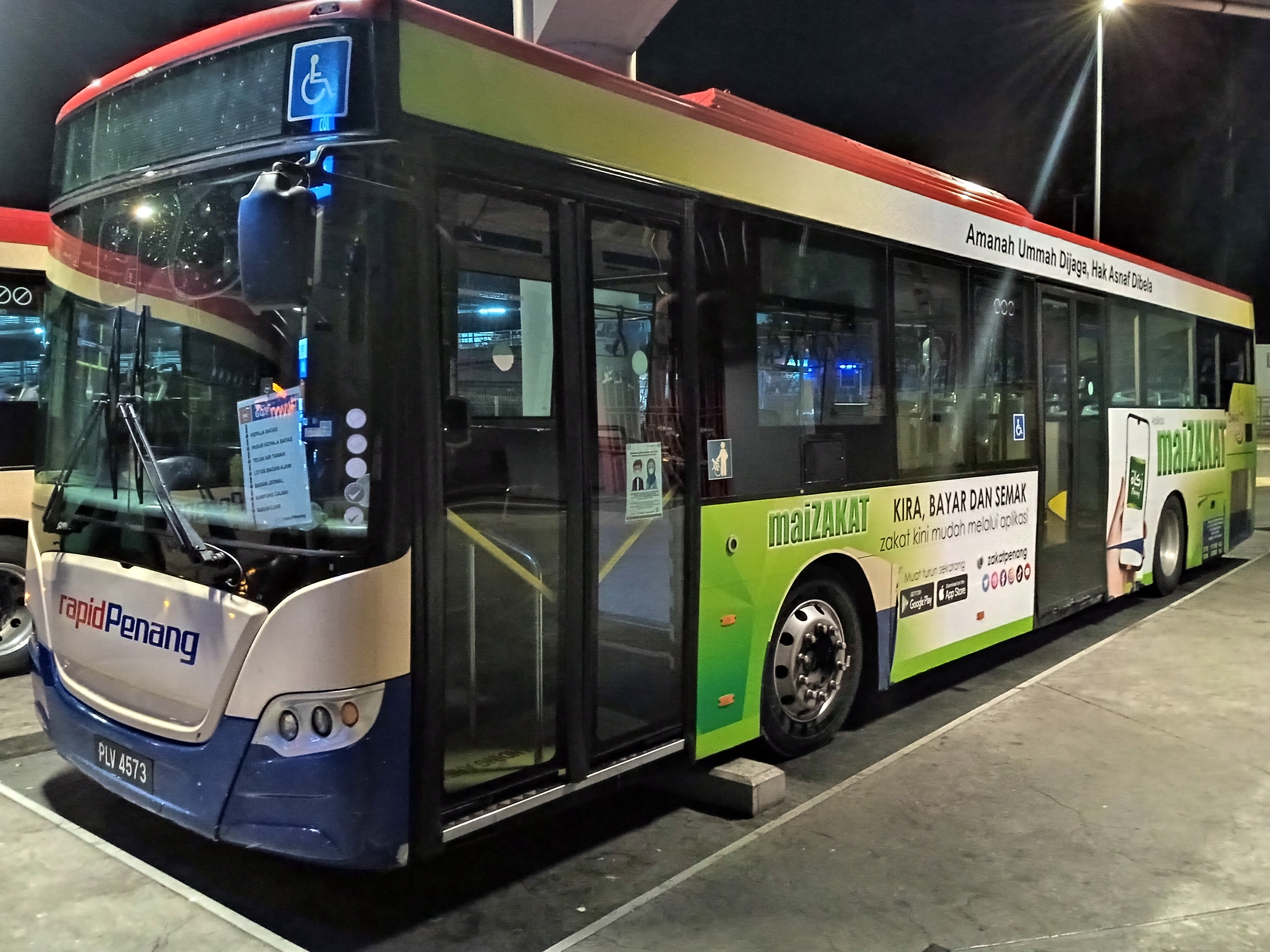
Rapid Penang bus route 601 at Penang Sentral

The area is accessible by Rapid Penang bus route 601 (Penang Sentral Bus Terminal–Kepala Batas), along Jalan Teluk Air Tawar, part of Malaysia Federal Route 1.

== Notable people ==
- Nassier Wahab, Malaysian singer and actor
- Maya Karin, Malaysian film actress, television host and singer
