= Mak Mandin =

- Suburb of Seberang Perai
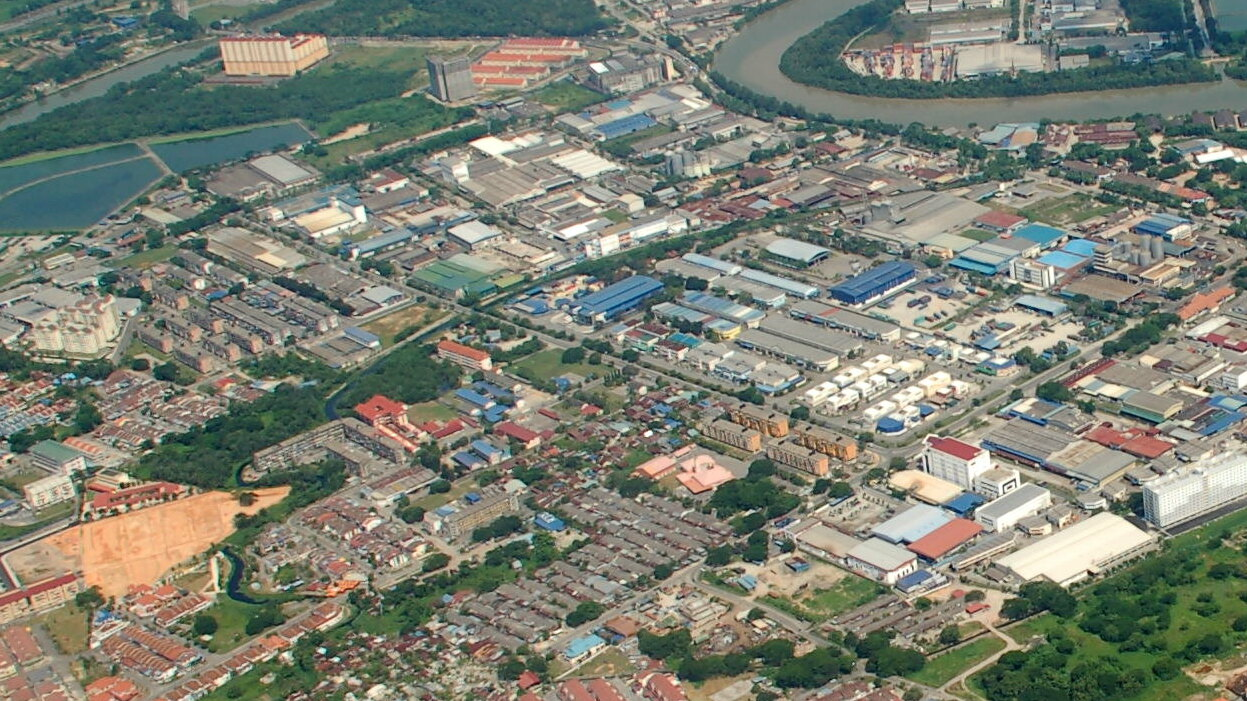
- Interactive map of Mak Mandin
- Location within Seberang Perai in Penang
- Coordinates: 5°25′50.117″N 100°23′27.308″E
- Country: Malaysia
- State: Penang
- City: Seberang Perai
- District: North Seberang Perai

Area
  - Total: 2.9 km^{2} (1.1 sq mi)

Population (2020)
  - Total: 21,938
  - Density: 7,600/km^{2} (20,000/sq mi)

Demographics
  - Ethnic groups: 86.6% Chinese; 4.0% Bumiputera; 3.7% Malay; 0.3% indigenous groups from Sabah and Sarawak; 5.2% Indian; 0.5% Other ethnicities; 3.7% Non-citizens
- Time zone: UTC+8 (MST)
  - Summer (DST): Not observed
- Postal code: 134xx

Mak Mandin is a suburb of Seberang Perai in the Malaysian state of Penang. There are Chinese, Tamil and National schools, a police station, a post office, a clinic and various light industrial factories which mainly produce foods, stationery, plastic bags and other consumer products.

== Geography ==
Map of Mak Mandin.
Click link at the top right corner to zoom in.
1 Kampung Baru
2 Taman Baiduri
3 Taman Mesra Permai
4 Taman Segar
5 Taman Tanjung Indah

== Demographics ==
Ethnicities within Mak Mandin in 2020
Ethnicities / Nationality	Percentage
Chinese	86.6%
Malays	3.7%
Other Bumiputeras	0.3%
Indians	5.2%
Others	0.5%
Non-Malaysians	3.7%

As of 2020, Mukim 14, the subdivision that contains Mak Mandin, was home to a population of 21,938. It was the most densely populated area within the city of Seberang Perai, with a population density of 7,565/km^{2} (19,590/sq mi). Ethnic Chinese comprised nearly 87% of the population, followed by Indians at 5%.
