= Bukit Minyak =

- Suburb of Seberang Perai
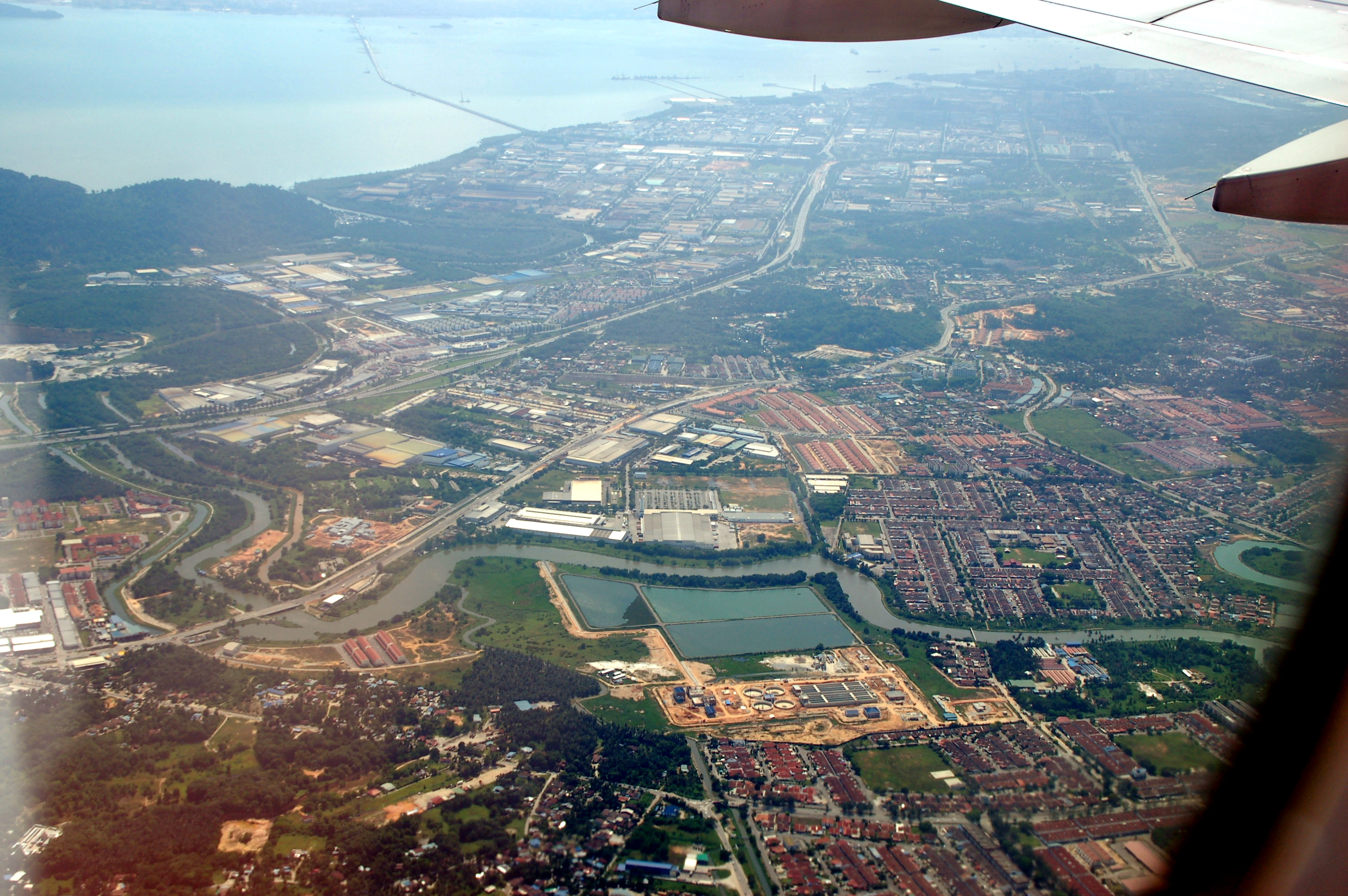
- Interactive map of Bukit Minyak
- Location within Seberang Perai in Penang
- Coordinates: 5°18′16″N 100°27′8″E
- Country: Malaysia
- State: Penang
- City: Seberang Perai
- District: Central Seberang Perai

Area
  - Total: 13.9 km^{2} (5.4 sq mi)

Population (2020)
  - Total: 24,982
  - Density: 1,800/km^{2} (4,650/sq mi)

Demographics
  - Ethnic groups: 35.9% Chinese; 29.2% Bumiputera; 28.9% Malay; 0.3% indigenous groups from Sabah and Sarawak; 12.8% Indian; 0.8% Other ethnicities; 21.2% Non-citizens
- Time zone: UTC+8 (MST)
  - Summer (DST): Not observed
- Postal code: 140xx to 141xx

Bukit Minyak is a suburb of Seberang Perai in the Malaysian state of Penang. It is home to an eponymous industrial park.

== Geography ==
Map of Bukit Minyak.
Click link at the top right corner to zoom in.
1 Bukit Minyak Industrial Park
2 Penang Science Park
3 Juru Light Industrial Park
4 Taman Bukit Minyak Indah
5 Taman Seri Delima

== Demographics ==
Ethnicities within Bukit Minyak in 2020
Ethnicities / Nationality	Percentage
Chinese	35.9%
Malays	28.9%
Other Bumiputeras	0.3%
Indians	12.8%
Others	0.8%
Non-Malaysians	21.2%

As of 2020, Mukim 13, the subdivision that contains Bukit Minyak, was home to a population of 24,982. Ethnic Chinese comprised nearly 36% of the population, followed by Malays at 28%. Bukit Minyak contained a substantial non-citizen community, which constituted over 21% of the population.
