= Orang Asal =

Indigenous peoples of East Malaysia

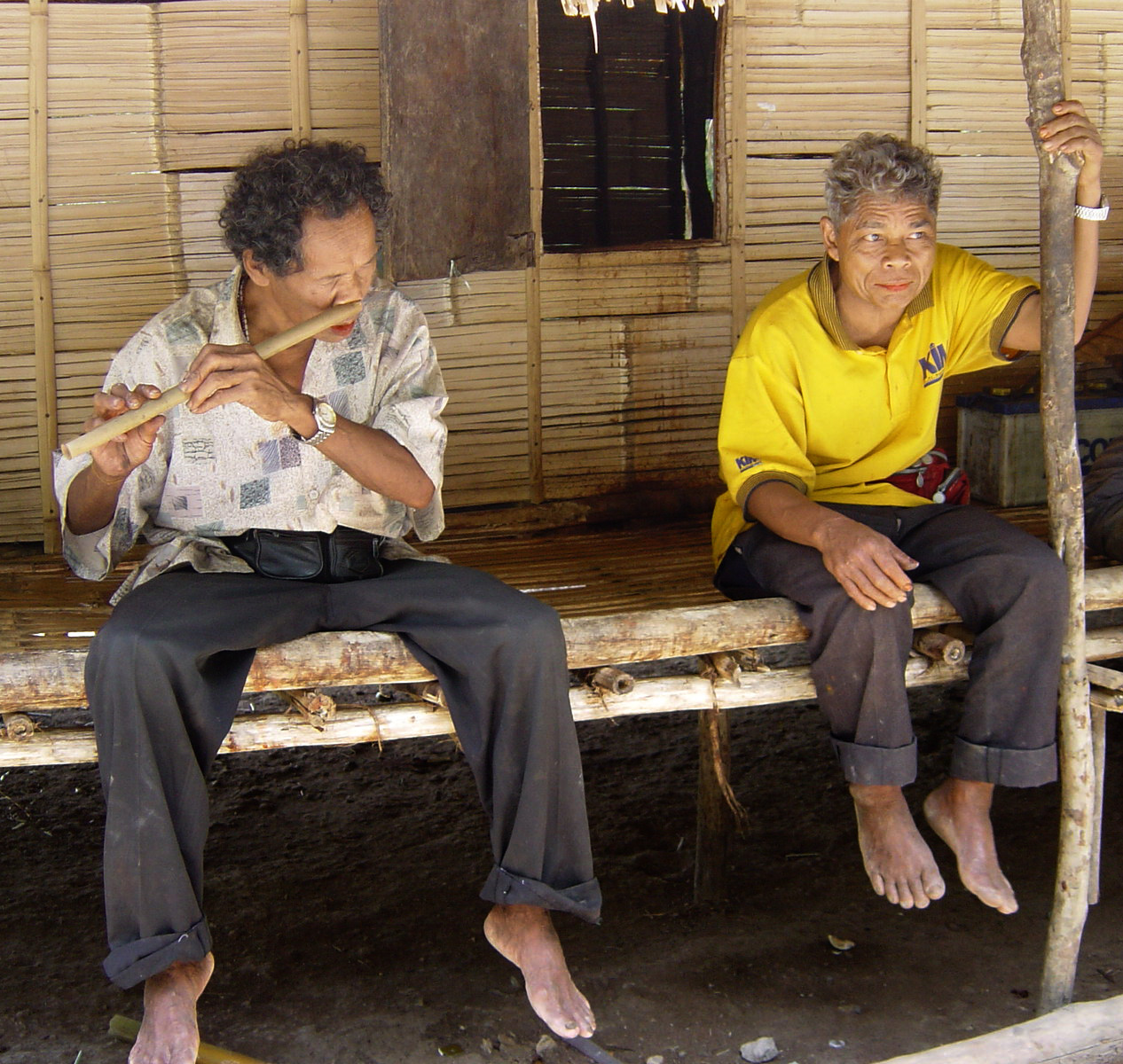
Indigenous peoples from Peninsular Malaysia

The Orang Asal are the indigenous peoples of Malaysia. The term is Malay for 'original people', used to refer to the aboriginals of Sabah, Sarawak, and Peninsular Malaysia. These groups are given the Bumiputera status in Malaysia.

The Orang Asal in Peninsular Malaysia are collectively known as the Orang Asli and are minorities on the Peninsula, whereas the Orang Asal of East Malaysia form a majority of the population.

== Etymology ==
The term Orang Asal means 'original people'. It was originally used by Communist insurgents in the Malayan Emergency in order to gain the support of these tribal groups.

== Status ==
The government considers most Orang Asal to be Bumiputera and grants them certain privileges. However, their societies remain marginalised, and they have been labelled as "second-class Bumiputeras" in contrast with the ethnic Malays. An ongoing issue is in regards to land, which is often taken for development purposes. This has caused many issues, including court cases and divisions between federal and state governments. In addition, illegal logging often occurs on what is considered traditional land of the Orang Asal. Issues have also occurred in relation to immigration, with immigrants often given identity cards ahead of the Orang Asal. In addition, many have also been pressed to assimilate into mainstream culture and convert to Islam. Orang Asal are often moved in response to development; the incomplete Bakun Dam in Sarawak has forced 11,000 to move.

== Divisions ==
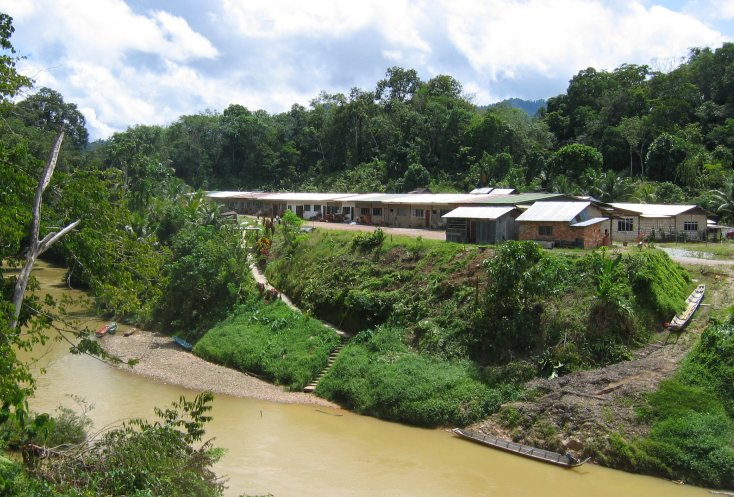
Iban Longhouse constructed using modern materials

Orang Asal are located throughout Malaysia, making up 11% of the population, about 2.1 million people. Orang Asal is an overarching term, encompassing all indigenous people on both Peninsula and East Malaysia.

Those on the Peninsula are known more specifically as the Orang Asli; they number around 149,500 and make up only 0.7% of the total Malaysian population. They are officially 19 ethnic subgroups, classed as either Negrito, Senoi, or Proto-Malay.

Some numbers differ, but East Malaysia contains a total of about 64 indigenous groups, around 39 in Sabah and 25 in Sarawak. The Orang Asal make up 60% of Sabah's population, and 50% of Sarawak's population. Sabah's population is hugely diverse, with over 50 languages and 80 dialects spoken. The largest group on Sarawak is the Iban.

== Culture ==
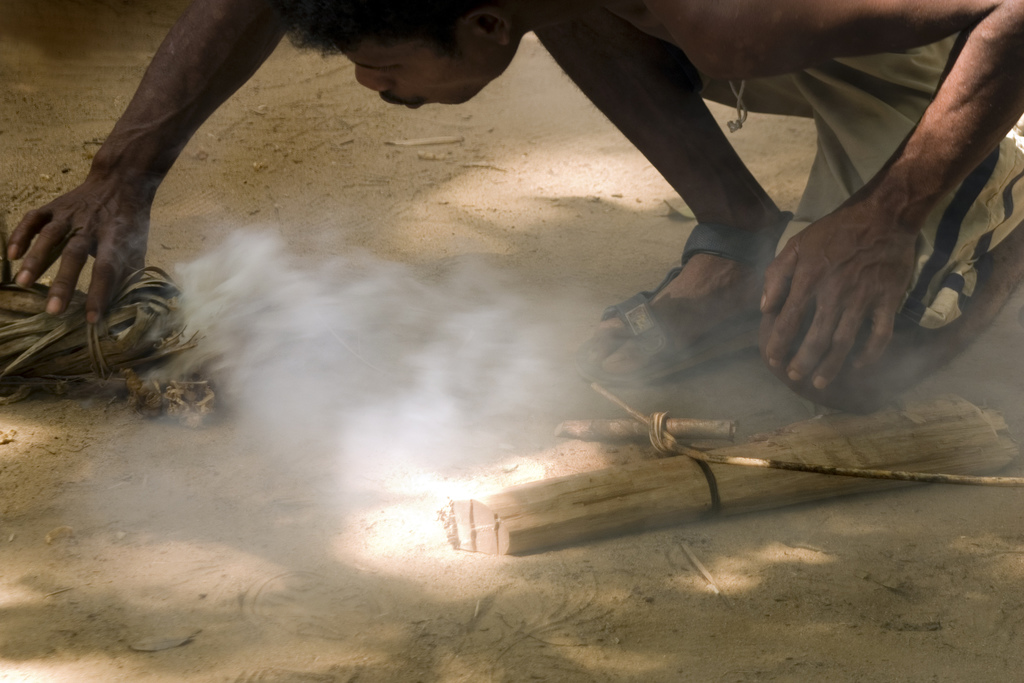
An Orang asli man starting a fire

The Orang Asal have their own religions and customs, as well as unique languages. The languages spoken are generally from the Austronesian and Austroasiatic language families. The languages of the peninsula can be grouped into Negrito, Senoi, and Malayic, which together can be divided into about 18 subgroups. However, all these languages are in danger of being lost as the children in the tribes learn Malay and English. The primary languages in East Malaysia are Kadazan-Dusun and Iban, both used by many indigenous groups. In contrast to the indigenous languages of the peninsula, these languages are commonly used in everyday life.

In the peninsula each subgroup is culturally distinct from the others, with lifestyles varying from fishermen to farmers to hunter-gatherers. Although many are now settled due to the intrusion of modern life, some remain semi-nomadic.

The people of Sabah are traditionally subsistence farmers, although nowadays they are becoming more involved in local government. Many Orang Asal in Sarawak subsist on rice, supplementing the meal with hunting. Some also remain semi-nomadic. The Orang Asal of East Malaysia are known for their artwork such as wooden masks.

== See also ==
- Demographics of Malaysia
