= Perai =

- Suburb of Seberang Perai
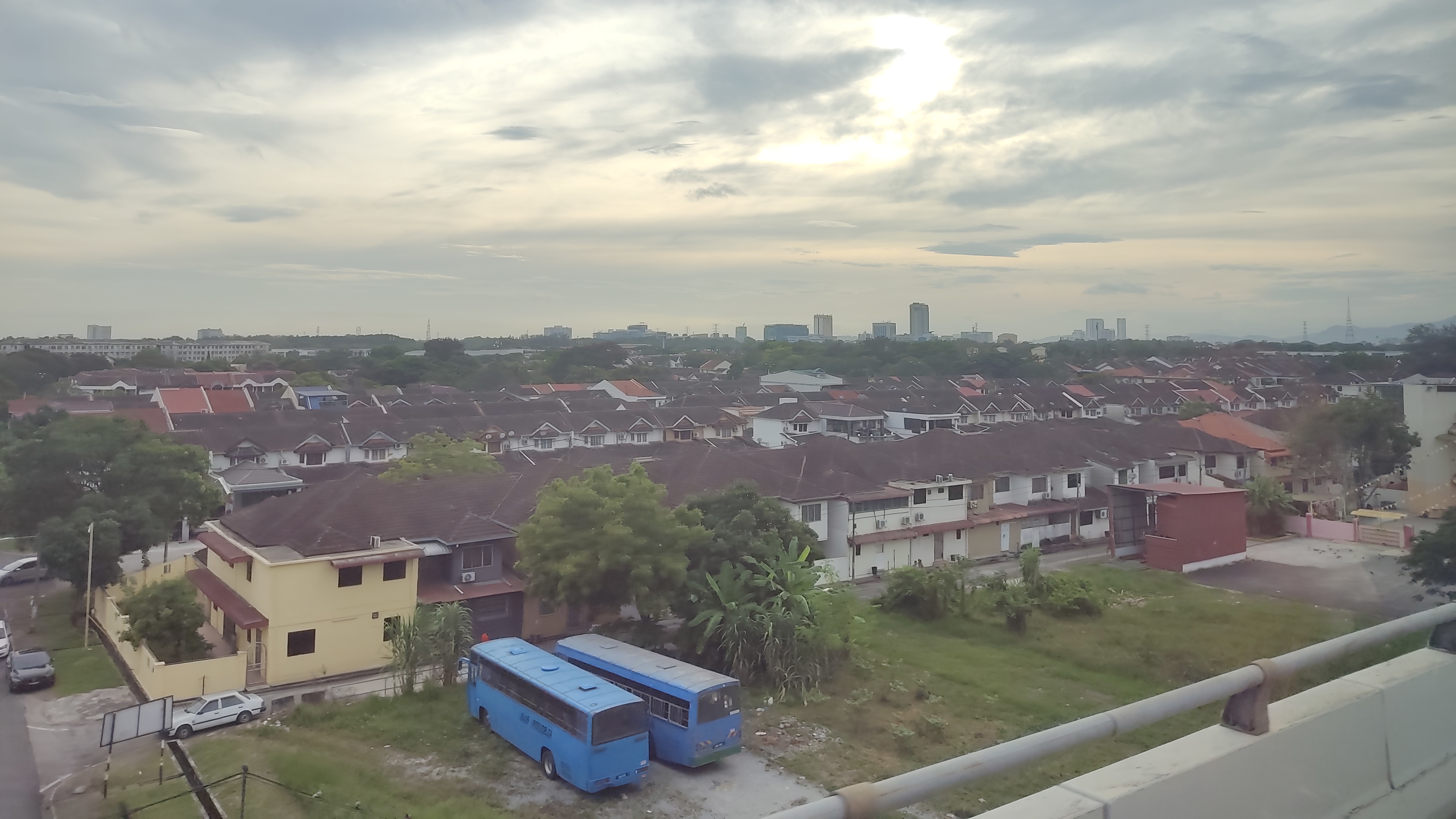
- Taman Inderawasih and the vicinity residential high rise in Perai

- Location within Seberang Perai in Penang
- Coordinates: 5°22′40.263″N 100°23′56.9898″E
- Country: Malaysia
- State: Penang
- City: Seberang Perai
- District: Central Seberang Perai

Area
  - Total: 5.2 km^{2} (2.0 sq mi)

Population (2020)
  - Total: 16,150
  - Density: 3,100/km^{2} (8,000/sq mi)

Demographics
  - Ethnic groups: 33.1% Chinese; 25.3% Indian; 25.2% Bumiputera; 24.8% Malay; 0.4% indigenous groups from Sabah and Sarawak; 0.6% Other ethnicities; 15.8% Non-citizens
- Time zone: UTC+8 (MST)
  - Summer (DST): Not observed
- Postal code: 136xx to 137xx

Perai is a suburb of Seberang Perai in the Malaysian state of Penang. It lies at the southern bank of the Perai River and borders Butterworth to the north.

The area now known as Perai was obtained by the British East India Company in 1800, with the Perai River serving as the boundary between the newly acquired British territory and Kedah to the north. A nascent railway line was built between Perai and Perak in the 1890s, transforming Perai into a transit point for the export of tin. Perai became heavily industrialised in the late 20th century.

Today, Perai is home to an eponymous industrial zone, as well as the adjacent township of Seberang Jaya. The town is connected to Penang Island via the Penang Bridge and contains several facilities of the Port of Penang.

== Etymology ==
Perai, situated at the estuary of the Perai River, lent its name from the waterway. Upon the acquisition of the area by the British East India Company in 1800, the river was known in Thai as plai (ปลาย), which meant "the end", as it formed the border between British Province Wellesley and the Siamese vassal state of Kedah; the Perai River thus marked the southernmost limit of Siamese influence. British maps of the era referred to the southern banks of the Perai River as Prye.

== History ==
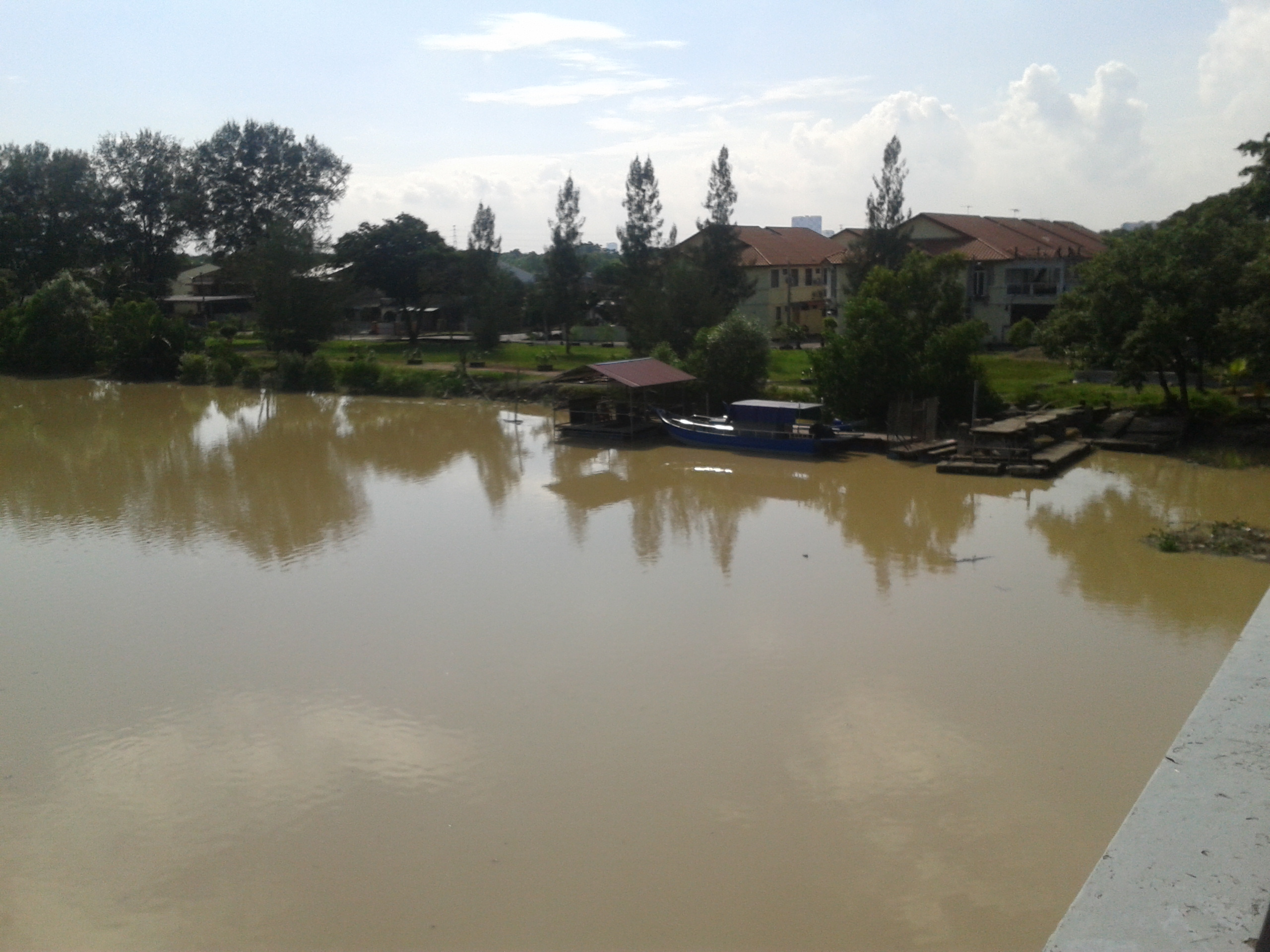
Riverine piers at Perai

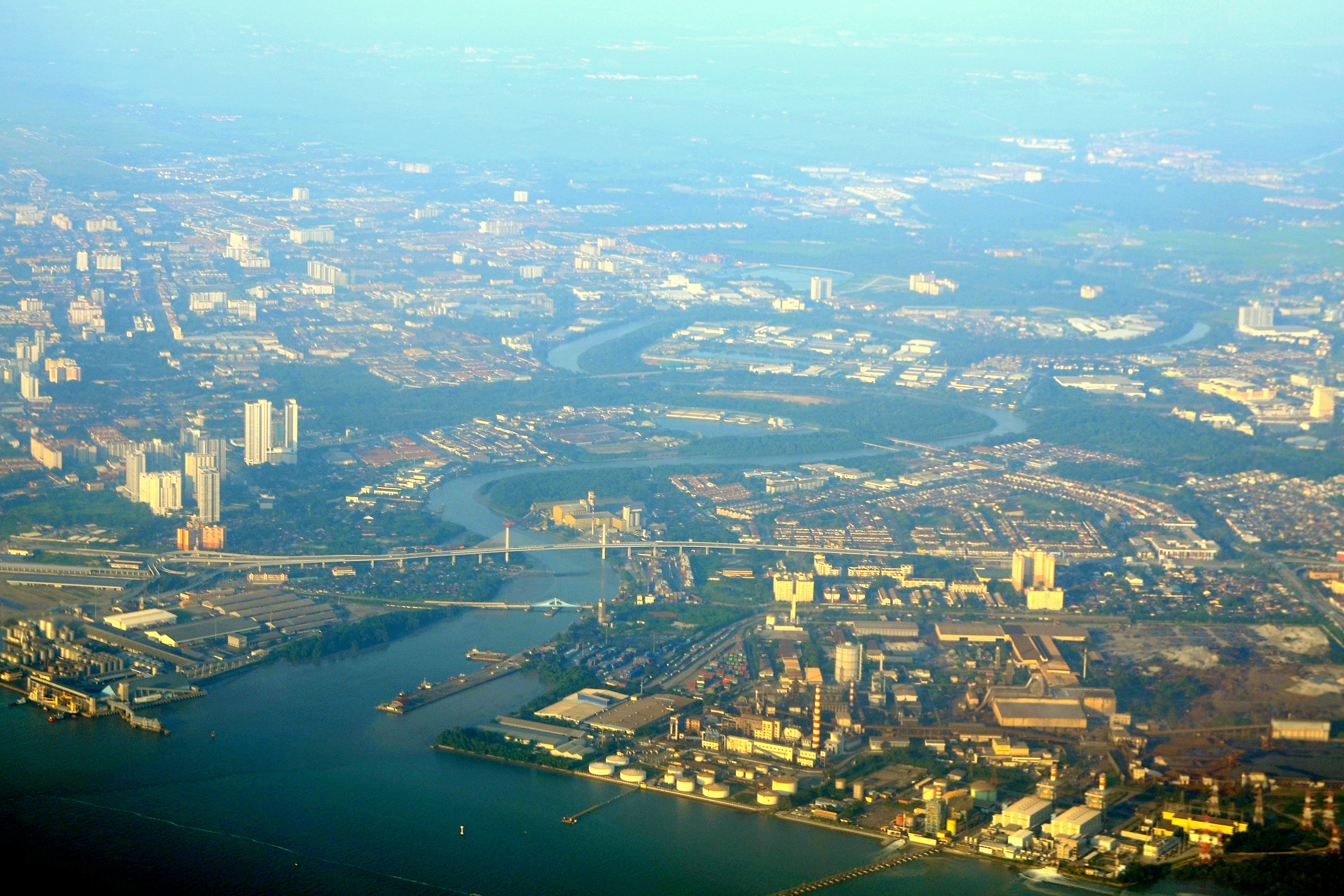
Aerial view of the Perai River estuary with Bagan Dalam (left) and Perai (right)

The settlement of Perai was formed in the early 19th century, following the acquisition of the area by the British East India Company. In its early years, agriculture formed the mainstay of Perai's economy, with sugar plantations being established within the settlement.

Perai was developed into an entrepôt towards the end of the 19th century. At the height of a tin-mining boom in the Malay Peninsula, a nascent rail line was built between Perai and the neighbouring state of Perak in the 1890s. Perai then became a transportation hub, where tin imported from Perak was loaded onto vessels to be shipped to George Town.

The industrialisation of Perai began in 1980, when the Penang Development Corporation (PDC) commenced the development of the Perai Free Industrial Zone and the nearby township of Seberang Jaya. In 1974, the Port of Penang was relocated from George Town to Seberang Perai. Cargo and container facilities were built in both Perai and neighbouring Butterworth, substantially boosting the economy of the area.

In 1985, the Penang Bridge which links Perai and Penang Island was completed. The bridge was the longest in Southeast Asia until 2014, upon the opening of the Second Penang Bridge further south.

== Geography ==
Perai lies at the estuary of the Perai River, which empties into the Penang Strait. The suburb is located at the river's southern bank, bordering Butterworth to the north, and spans an area of 5.2 km^{2} (2.0 sq mi). The Perai Free Industrial Zone encompasses much of Perai's seafront between the Perai River and the Penang Bridge.

Map of Perai.
Click link at the top right corner to zoom in.
1 Perai Wharves
2 Perai FIZ
3 Prai River Bridge
4 Taman Inderawasih
5 Ampang Jajar

== Demographics ==
Ethnicities within Perai in 2020
Ethnicities / Nationality	Percentage
Chinese	33.1%
Indians	25.3%
Malays	24.8%
Other Bumiputeras	0.4%
Others	0.6%
Non-Malaysians	15.8%

As of 2020, Perai was home to a population of 16,150. Ethnic Chinese comprised over 33% of the population, followed by Indians and Malays at about 25% each. Industrialisation has created a substantial non-citizen community at Perai, constituting close to 16% of the population.

== Economy ==
The Perai Free Industrial Zone is home to numerous multinational and local firms. The major local companies within the area include Malayan Sugar, Ann Joo Resources, Southern Steel, Harvik Rubber and Soon Soon Oilmills. Notably, Malaysia's oldest steel mill and the country's largest sugar refinery, owned by Ann Joo Resources and Malayan Sugar respectively, are situated within the industrial estate. The multinational companies within the area include Mattel, Pensonic, Hitachi, Mitsuoka, Chevron and Honeywell Aerospace.

Meanwhile, the Port of Penang, which operates two facilities within Perai, provides logistical connectivity to these heavy industries. Perai's industries are among the major contributors to the dry-bulk volume in the town's port facilities, which also handle shipments of coal and scrap metal.

== Transportation ==
=== Land ===
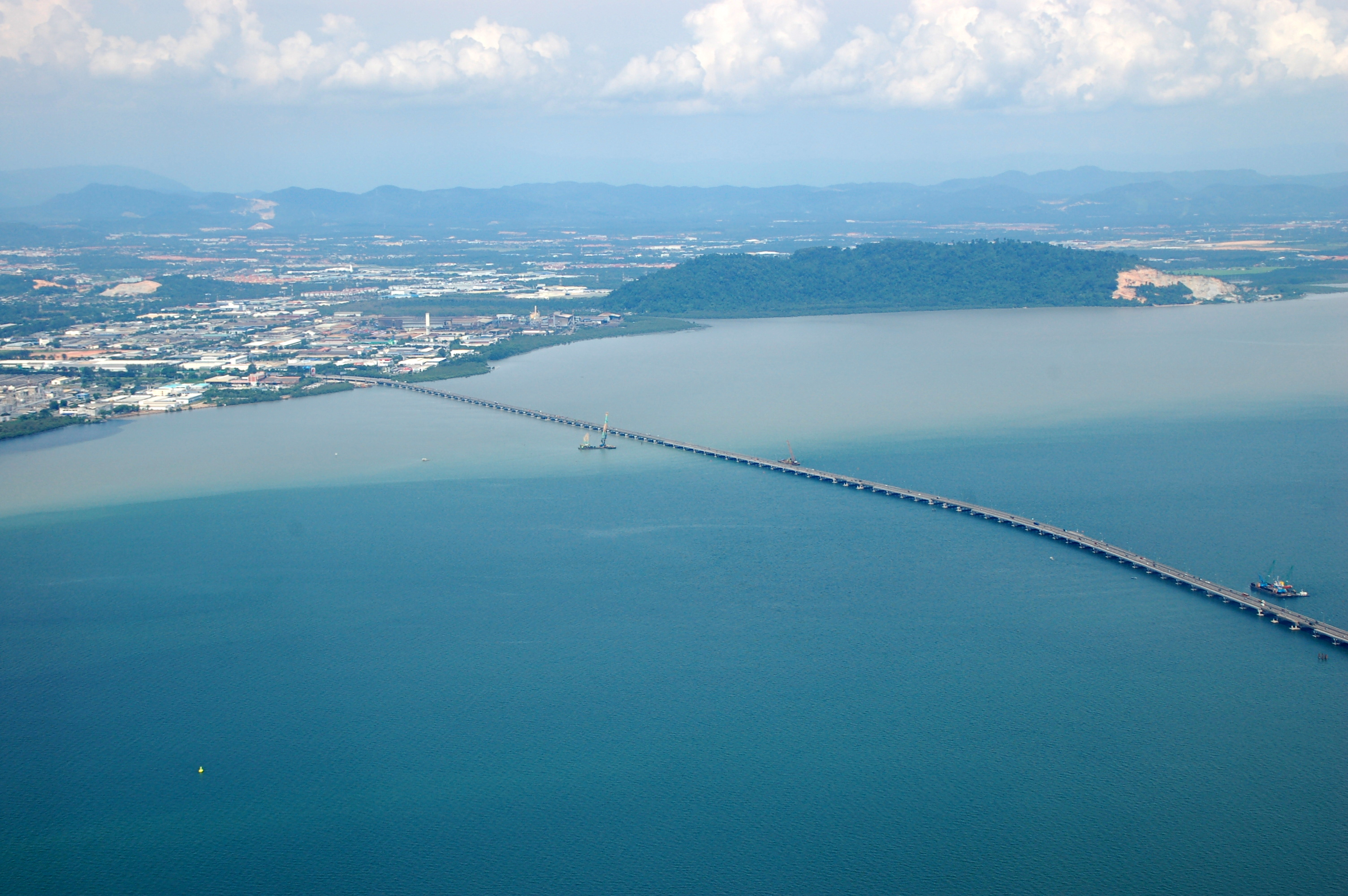
The Penang Bridge links Perai with Penang Island (not pictured).

Jalan Perusahaan Perai is the main thoroughfare within the heart of Perai proper. The road is linked to the Prai River Bridge, which spans the width of the Perai River between Perai and Butterworth. Meanwhile, the North–South Expressway runs through the neighbourhood of Seberang Jaya.

The Penang Bridge, opened in 1985, connects Perai with Gelugor on Penang Island.

Rapid Penang buses 701, 703, 709 and 801 serve the residents of Perai, connecting the town with Butterworth, Bukit Mertajam and Nibong Tebal. In addition, Rapid Penang operates Bridge Express Shuttle Transit (BEST) bus services towards Bayan Lepas on Penang Island, catering mainly to industrial workers, as well as an interstate bus service to the town of Sungai Petani in the neighbouring state of Kedah.

=== Sea ===
The Port of Penang has two facilities within Perai, namely the Perai Bulk Cargo Terminal and the Perai Wharves.

== Education ==
Perai contains nine primary schools, five high schools, an international school and a private tertiary institution.

Primary schools

- SRK St Mark
- SRK Jalan Baharu
- SRK Khir Johari
- SRK Seberang Jaya
- SRK Seberang Jaya 2
- SRK Taman Inderawasih
- SRJK (C) Chung Hwa 3
- SRJK (T) Perai
- SRJK (T) Ladang Prye

High schools

- SMK Pauh Jaya
- SMK Perai
- SMK Taman Inderawasih
- SMK Tun Hussein Onn
- SMK Seberang Jaya

International school

- Chinese Taipei School Penang

Private college

- Open University Malaysia

In addition to these schools, Seberang Jaya is home to the Penang State Library, the main public library of the State of Penang.

== Health care ==
The Seberang Jaya Hospital, run by Malaysia's Ministry of Health, is one of the six public hospitals scattered throughout the State of Penang. Situated within the neighbourhood of Seberang Jaya, it also serves as the main hospital within the entire municipality of Seberang Perai. The 393-bed hospital offers various specialist treatments and procedures, including general surgery, nephrology and obstetrics. An ongoing upgrade of the hospital, scheduled for completion by 2021, is expected to increase its capacity by 316 beds.

== Retail ==
Megamal Pinang

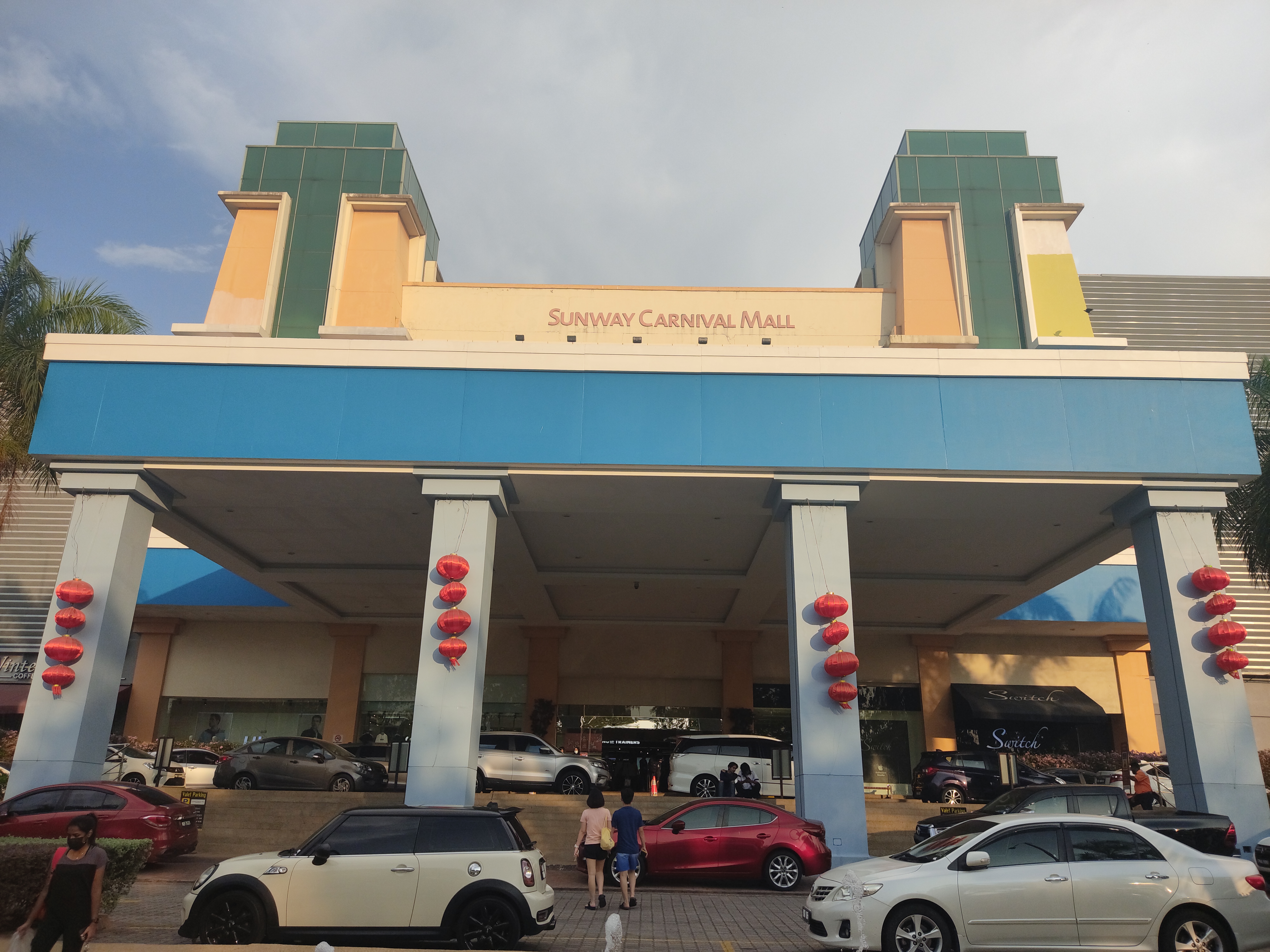
Sunway Carnival Mall at Seberang Jaya

Perai is home to some of the largest shopping malls within the entire Seberang Perai.

Within Perai proper, Megamal Pinang, built in the 1990s, is the main shopping mall. The mall contains four retail storeys, and is anchored by Mega Lanes and Mega Cineplex.

Sunway Carnival Mall at Seberang Jaya was opened in 2007 and is the flagship shopping centre of Sunway Group within the State of Penang. Its main anchor tenants are Parkson, NOKO, Jaya Grocer and GSC Cinemas. The mall also contains the Sunway Carnival Convention Centre, one of the major venues in Seberang Perai for meetings, incentives, conferences and exhibitions (MICE). An ongoing expansion of the mall is expected to increase the mall's gross floor area to 1,450,000 ft^{2} (135,000 m^{2}) by 2020.

In 2015, Mydin launched the Mydin Mall, its 20th wholesale hypermarket, at Jalan Baru. The mall has about 1,000,000 ft^{2} (93,000 m^{2}) of net lettable area, comprising 81 retail lots and a wholesale hypermarket. The mall is the largest Mydin outlet in Malaysia.

Currently under construction, GEM Megamall at Jalan Baru is slated to be the largest shopping mall within northern Malaysia, spanning a built-up area of 11.32 acres (45,800 m^{2}) and a net lettable area of 1,200,000 ft^{2} (110,000 m^{2}). The mall will feature the first ice-skating rink in northern Malaysia, a 38-lane bowling alley and GSC Cinemas' largest cineplex.
