= Seberang Jaya =

- Suburb of Seberang Perai
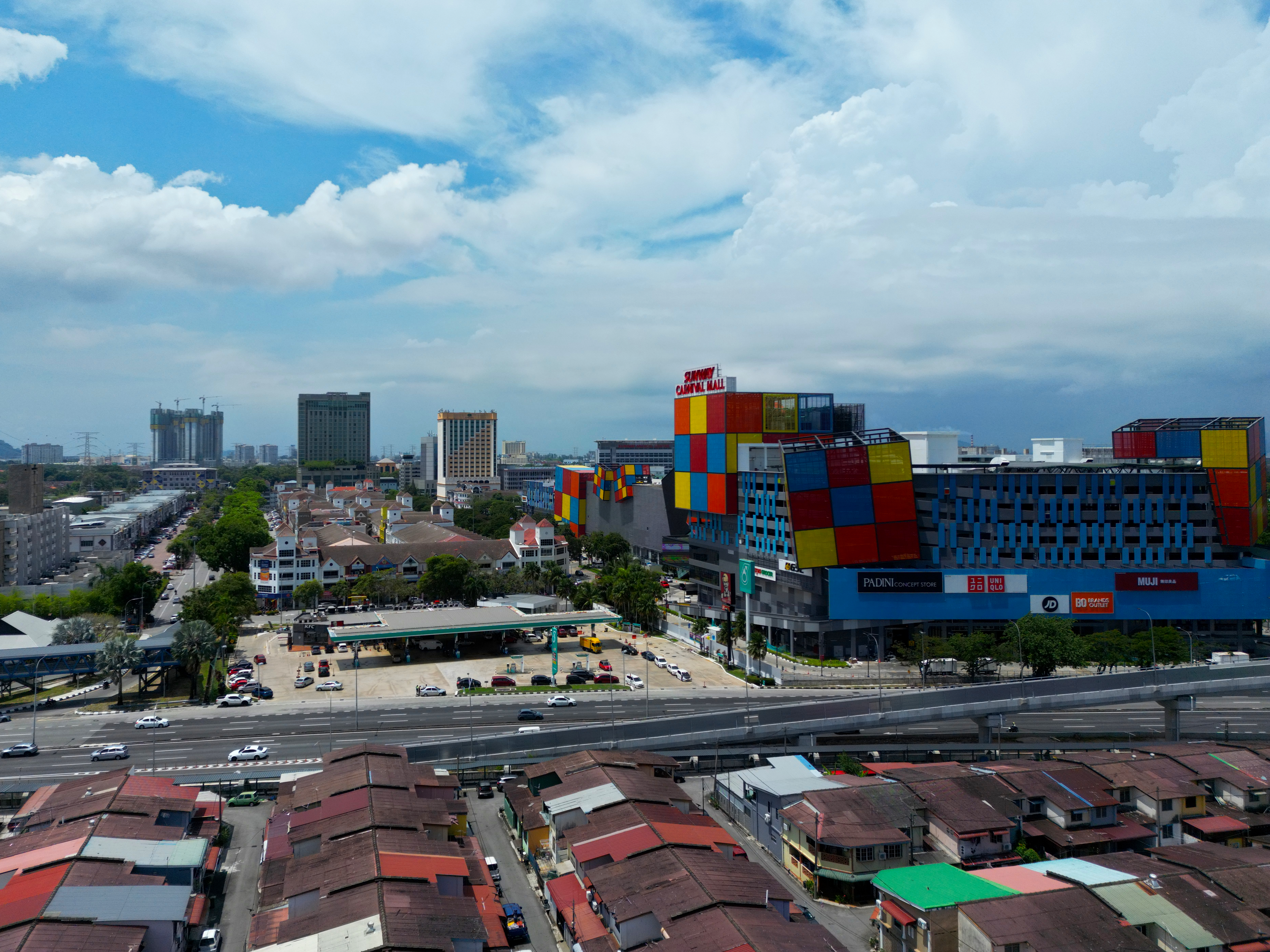

- Location within Seberang Perai in Penang
- Coordinates: 5°23′49.2″N 100°23′54.204″E
- Country: Malaysia
- State: Penang
- City: Seberang Perai
- District: Central Seberang Perai

Area
  - Total: 17.6 km^{2} (6.8 sq mi)

Population (2020)
  - Total: 48,785
  - Density: 2,770/km^{2} (7,180/sq mi)

Demographics
  - Ethnic groups: 45.7% Bumiputera; 45.4% Malay; 0.3% indigenous groups from Sabah and Sarawak; 22.7% Chinese; 15.6% Indian; 0.9% Other ethnicities; 15.2% Non-citizens
- Time zone: UTC+8 (MST)
  - Summer (DST): Not observed
- Postal code: 13700

Seberang Jaya is a suburb of Seberang Perai in the Malaysian state of Penang. Located at the southern bank of the Perai River and east of Perai proper, the area was developed in the 1970s. Since then, Seberang Jaya has evolved into a booming area, with various commercial and retail developments.

== History ==
The township of Seberang Jaya was built in 1970 by the Penang Development Corporation (PDC), in tandem with the establishment of the Perai Free Industrial Zone. The construction of the new township was aimed at providing a housing area adjacent to the newly built industries in Perai, and erasing social and economic inequalities between the urban and rural inhabitants.

== Geography ==
Map of Seberang Jaya.
Click link at the top right corner to zoom in.
1 Perai Bulk Cargo Terminal (PBCT)
2 Perai FIZ
3 Chai Leng Park
4 Sunway Carnival Mall
5 Megamal Pinang
6 Seberang Jaya Hospital
7 Sunway Medical Centre (SMC)
8 EPF Building
9 Penang State Library
10 Penang Bird Park
11 Karumariamman Temple
12 SP Arena

== Demographics ==
Ethnicities within Seberang Jaya in 2020
Ethnicities / Nationality	Percentage
Malays	45.4%
Other Bumiputeras	0.3%
Chinese	22.7%
Indians	15.6%
Others	0.9%
Non-Malaysians	15.2%

As of 2020, Mukim 1, the subdivision that contains Seberang Jaya, was home to a population of 48,785. Malays formed over 45% of the population, followed by Chinese at 22% and Indians at 15%. The suburb also had a substantial non-citizen community that made up another 15% of the population.

== Transportation ==
Two major highways cut through the heart of Seberang Jaya – the North–South Expressway and the Butterworth–Kulim Expressway. Both expressways intersect at the former's Interchange 163 within the centre of the township.

Rapid Penang's buses 703 and 709 connect the township with Butterworth and Bukit Mertajam. These are complemented by Rapid Penang's Congestion Alleviation Transport (CAT), a free-of-charge transit service within Seberang Jaya. In addition, Rapid Penang also operates Bridge Express Shuttle Transit (BEST) bus services towards Bayan Lepas on Penang Island, catering mainly to industrial workers, as well as an interstate bus service to the town of Sungai Petani in the neighbouring state of Kedah.

== Education ==
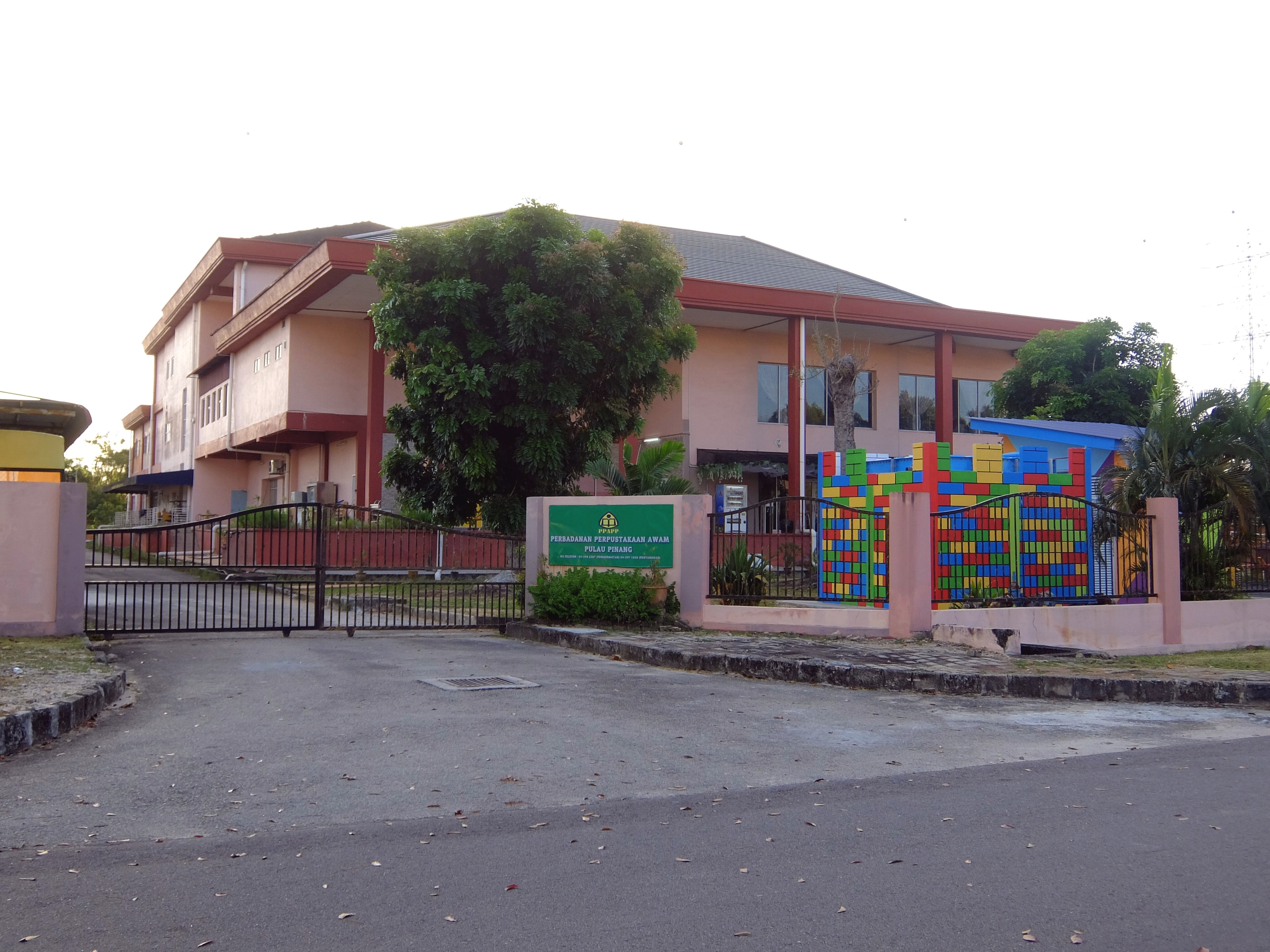
Penang State Library at Jalan Perpustakaan.

Seberang Jaya has two primary schools, two Secondary schools and a private tertiary institution.

Primary schools

- Seberang Jaya National Primary School
- Seberang Jaya 2 National Primary School

Secondary schools

- Tun Hussein Onn National Secondary School
- Seberang Jaya National Secondary School

Private college

- Open University Malaysia

Seberang Jaya is also home to the Penang State Library (Malay: Perpustakaan Negeri Pulau Pinang), the main public library of the State of Penang and the headquarters of the Penang Public Library Corporation (Malay: Perbadanan Perpustakaan Awam Pulau Pinang, abbreviated as PPLC or PPAPP).

== Health care ==
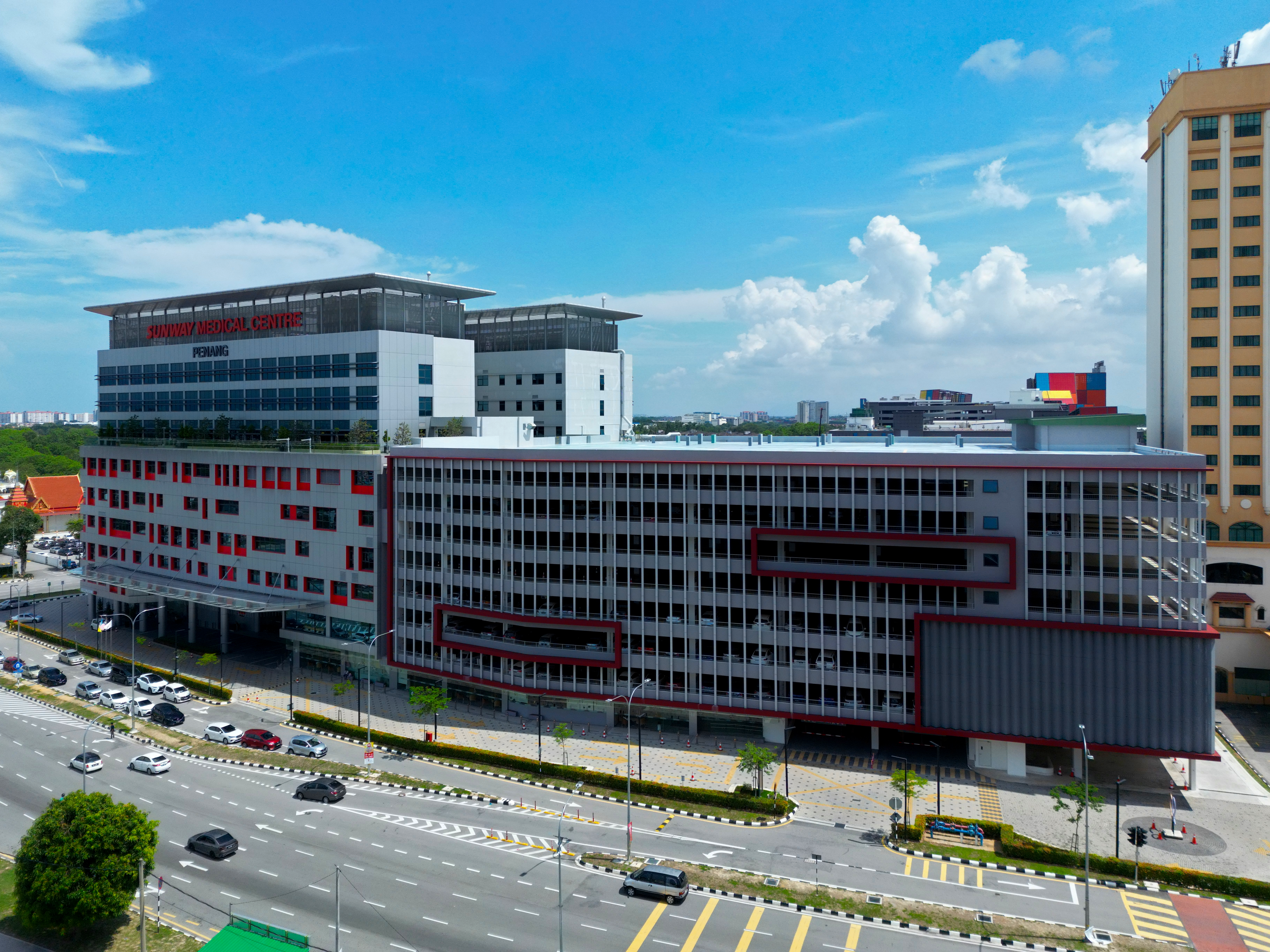
Sunway Medical Centre Penang

The Seberang Jaya Hospital, administered by Malaysia's Ministry of Health, is one of the six public hospitals scattered throughout the State of Penang. It also serves as the main hospital for the entire municipality of Seberang Perai. The 393-bed hospital offers various specialist treatments and procedures, such as general surgery, nephrology and obstetrics. An ongoing upgrade of the hospital, slated for completion by 2021, is expected to increase its capacity by 316 beds.

== Retail ==
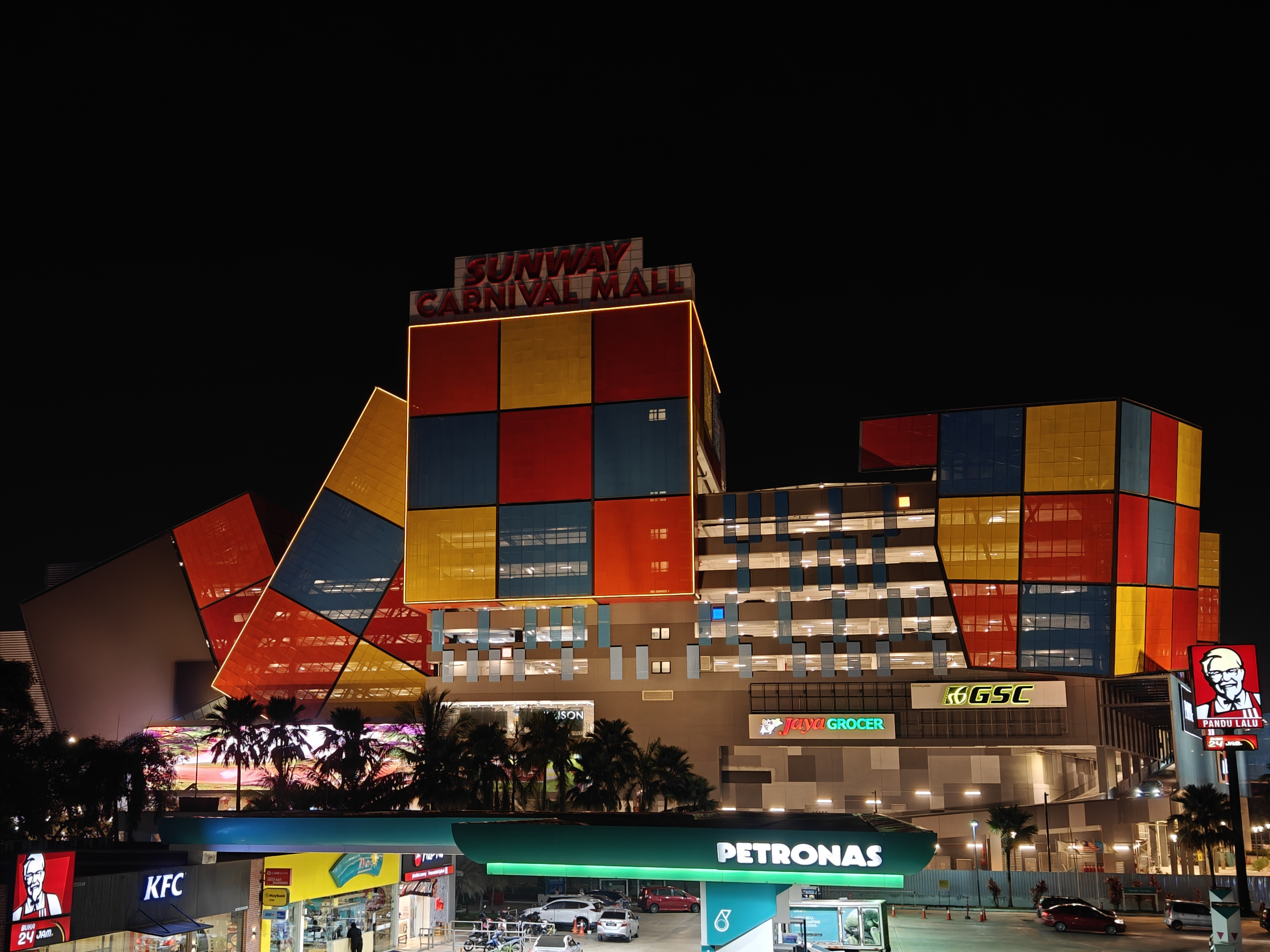
Sunway Carnival Mall

Sunway Carnival Mall, the sole shopping mall in Seberang Jaya, was opened in 2007 and is the flagship shopping centre of Sunway Group within the State of Penang. Its main anchor tenants include Parkson and Golden Screen Cinemas. The Sam's Groceria closed down during MCO and being replaced by Noko variety store. The mall also contains the Sunway Carnival Convention Centre, a major venue for meetings, incentives, conferences and exhibitions (MICE). An ongoing expansion of the mall is expected to increase its gross floor area to 1,450,000 ft^{2} (135,000 m^{2}) by 2022.

== Tourist attractions ==
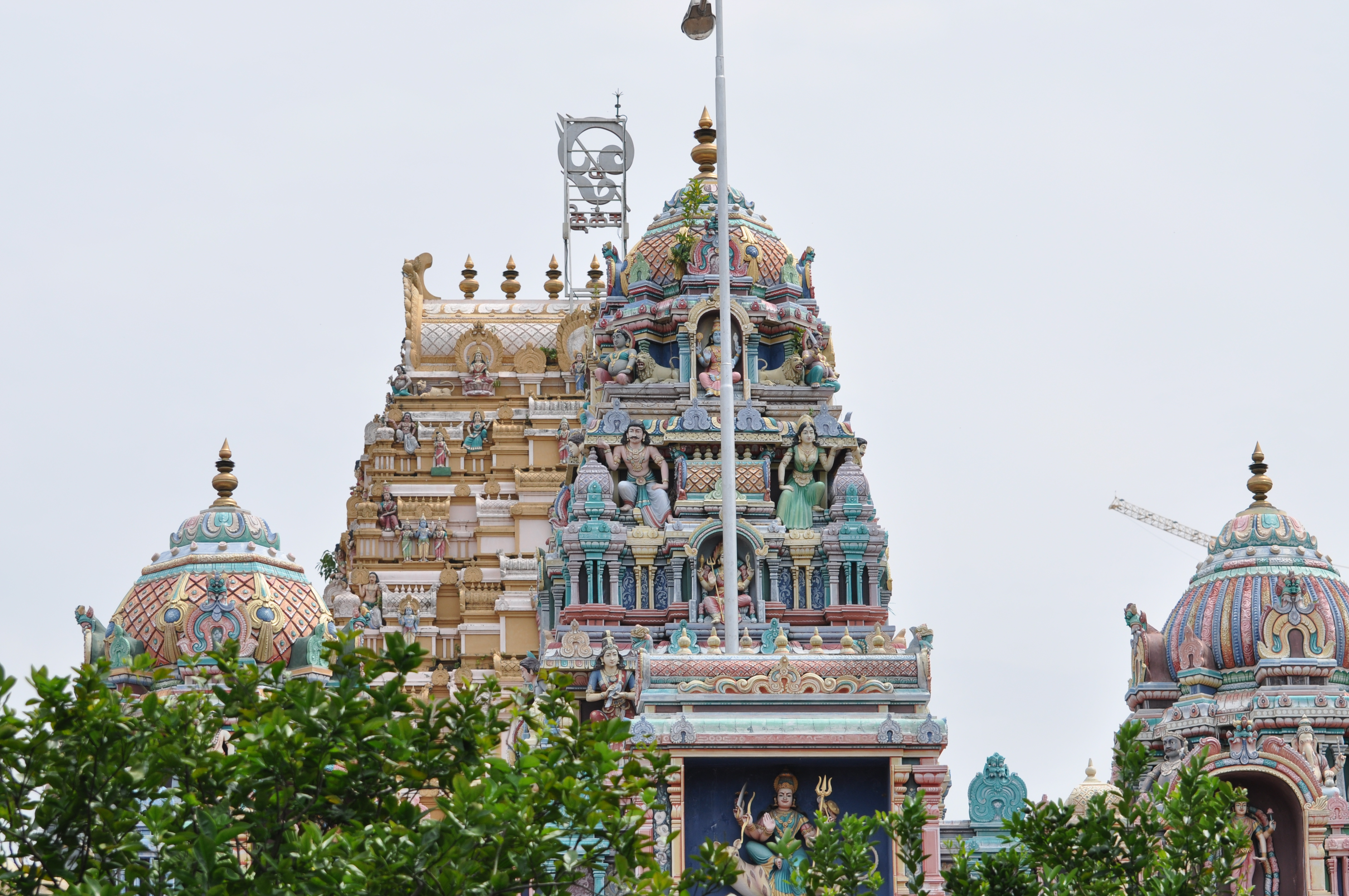
Arulmigu Karumariamman Temple at Jalan Todak

The Penang Bird Park, founded in 1988 (Opened on 26 November), was Malaysia's first aviary. It contains more than 300 species of birds, including sea eagles, flamingoes and hornbills.

Situated at Jalan Todak, the Arulmigu Karumariamman Temple has the largest gopuram, or main sculpture tower, in Malaysia, measuring 72 ft (22 m) tall.

== See also ==
- Bayan Baru
