= Sunway Medical Centre Penang =

Hospital in Penang, Malaysia

- Sunway Group
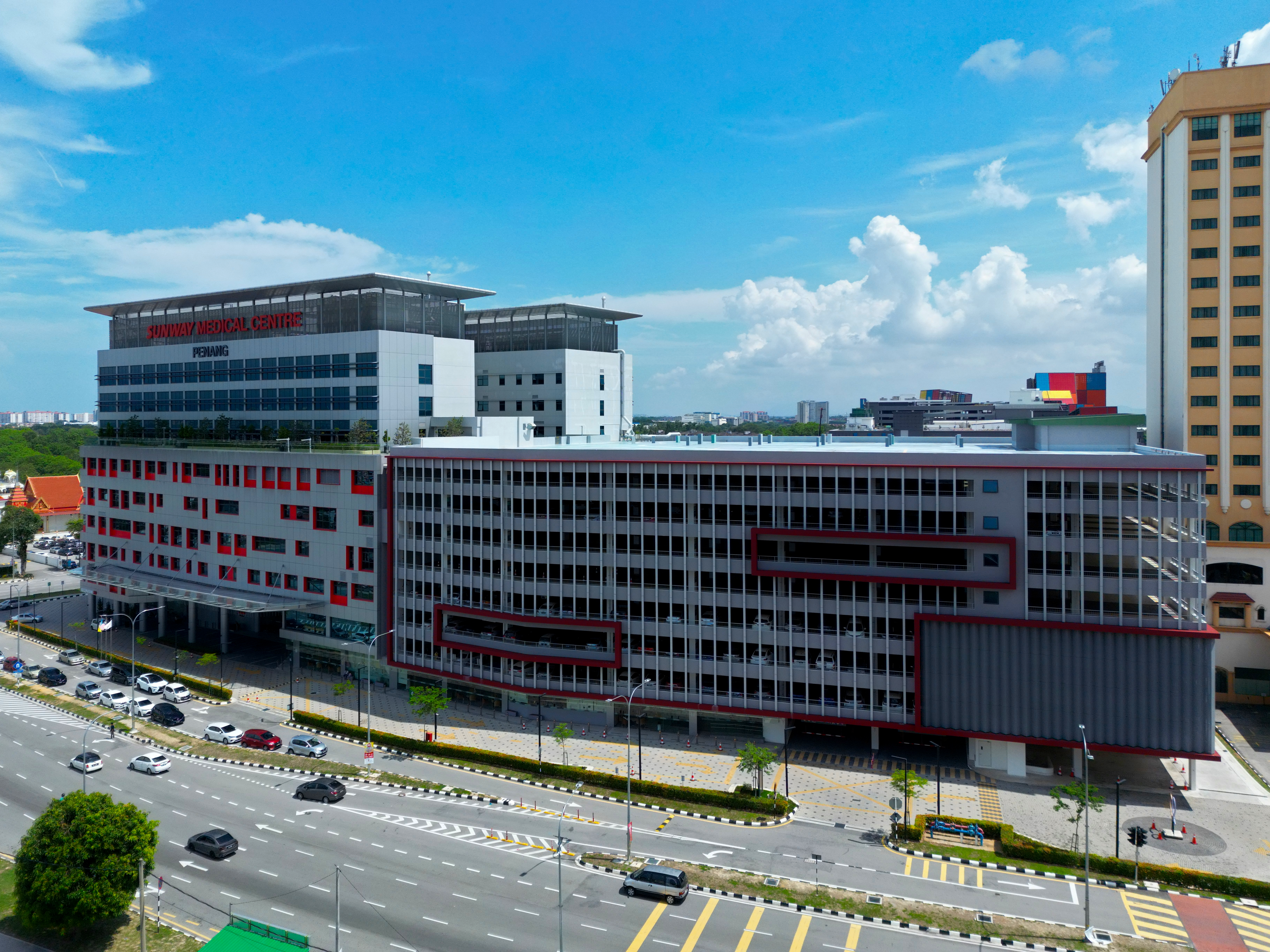

Geography
- Location: 3106, Lebuh Tenggiri 2, Seberang Jaya, 13700 Perai, Seberang Perai, Penang, Malaysia
- Coordinates: 5.395743°N 100.39671°E

Services
- Emergency department: Yes
- Beds: 330

History
- Founded: 2022

Links
- Website: www.sunwaymedicalpenang.com.my/en/

Sunway Medical Centre Penang is a private hospital in Seberang Perai within the Malaysian state of Penang.

== Details ==
Established in 2022, the 312-bed healthcare facility at Seberang Jaya is the third hospital opened by Malaysian conglomerate Sunway Group. Services provided by the hospital include, but not limited to, radiology, cardiology, nephrology, neurology, internal medicine, general surgery, robot-assisted surgery and arthroscopy.

Touted as a "tertiary care facility" within Seberang Perai, the hospital began construction in 2018. The first phase of the hospital was completed in 2022 at a cost of RM430 million, containing a total of 200 beds. An extension is being built which will expand the hospital's capacity to 312 beds by 2024.

== See also ==
- List of hospitals in Malaysia
