= Karumariamman Temple, Penang =

Arulmigu Karumariamman Temple
- Malay: Kuil Arulmigu Karumariamman; Tamil: அருள்மிகு கருமாரியம்மன் கோயில்
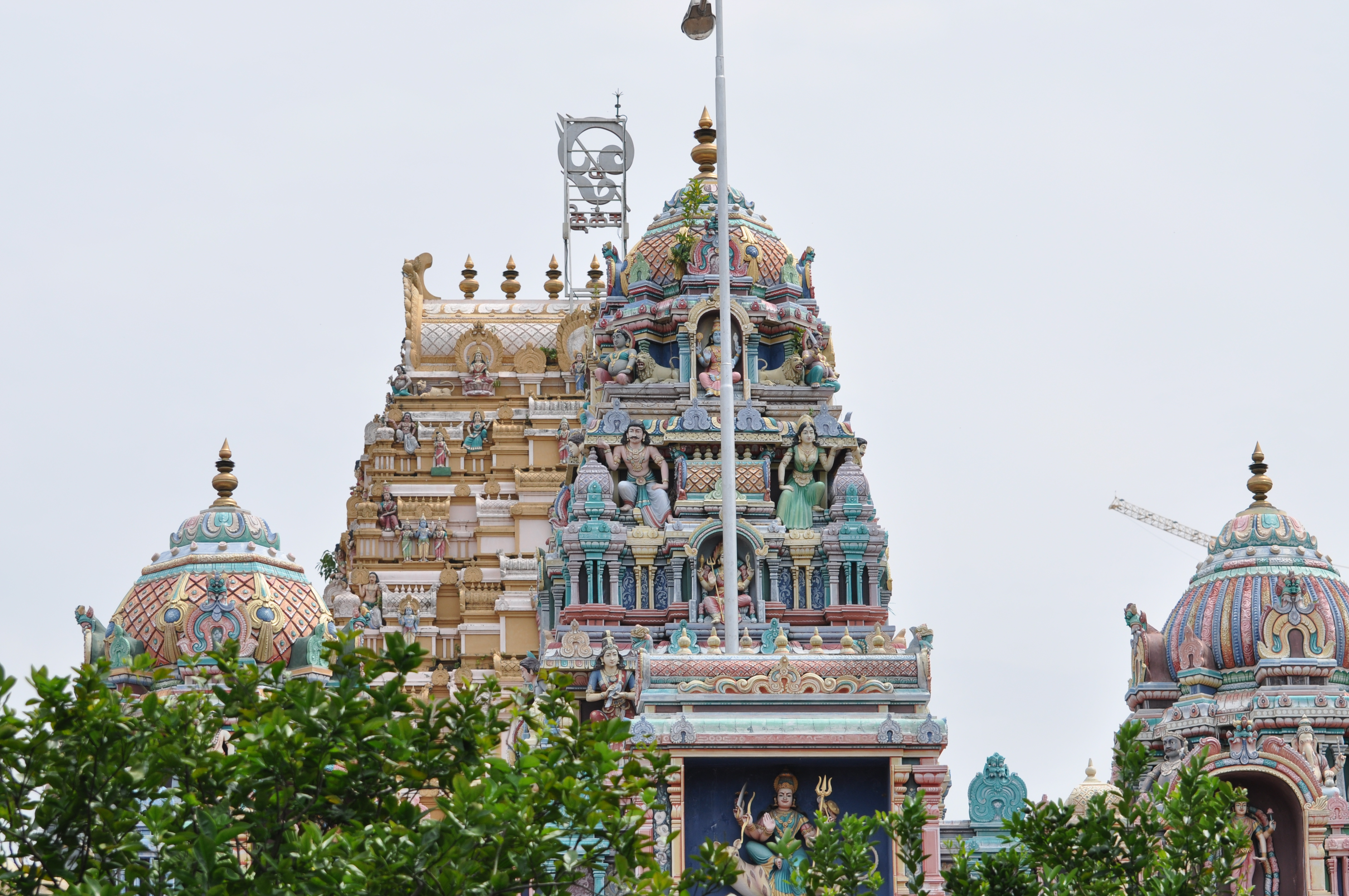
- Arulmigu Karumariamman temple.

- Location in Malaysia

Religion
- Affiliation: Hinduism
- District: Seberang Jaya
- Deity: Karumariamman

Location
- Location: Sunway
- State: Penang
- Country: Malaysia
- Coordinates: 5°23′41″N 100°23′42″E

Architecture
- Type: Dravidian architecture
- Completed: 1997

The Arulmigu Karumariamman Temple of Seberang Jaya is a South Indian Hindu temple noted for having the largest rajagopuram, or main sculpture tower, in Malaysia. It stands at a height of 72 feet (22 m). The entrance of the rajagopuram, at 21 ft (6.4 m) tall and 11 ft (3.4 m) wide, is also the biggest in Malaysia.

The Arulmigu Karumariamman Temple, as with many Hindu temples in Malaysia, had its humble origin over a hundred years ago as an estate temple catering to the needs of the estate workers living in the Paduma Estate in Perai. The area where the estate was located was turned into the new township of Seberang Jaya in the 1970s, resulting in the removal of two temples located in the area. Nevertheless, in response to the demand of the residents, the Penang State Government granted a piece of land for the building a new Hindu temple.

Work on the new temple began in 1996. Dato Seri S. Samy Velu, the Minister of Works, laid the foundation stone of the temple on 16 February 1997. The temple was completed at the cost of RM2.3 million, and dedicated to the Hindu deity Arulmigu Karumariamman, a mother deity among the rural South Indians.

The temple is known for its interfaith harmony with other religious communities in the area.

== See also ==
- List of Hindu temples in Malaysia
