= Sunway Carnival Mall =

Shopping mall in Seberang Perai, Penang, Malaysia

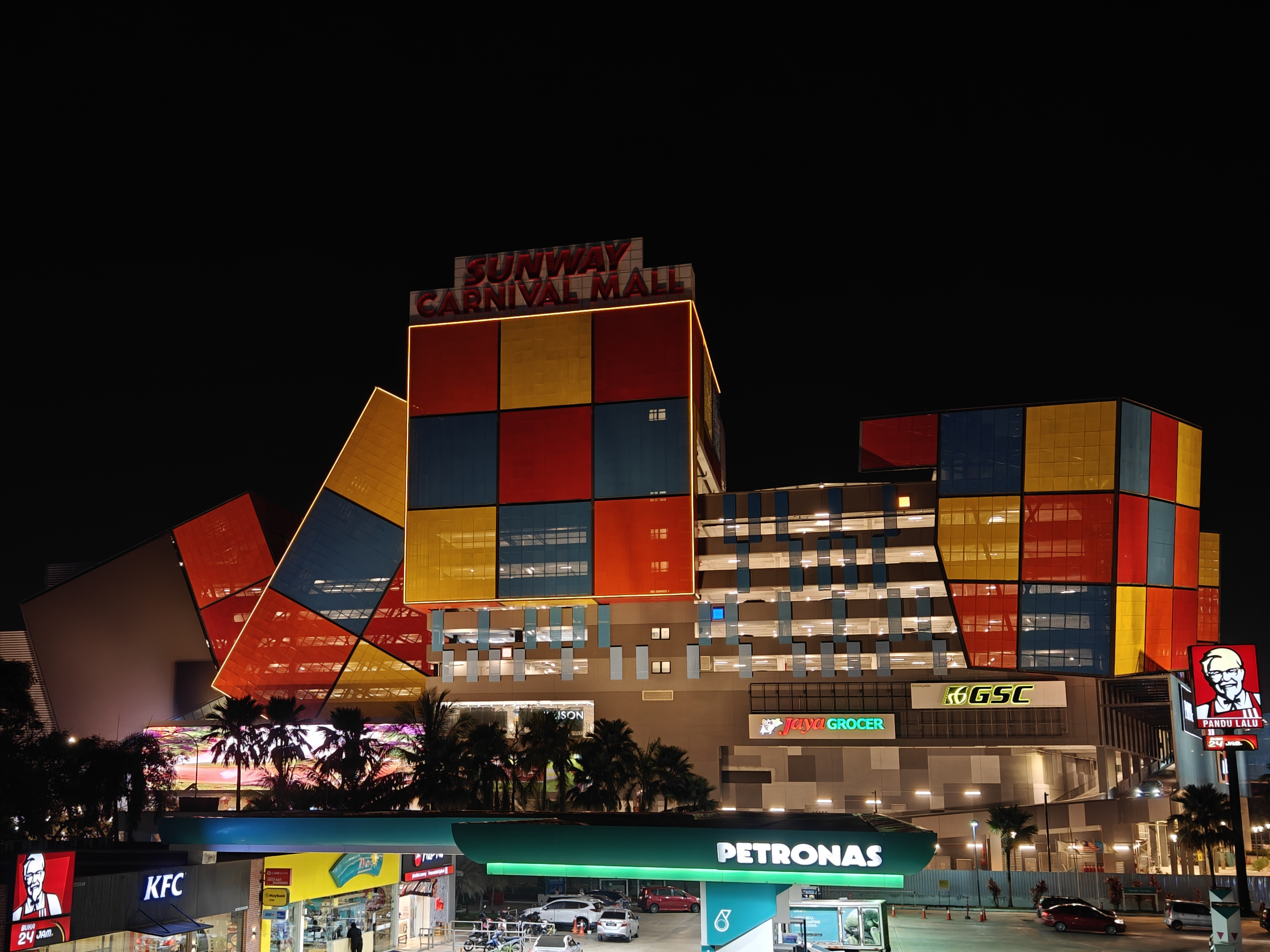
- Location: Seberang Jaya, Central Seberang Perai, Penang, Malaysia
- Coordinates: 5°23′55.6″N 100°23′53.0″E
- Opened: June 2007 (phase 1); 17 June 2022 (phase 2)
- Developer: Sunway Group
- Manager: RHB Trustees Berhad
- Owner: Sunway Group
- Num. of stores: 350+
- Num. of anchor tenants: 5 (Parkson Grand, GSC Cinemas), Jaya Grocer & Harvey Norman
- Floor area: 800,000 sq ft (74,000 m^{2})
- Floors: 4 Levels include LG, G, 1 & 2
- Parking: 3,200 Parking Bays at Zone B Level B & Zone A Level CP3, CP4, CP5, CP6, CP7 & CP8
- Website: sunwaycarnival.com

Sunway Carnival Mall is a shopping mall within Seberang Perai in the Malaysian state of Penang. Located at Seberang Jaya, the 769,546 sq ft (71,493.2 m^{2}) shopping centre was opened in 2007 and is one of the retail malls run by Malaysian conglomerate Sunway Group. A renovation and expansion process was then started in 2022. Its investment cost to date stands at RM 156 million with a gross build-up of 800,000 sq ft (74,000 m^{2}). The ongoing expansion of the mall is expected to double its gross floor area to 1,450,000 sq ft (135,000 m^{2}).

Parkson Departmental Store, GSC Cinemas, Jaya Grocer and Harvey Norman are the anchor tenants. It also contains over 350 specialty stores.

== See also ==
- Sunway City
- Sunway Pyramid

== Gallery ==
New wing main entrance

New wing interior

First Haidilao restaurant in Seberang Perai area

Second Jaya Grocer in northern Malaysia area
