= Ramon Navaratnam =

Malaysian civil servant and economist

Tan Sri Ramon Navaratnam (born January 1935) is a Malaysian economist. He is the former Secretary-General of the Malaysian Ministry of Transport, and is currently the corporate advisor of Sunway Group. He is of Sri Lankan Tamil descent.

== Biography ==
Navaratnam was a member of the Malaysian Institute of Management (MIM), the National Economic Action Council (NEAC) and the former president of Transparency International Malaysia. He is currently the Director of the Asian Strategy and Leadership Institute (ASLI) and the Chairman of the Centre for Public Policy Studies (CPPS).

He completed his secondary studies at Victoria Institution, Kuala Lumpur, and won a partial scholarship to the University of Malaya in Singapore, where he pursued a degree in Economics in 1959.

After graduation, he began working as Assistant Secretary in the Health and Social Welfare Ministry.

In 1969, he went on to earn a master's degree in Public Administration at Harvard University, Massachusetts, on a full university scholarship.

He was at the time employed in the Economic Division of the Treasury and, upon returning, rejoined it. Shortly after, he became its deputy head.

In 1971 and 1972, he was selected to represent Malaysia as alternate executive director in the World Bank in Washington DC. His post required him to travel to South-East Asian countries, where he helped to brief officials on developments in World Bank policies and the progress of their applications for loans.

Navaratnam became Deputy Secretary-General of the Ministry of Finance in 1979.

In 1985 he became the first government representative on the Kuala Lumpur Stock Exchange (now Bursa Malaysia) Executive Committee. He became Secretary-General of the Transport Ministry in 1986.

In 1989 he became a member of the National Development Planning Committee, after which he left government service to join Bank Buruh (M) Bhd as executive director and chief executive officer.

From 1994 - 1995 he was executive vice-chairman of the Asian Strategy and Leadership Institute in Kuala Lumpur. At this time, he was also appointed group corporate adviser to the Sunway Group, a post he still holds.

In 1996 he was appointed executive director of Sunway College, and from 1997 - 1998 he was a member of the Special Education Committee in the Ministry of Education. From 1999 to 2000 he was a member of the National Economic Consultative Council. In 2000 he was also awarded an Honorary Doctorate of Laws by Oxford Brookes University, Britain. He joined the National Unity Advisory Panel, of which he is still a member.

In 2002 he joined the National Economic Action Council, and in 2004 became a member of the National Higher Education Council. In 2007 he was appointed as an advisor to Enterprise Asia, an NGO based in Kuala Lumpur, Malaysia.

== Honours ==
- Malaysia
  - Commander of the Order of Loyalty to the Crown of Malaysia (PSM) – Tan Sri (1989)
  - Companion of the Order of the Defender of the Realm (JMN) (1979)
  - Officer of the Order of the Defender of the Realm (KMN) (1974)
- Selangor
  - Knight Commander of the Order of the Crown of Selangor (DPMS) – Dato' (1982)

== Books ==
Navaratnam is also an author of several books on the Malaysian economic development, as well as his memoirs:

- 1997 - Managing the Malaysian Economy (ISBN 978-9679785814).
- 1998 - Strengthening the Malaysian Economy.
- 1999 - Healing the Wounded Tiger: How the Turmoil Is Reshaping Malaysia.
- 2000 - Malaysia's Economic Recovery. Ramon
- 2002 - Malaysia's Economic Sustainability
- 2003 - Malaysia's Economic Challenges.
- 2004 - Malaysia's Socio-economic Challenges - Winds of Change
- 2005 - My Life and Times: A Memoir.
