= Sunway Pyramid =

Shopping mall in Petaling, Selangor, Malaysia

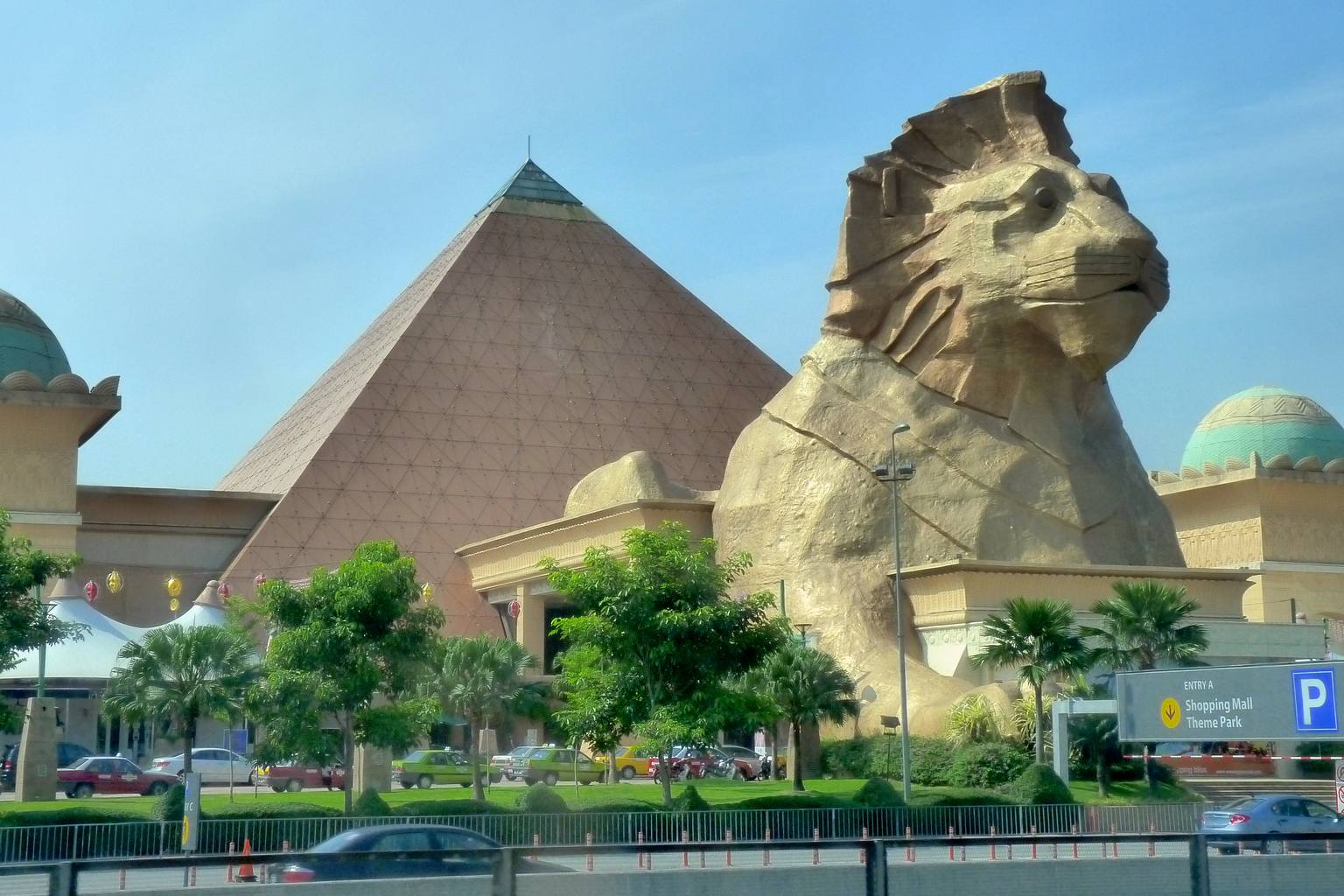
- Front facade of Sunway Pyramid shopping mall
- Location: Sunway City, Subang Jaya, Selangor, Malaysia
- Coordinates: 3°4′21″N 101°36′26″E
- Address: 3, Jalan PJS 11/15
- Opened: July 24, 1997; 29 years ago (phase 1); September 2007; 19 years ago (phase 2); February 2016; 10 years ago (phase 3); November 1, 2024; 2 years ago (Oasis)
- Developer: Sunway Group
- Num. of stores: 900+, including Jaya Grocer, Parkson, TGV Cinemas, Brands Outlet, Padini Concept Store, H&M, Uniqlo, Daiso, MUJI, Ace Hardware, Kaison, Toys R Us, POPULAR, Harvey Norman, Sunway Pyramid Ice Skating Rink, The Parenthood, Brands For Less, Sports Direct, USC
- Floor area: 402,108 m^{2} (4,328,250 sq ft)
- Floors: 5
- Parking: 10,000 car park lots (Integrated)@ B1-B3 & LG2-F Red Zone & CP2-CP7
- Public transit: SB03 Sunway Lagoon BRT Station
- Website: sunwaypyramid.com

Sunway Pyramid is a shopping mall located in Sunway City, Subang Jaya, Selangor, Malaysia which was developed by the Sunway Group.

== History ==
Sunway Pyramid was designed by the design director of Sunway, Nelson Yong. After several architects were unable to meet expectations for the building's façade, Yong assumed responsibility for the interior design and architectural concept. According to Yong, he immediately had an inspiration and sketched the iconic lion head, the pyramid and roughly how the building facade would look like after meeting with Sunway's chairman, Tan Sri Dr. Jeffrey Cheah.

The shopping mall was opened in July 1997. The mall was constructed and designed in the Egyptian Revival architectural style, with a prominent giant lion statue in the main entrance. This statue was designed to resemble the Great Sphinx of Giza with the large pyramid behind it. Initially, the face of the statue was actually intended to be a face of a man, with some resemblance to the founder and current chairman of the Sunway Group, Tan Sri Dr. Jeffrey Cheah. Once the government heard about it, they rejected the proposal citing religious conflicts between the ancient religion of Egypt and modern-day Islam. Therefore, a face of a lion was ultimately chosen instead.

In 2007, an expansion known as SP2 increased the net lettable area from 886,000 sq. ft. to 1,656,000 sq. ft. From October to December 2011, the 'Canopy Walk Extension Phase 3' project improved the northeast dining zone, now known as Oasis Boulevard East. Another expansion, SP3, was completed in 2015, adding a net lettable area of 62,000 sq. ft. This area is now known as Sunway Pyramid West and is linked to the main complex via an air-conditioned bridge.

The mall features two anchor tenants which are Parkson and Jaya Grocer. Former anchor tenants include AEON, which operated in the mall for 16 years and Cold Storage, which reportedly closed in 2019.

In 2024, a reconfigured retail space spanning 300,000 sq. ft. themed 'Oasis' opened on November 1st, 2024, replacing the previous space occupied by AEON. The space now houses several new tenants such as a LEGO store and a MUJI department store (the largest in Malaysia). The lower ground section, 'Oasis Avenue' (which replaced the former AEON supermarket) currently houses multiple dining establishments as well as the Jaya Grocer anchor tenant (the supermarket was previously located at the basement level). The area is directly linked to the shopping mall through multiple entrances, elevators, and escalators, providing seamless access.

In 2025, a second expansion spanning 30,000 sq. ft. themed 'Terrace', was officially opened in July 2025, located near the main entrance (facing the New Pantai Expressway and right next to the lion statue). The expansion reconfigures the building formerly occupied by a Celcom Blue Cube, with a redesigned interior and exterior design. However, there are no direct pedestrian links connecting this expansion to the main building, with visitors having to cross a road (Jalan PJS 11/15) to get to the Terrace from the main complex.

== Management ==
The mall is managed by Sunway REIT Management Sdn Bhd.

== Mall zones ==
- Asian Avenue
- Boulevard (formerly Oasis Boulevard East)
- Fashion Central
- Marrakesh
- Orange Zone
- Blue Zone
- Green Zone
- Red Zone
- The Link
- Oasis
- Terrace

== Mall floorplan ==
Floor Plan
Flrs.	
CP7	Multi-storey Car Park
CP6	Multi-storey Car Park
CP5	Multi-storey Car Park
CP4	Multi-storey Car Park
CP3	Multi-storey Car Park
CP2	Multi-storey Car Park
FF	Shopping Mall
GF	Shopping Mall
LG1	Shopping Mall
LG2	Shopping Mall
B1	Basement Car Park
B2	Basement Car Park
B3	Basement Car Park

== Access ==
=== Rail ===
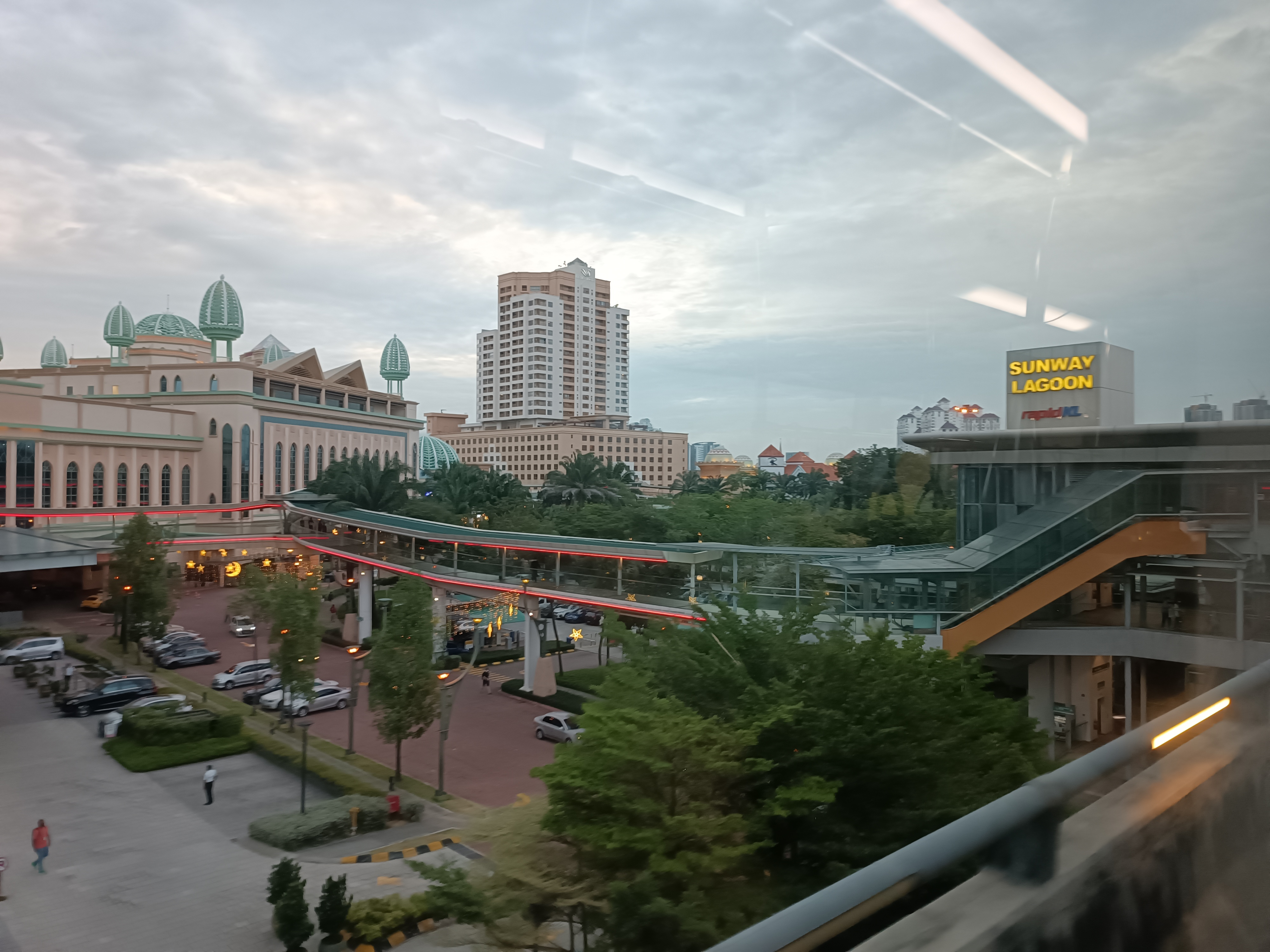
Sunway Lagoon Pedestrian Walkway that connect the BRT station to Sunway Pyramid Mall, Sunway Pyramid Hotel, Sunway Lagoon and Sunway Resort.

The mall is connected to the Sunway Lagoon BRT station by a pedestrian bridge.

The mall and its surrounding areas were previously served by Sunway Monorail, which operated between the year 2000 until 2007.

=== Car ===
In 2007, a dedicated ramp from New Pantai Expressway to the mall's car park was constructed and is located in front of the mall. The intersection of the Kuala Lumpur–Port Klang highway Federal Route 2 and Damansara–Puchong Expressway lies nearby to the mall, along with an interchange with Shah Alam Expressway. The parking lot can accommodate 10,000 cars. The parking lot uses a ticketless and cashless parking system.

=== Walkways ===
In 2014, parts of the Sunway Monorail were modified into an extensive elevated walkway network with shade, now known as Canopy Walk. The Canopy Walk links the mall directly to most nearby landmarks, thus eliminating the need for pedestrians to cross the road or drive to get to places in the city. The western section of the Canopy Walk links the mall to Sunway University, Sunway Lagoon and Monash University Malaysia, as well as the SunU-Monash BRT station located in front of the university. Whereas the eastern section of the Canopy Walk, also known as the Eco Walk, links the mall to Sunway Pinnacle, Menara Sunway, Sunway Medical Centre and Sunway Geo Avenue, as well as the SunMed BRT station, which is also connected to Taylor's University via an additional 800-meter walkway completed in 2015.

In 2025, the southern section of the Canopy Walk (from Sunway University to Monash University) was upgraded, further connecting it to Sunway Square, a new project located in the Sunway South Quay, which includes several retail floors, two corporate towers, a bookstore and a performing arts venue as well as an extension of Sunway University. The Canopy Walk section from Sunway University to Sunway Square was upgraded with a new enclosed design and air-conditioning, making it wider and noticeably different as compared to the other sections of the walkway.

The mall is also directly accessible from Sunway Pyramid Hotel and Sunway Resort Hotel via The Link, a retail and dining zone completed in 2022 which contains esteemed restaurant franchises such as Din Tai Fung and Haidilao Hot Pot (which replaced the area formerly occupied by Taste Enclave, a food court). The Link is also connected to the Sunway Lagoon Surf Beach entrance via a flight of escalators.

== Gallery ==
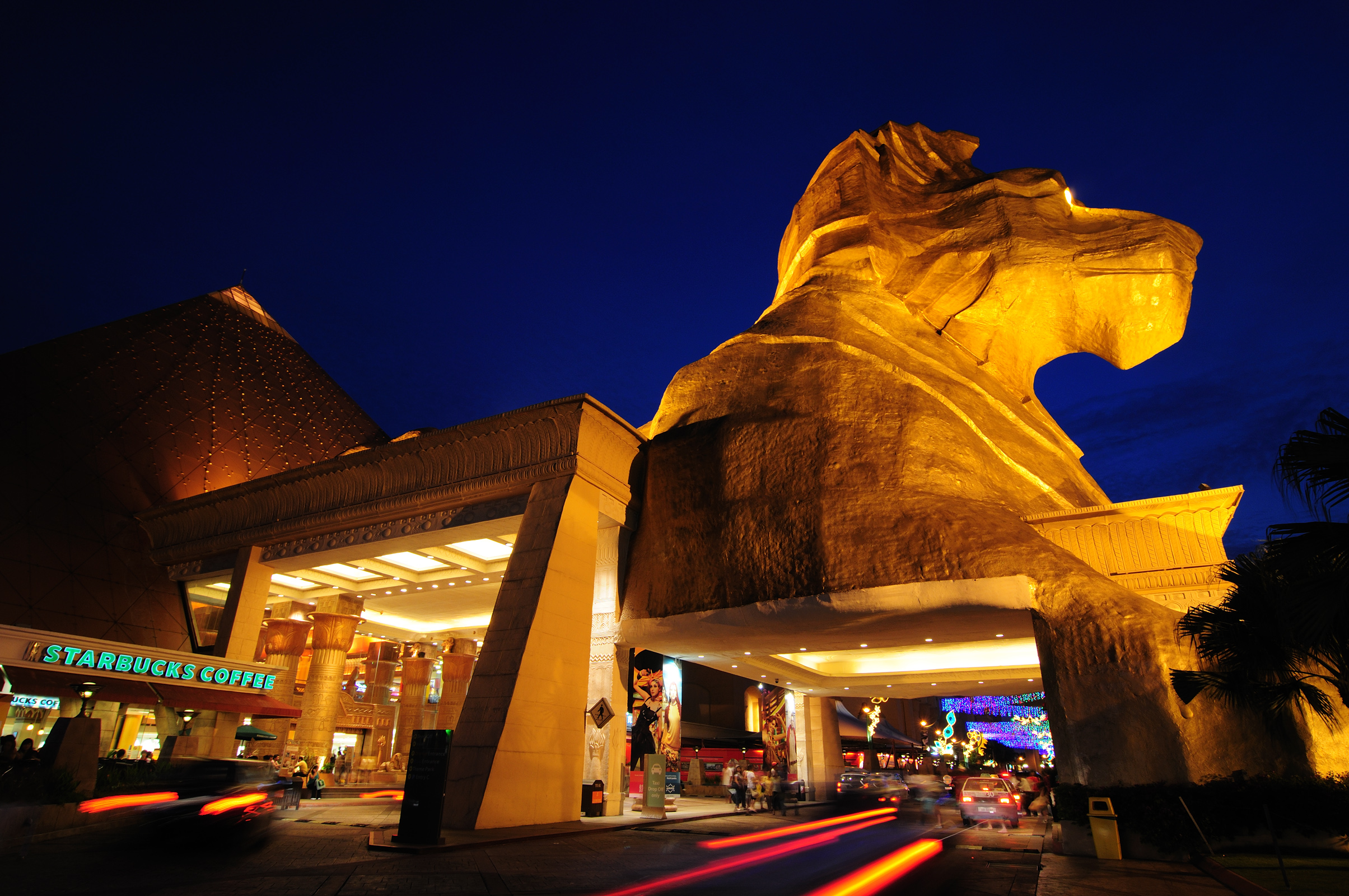
Sunway Pyramid Main Facade

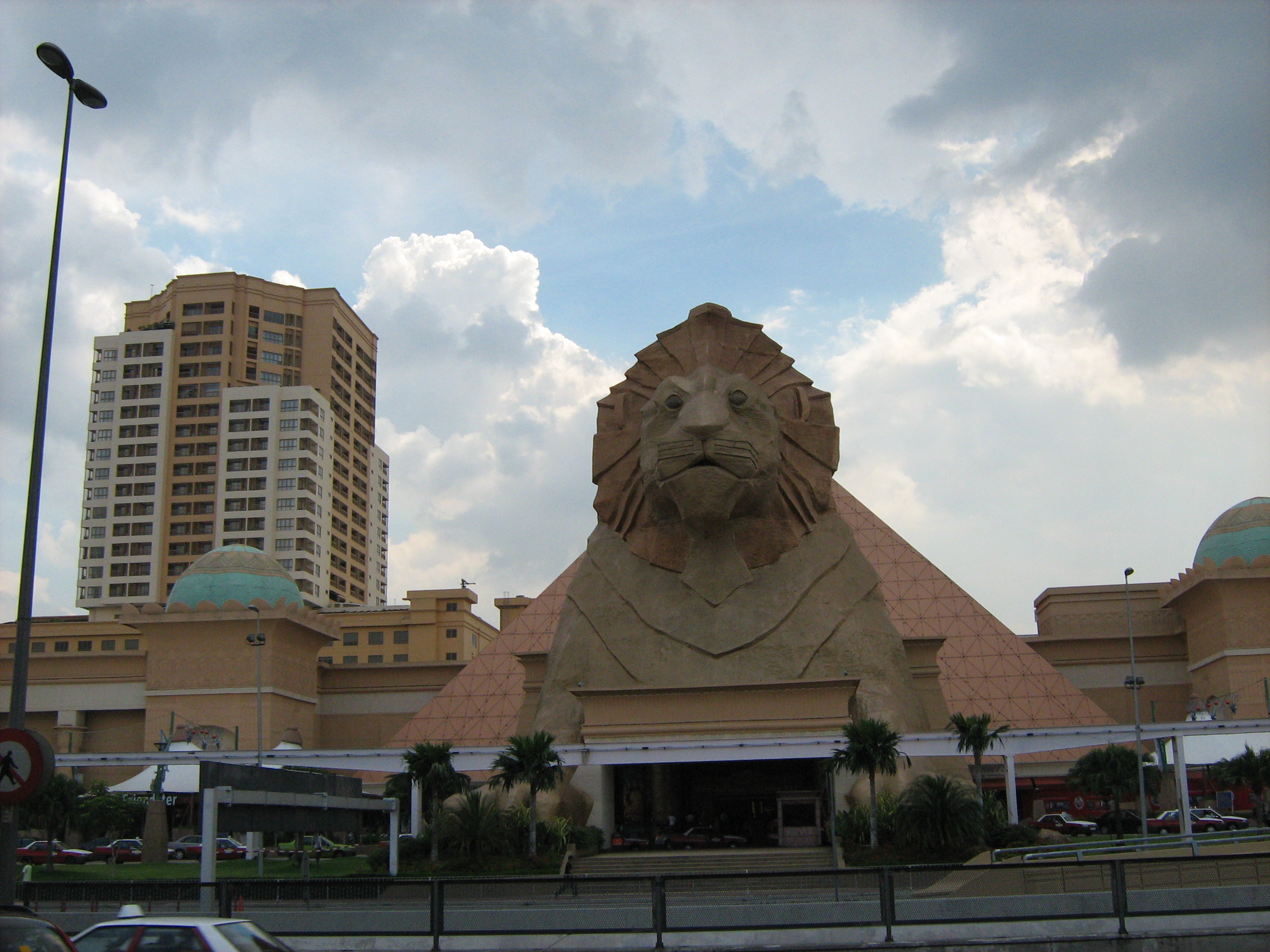
Sunway Pyramid Lion Head Entrance

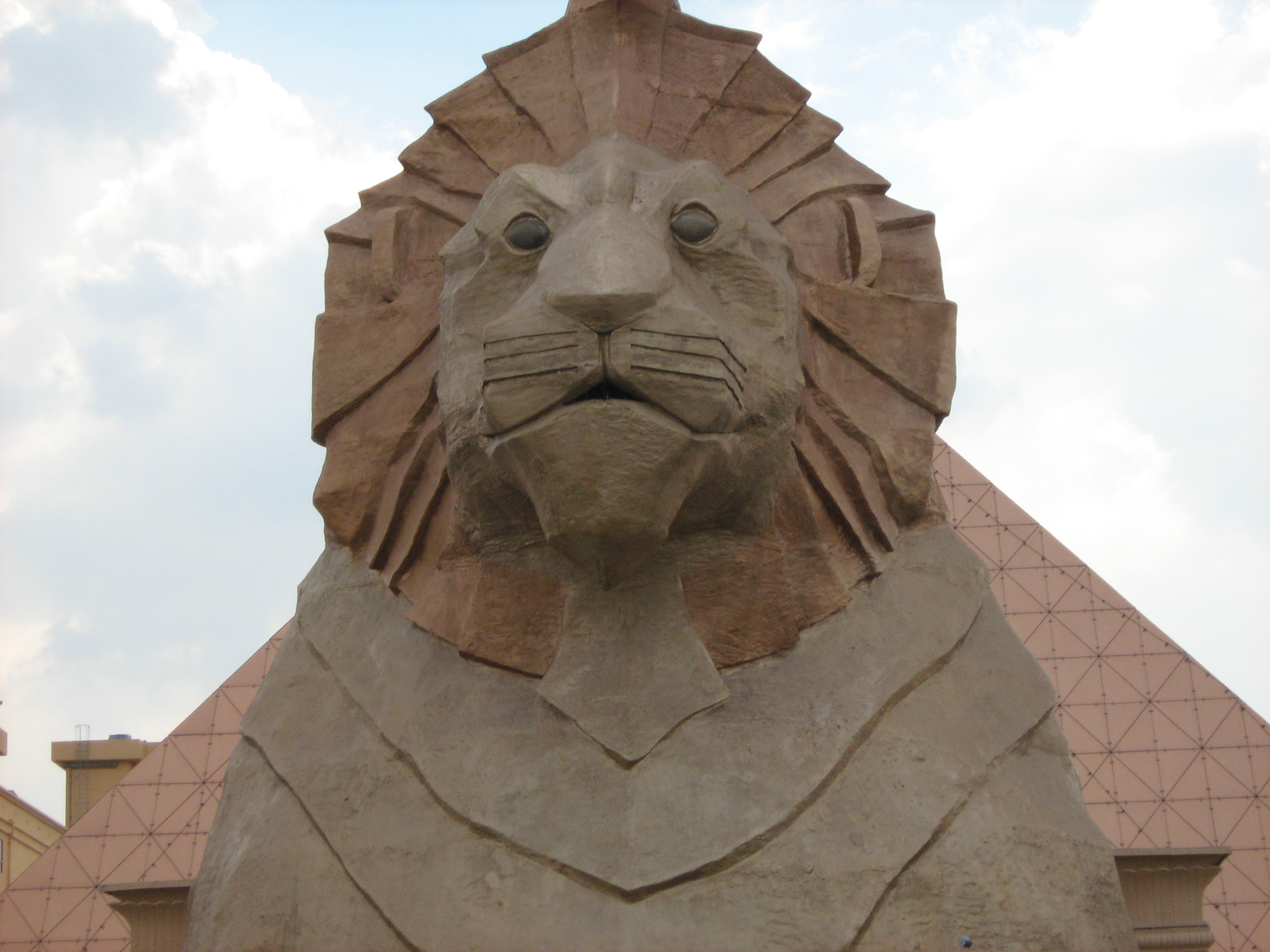
Sunway Pyramid Lion Head

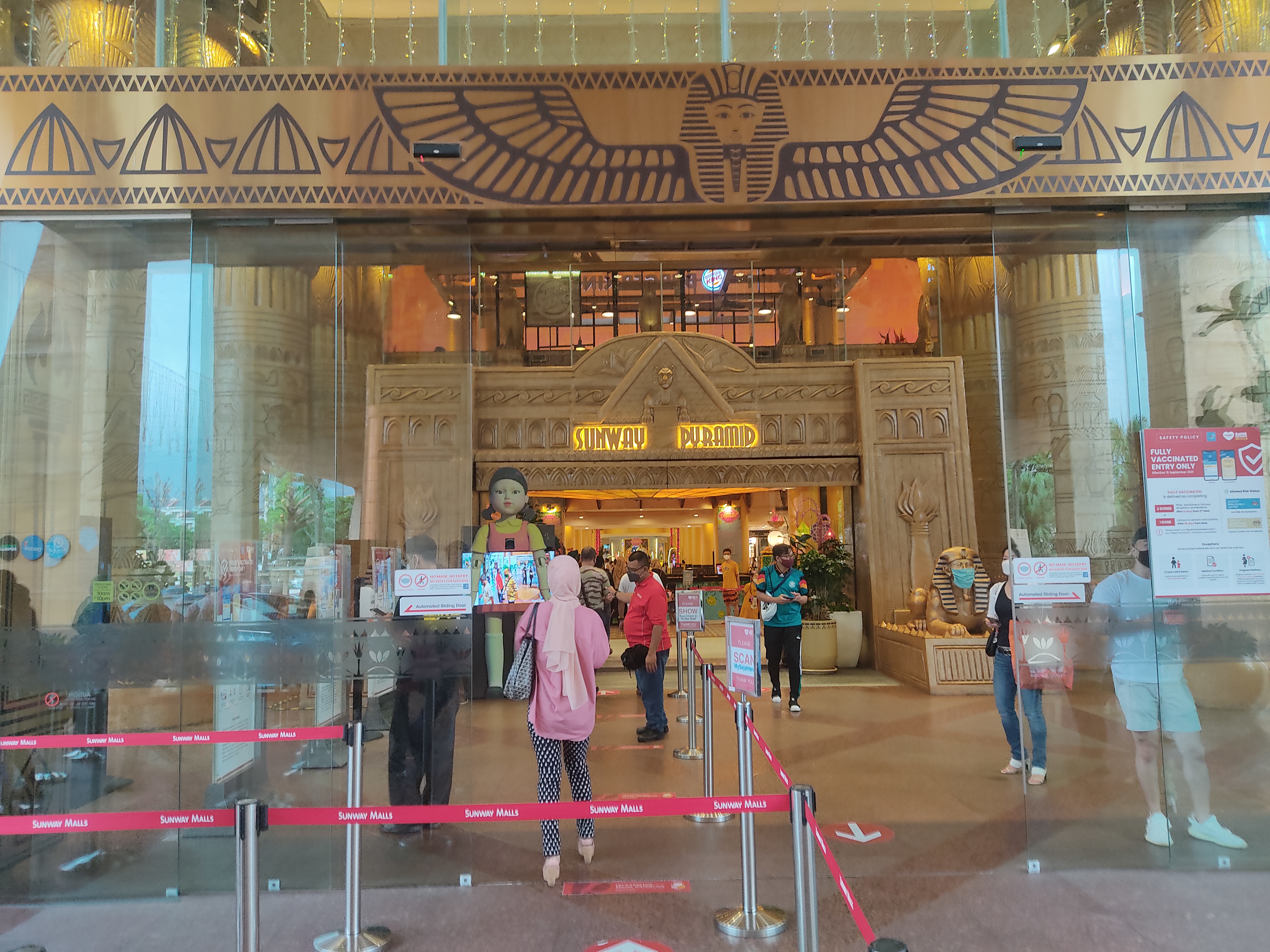
Sunway Pyramid Main Entrance

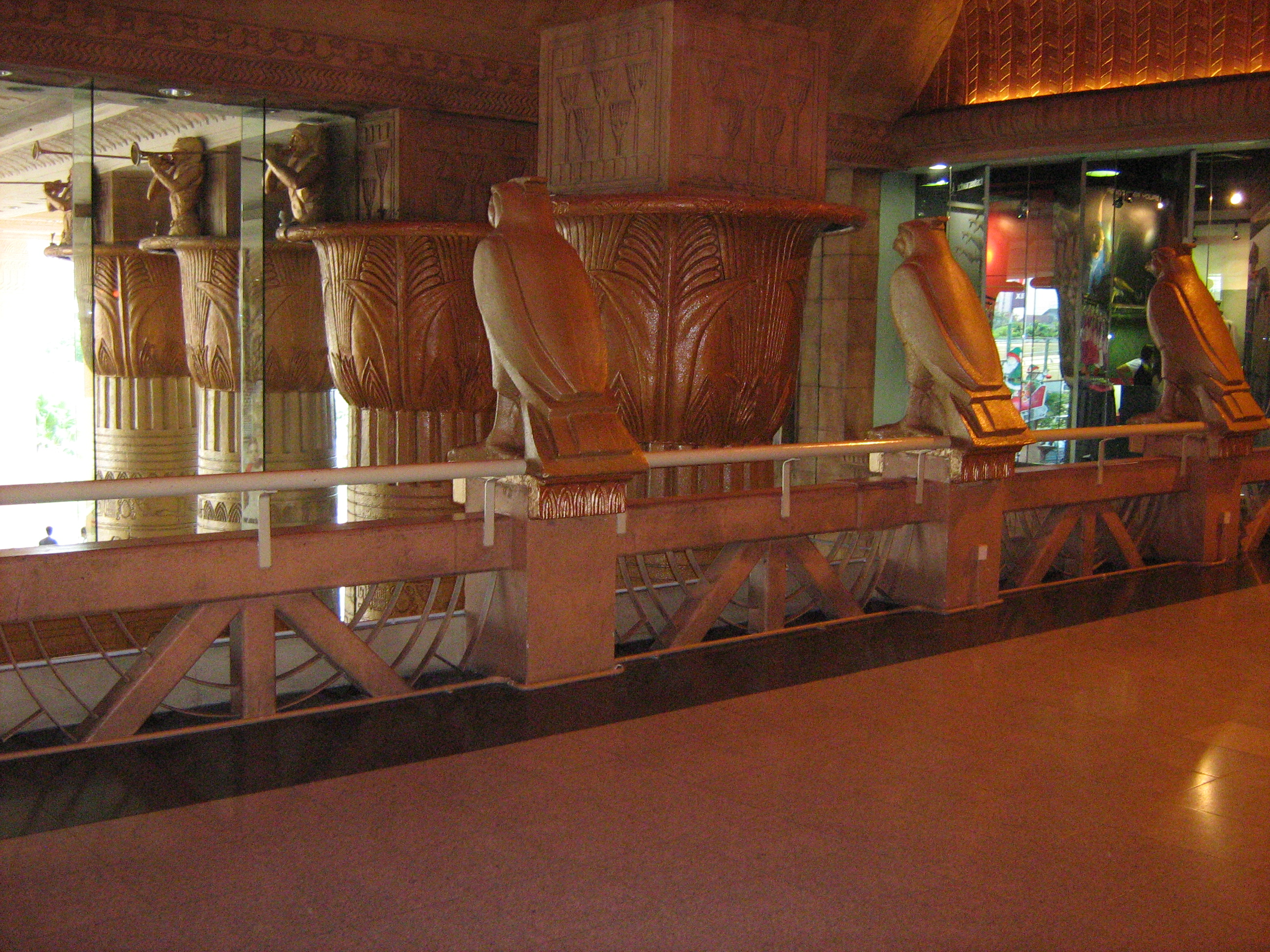
Sunway Pyramid Egyptian Decor

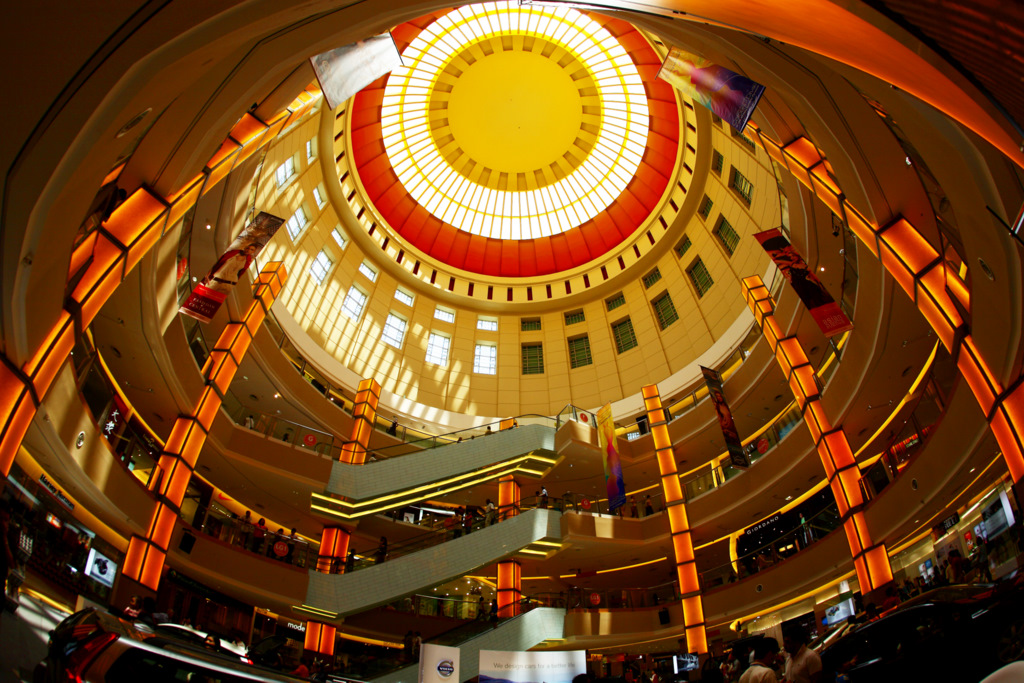
Sunway Pyramid Orange Atrium

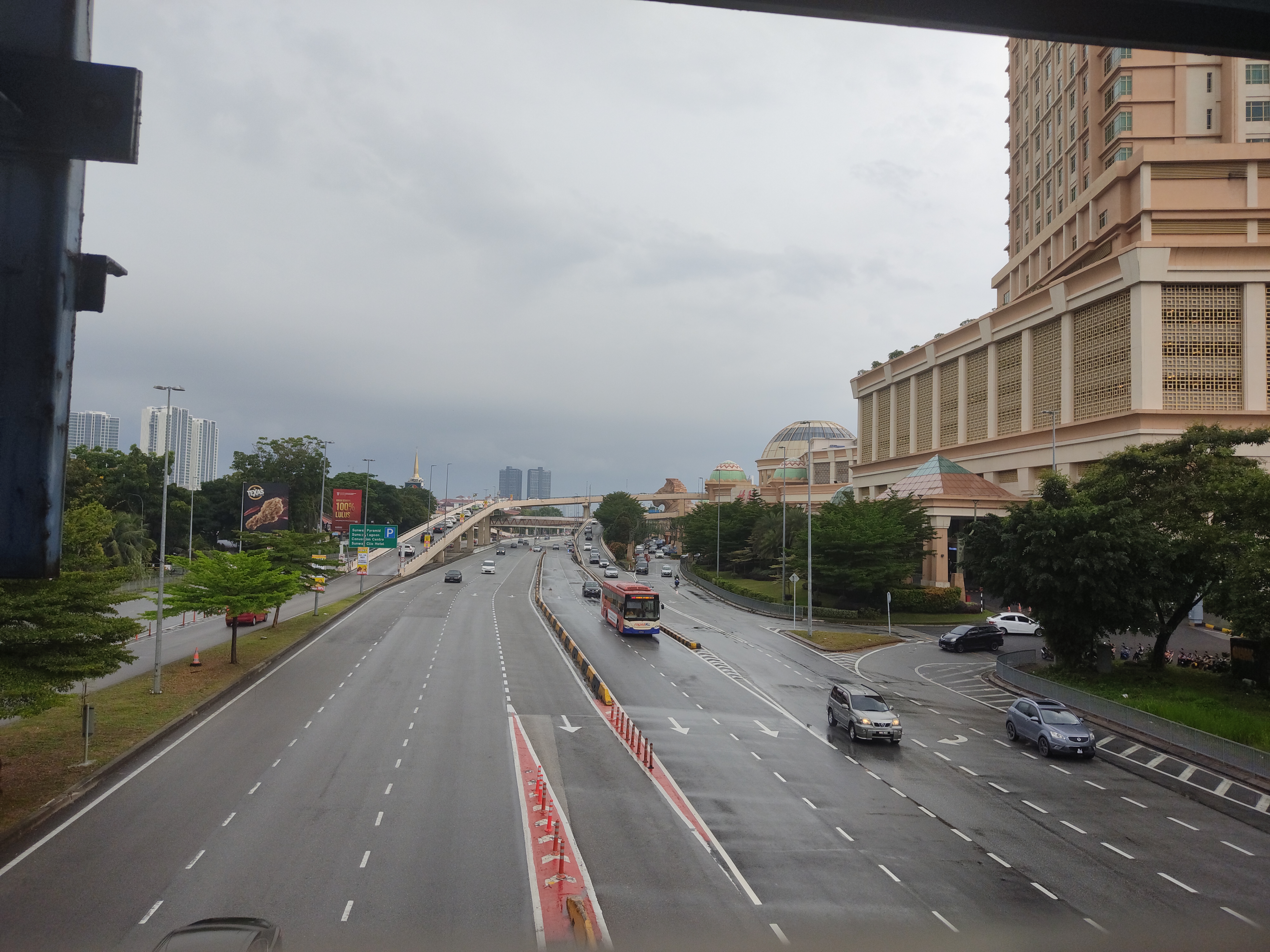
Ramp to Sunway Pyramid mall

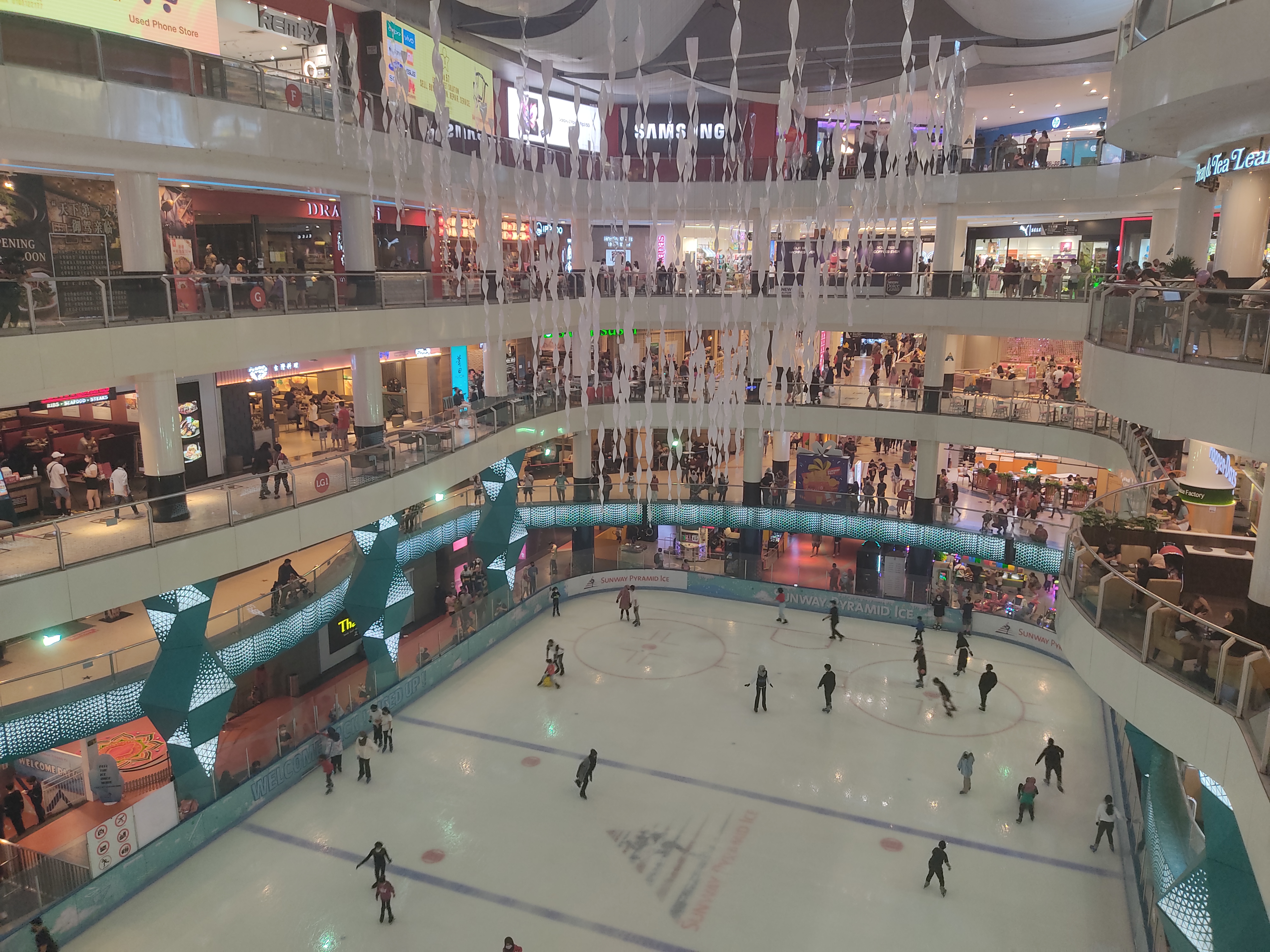
Sunway Pyramid Ice-Skating Rink

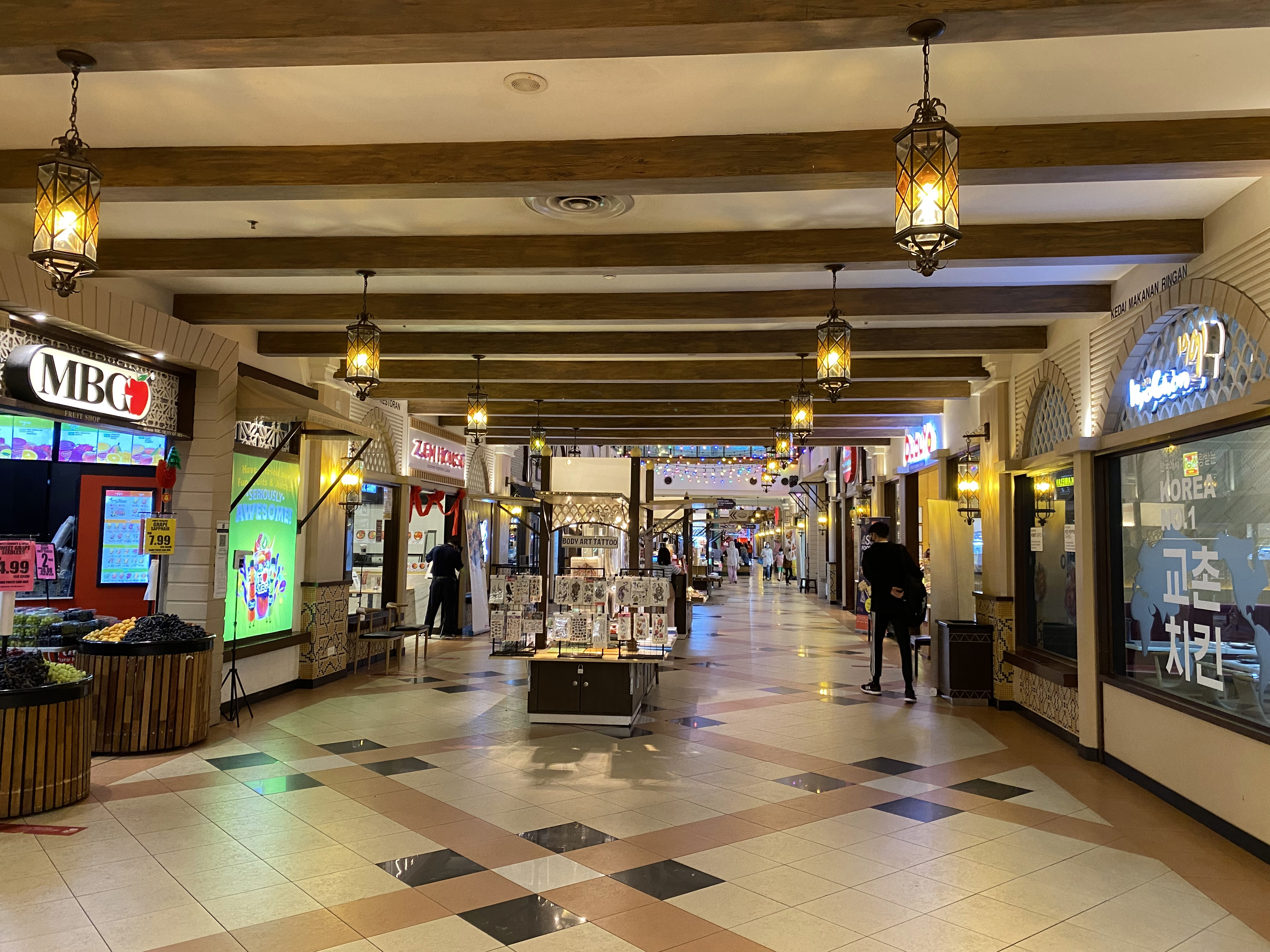
Sunway Pyramid LG2 Marrakesh Street

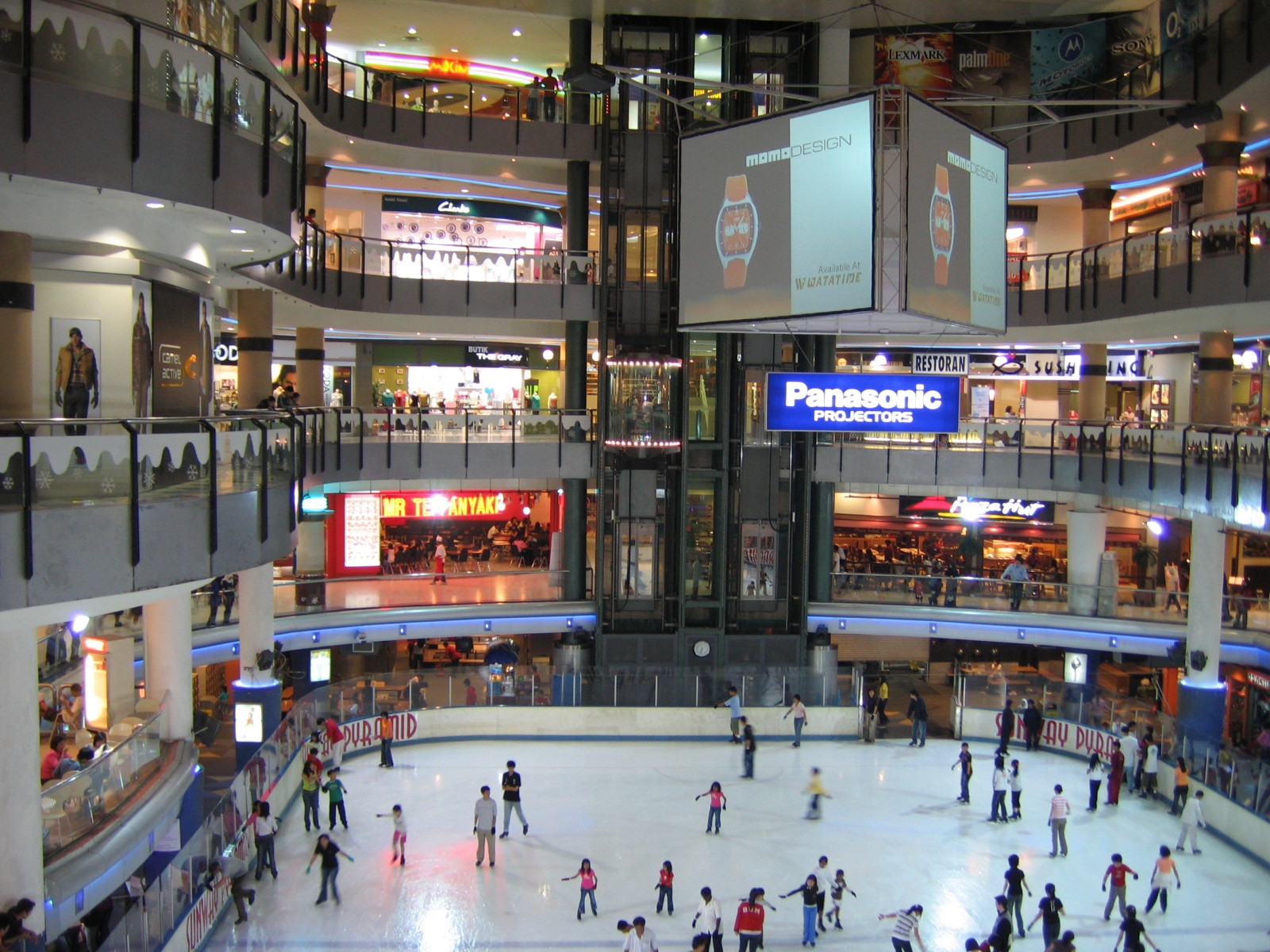
The ice-skating rink in 2005

The Link

Sunway Pyramid indoors water display

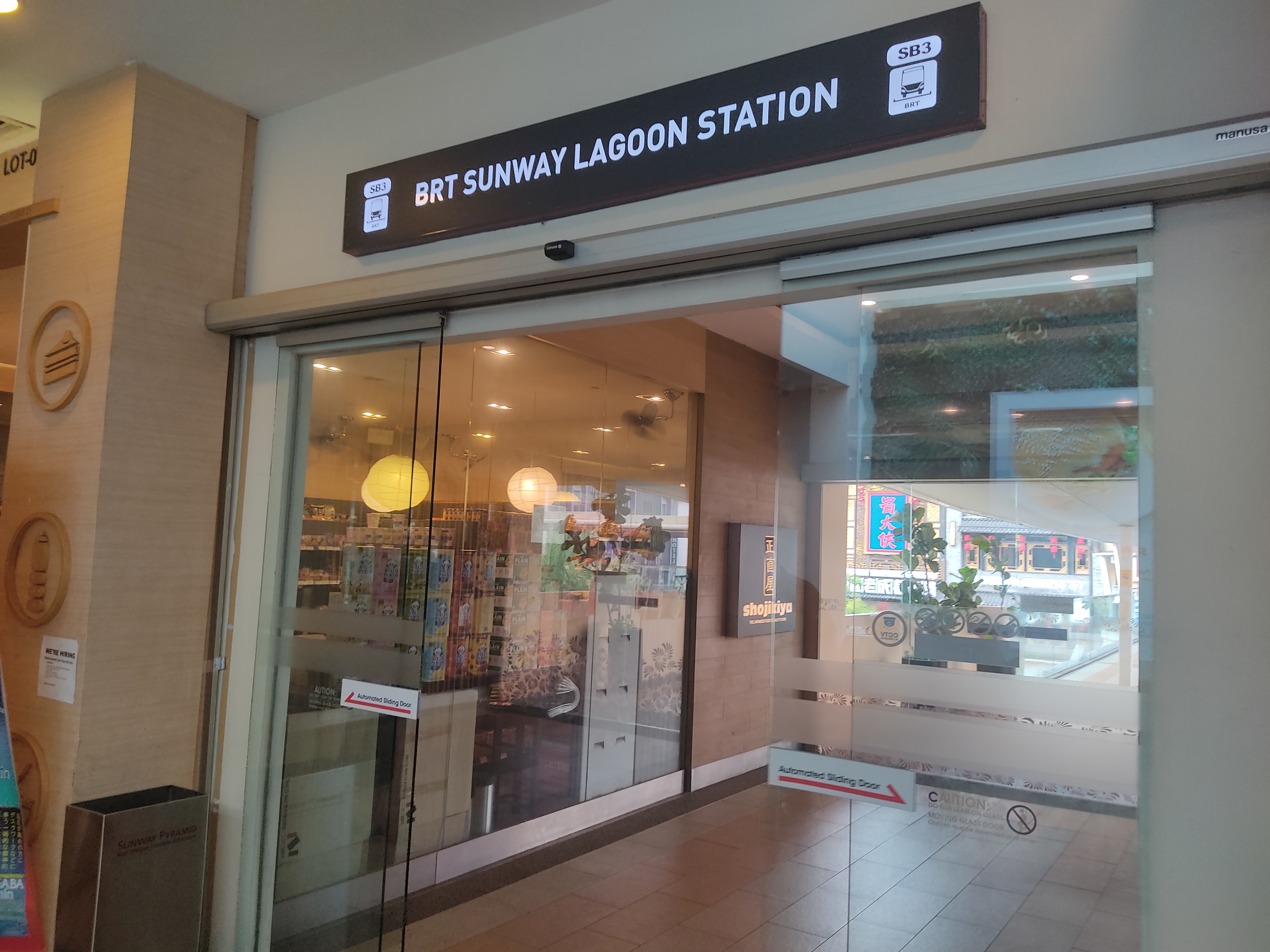
The walkway from the mall to the BRT station

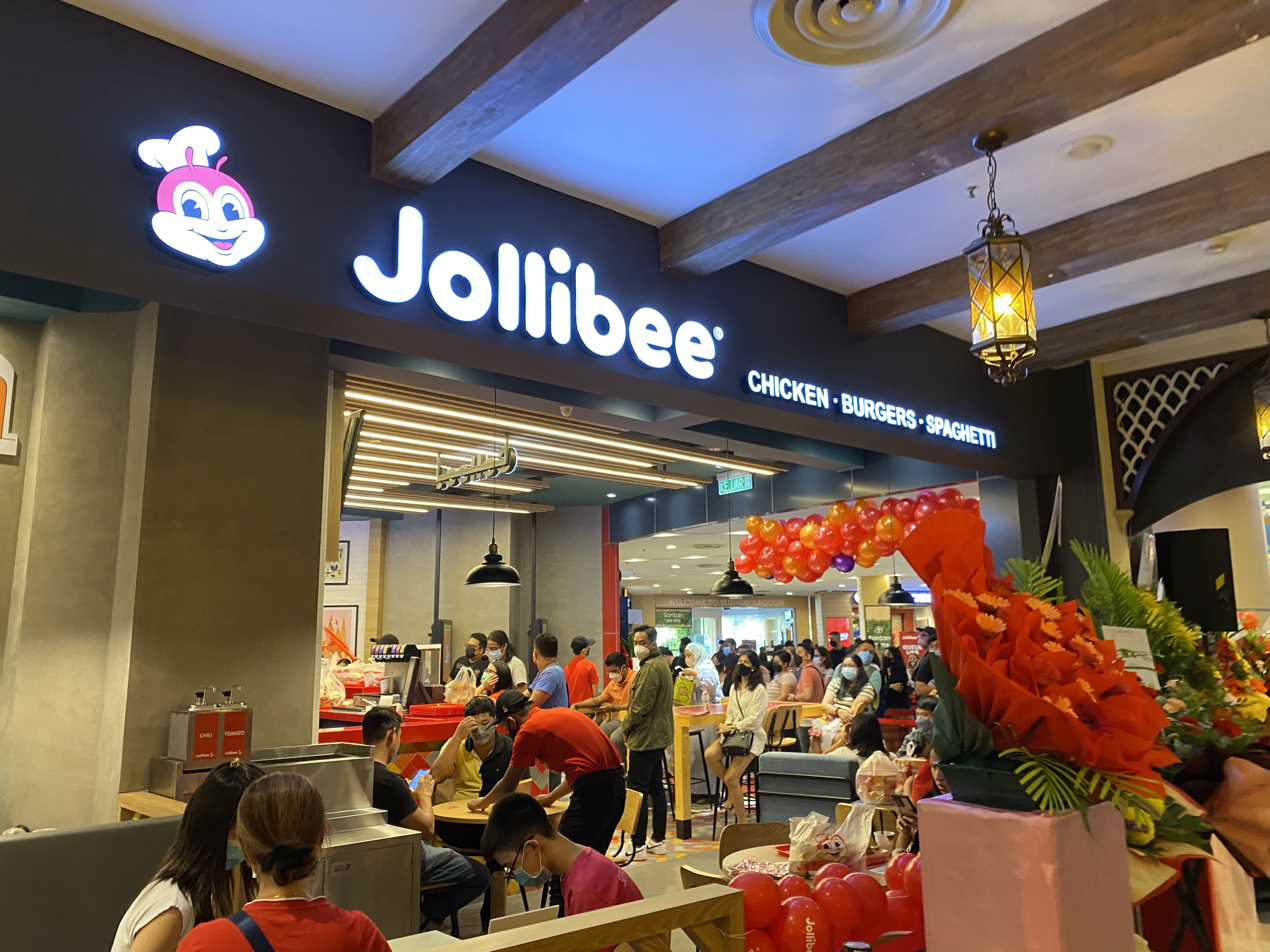
Jollibee branch in Sunway Pyramid

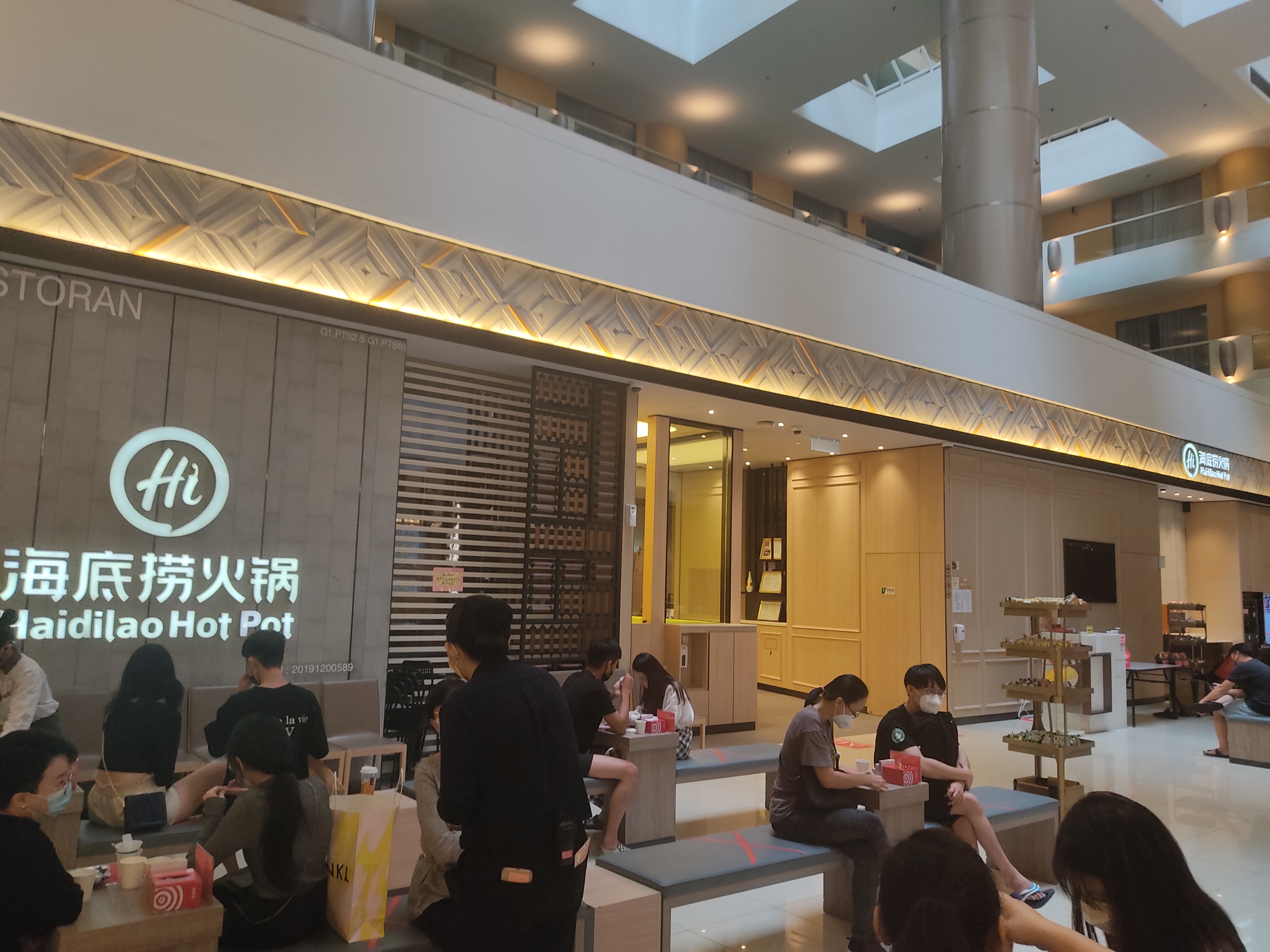
Haidilao Hot Pot branch in Sunway Pyramid. This area was formerly occupied by a food court (Taste Enclave)

== See also ==
- Egyptian Revival
- Sunway University
- Sunway Lagoon
