= Seberang Jaya National Secondary School =

- Sekolah Menengah Kebangsaan Seberang Jaya

Location
- Lengkok Sembilang, 13700; Seberang Jaya, Penang, Malaysia

Information
- Type: Public School, Secondary School, High School, (National Schools)
- Motto: Berilmu, Bermoral (Knowledgeable, Morally)
- Founded: 4 December 1989
- Principal: Tuan Hazani bin Ibrahim
- Staff: 88 (as of 2009)
- Faculty: Science, Accounting, ICT, Arts and MPV
- Forms: Pre-form 1, 1, 2, 3, 4, 5, 6
- Campus: Suburban
- Colours: Red, Blue, Green and Yellow
- Exams: PT3, SPM, STPM, MUET

Seberang Jaya National Secondary School (Malay: Sekolah Menengah Kebangsaan Seberang Jaya) is a secondary school in Seberang Jaya, Penang, Malaysia.

== History ==
Seberang Jaya National Secondary School was established on 4 December 1989 with 263 students.
