= Perai Free Industrial Zone =

Industrial zone in Seberang Perai, Penang, Malaysia

Perai Free Industrial Zone Zon Perindustrian Bebas Perai
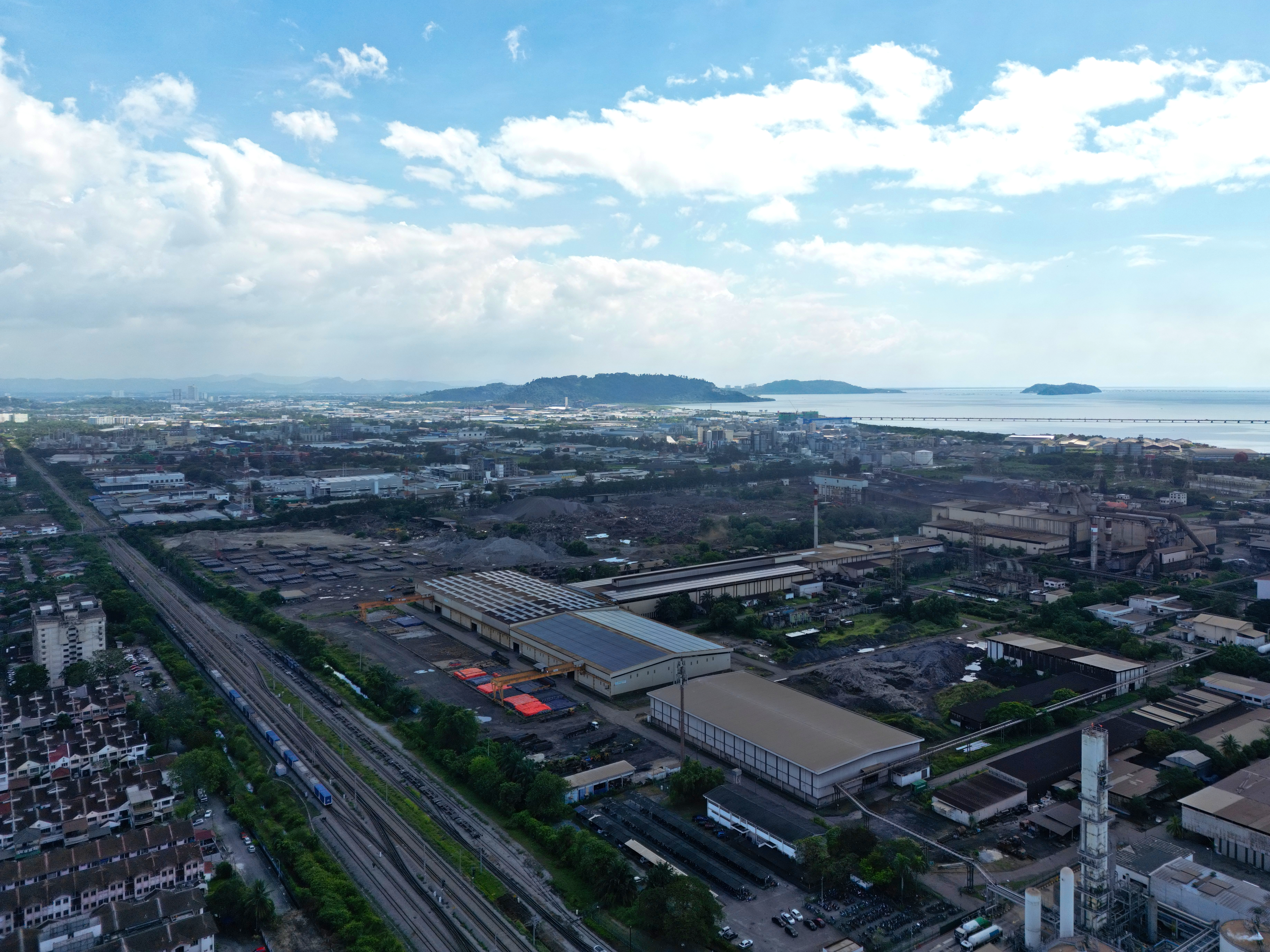

- Location within Seberang Perai in Penang
- Coordinates: 5°21′52.3686″N 100°23′46.4166″E
- Country: Malaysia
- State: Penang
- City: Seberang Perai
- Establishment: 1980

Government
  - Local government: Seberang Perai City Council

Area
  - Total: 202.69 ha (500.85 acres)
- Time zone: UTC+8 (MST)
  - Summer (DST): Not observed
- Postal code: 13600
- Area code(s): +6043, +6045

The Perai Free Industrial Zone (Perai FIZ) is a free trade zone within Seberang Perai in the Malaysian state of Penang. Located within the suburb of Perai and 4.7 km (2.9 mi) south of Butterworth, the Perai FIZ was established in 1980 with the aim of becoming a major manufacturing hub for bulk items, leveraging its proximity to the Port of Penang and the railway line that links it to the rest of western Peninsular Malaysia.

The zone has since attracted numerous multinational companies such as Mattel, Flex, Sanmina, JinkoSolar and Honeywell. In 2022, the Perai FIZ, along with other industrial estates within Central Seberang Perai, received RM1.05 billion of foreign direct investments (FDI), accounting for nearly 11% of Penang's total FDI that year.

== See also ==
- Bayan Lepas Free Industrial Zone
