= Sunway Group =

Malaysian conglomerate

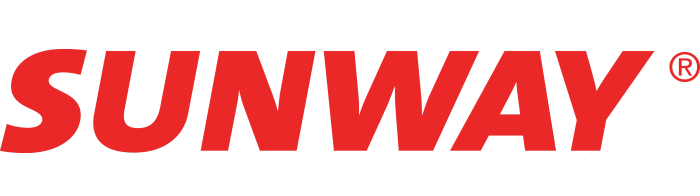
- Native name: Sunway Berhad 双威集团
- Type: Public
- Traded as: MYX: 5211
- ISIN: MYL5211OO007
- Industry: Conglomerate
- Founded: 1974; 52 years ago
- Founder: Jeffrey Cheah
- Headquarters: Sunway Tower, Sunway City, Subang Jaya, Selangor, Malaysia
- Key people: Jeffrey Cheah, Founder & chairman Idris Jala, Co-chairman; Sarena Cheah, Executive deputy chairman Chee Kin Chew, President; Evan Cheah, Deputy president Anuar Taib, Deputy president Ramon Navaratnam, Corporate advisor
- Revenue: 5.41 billion MYR 2018 (▲6.2%)
- Number of employees: 16,000+
- Website: sunway.com.my

Sunway Group (Malay: Sunway Berhad, Chinese: 双威集团) is a Malaysian conglomerate. It is headquartered at Sunway City, Subang Jaya, Selangor, Malaysia.

== History ==
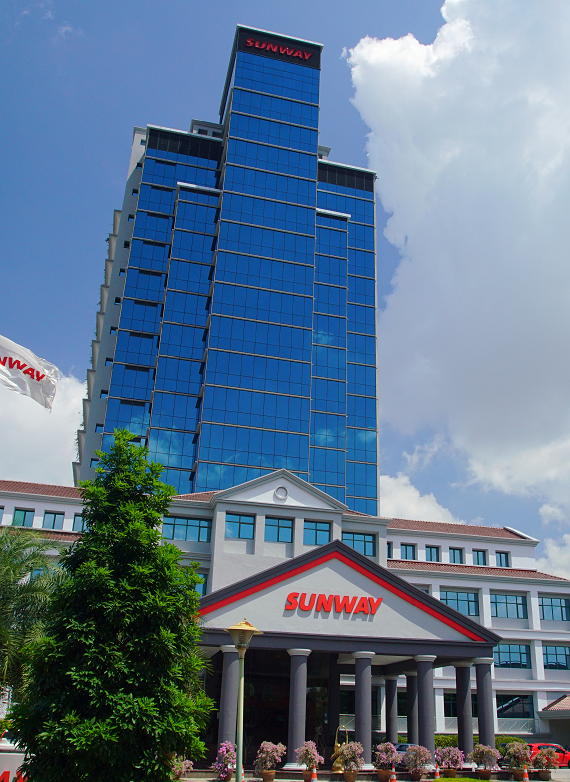
Sunway Group headquarters at Sunway Tower (Menara Sunway) in Sunway City, Subang Jaya, Selangor

The Sunway Group commenced operations in 1974, primarily focused on the development of Bandar Sunway township in Petaling Jaya. It was listed on Bursa Malaysia Securities Bandar on 16 February 1984. Sunway City Berhad was incorporated in 1982 and engages in the “investment and development of residential, commercial, retail, leisure, and healthcare properties primarily in Asia". Sunway's core businesses are property development and construction.

In January 2026, Sunway launched a roughly RM11 billion (US$2.7 billion) conditional takeover offer for IJM Corporation in a cash-and-stock deal, mostly payable in new Sunway shares. The IJM board, advised by an independent adviser, urged shareholders to reject the bid citing that it undervalued the company.

The takeover offer lapsed on 6 April 2026 after Sunway secured acceptances of only 33.43% of IJM shares by the closing date, falling short of the over 50% threshold required. Maybank Investment Bank, the offer manager, confirmed the offer had lapsed and that all acceptances would be returned to shareholders. Sunway had stated from the outset that it would not revise its offer terms, describing the proposal as its best and final offer. In response to the outcome, IJM's chief executive officer Datuk Lee Chun Fai said the company would continue executing its strategy to deliver value across its core businesses.

In a separate development, Sunway listed its healthcare arm, Sunway Healthcare Holdings Bhd (SUNMED), on the Main Market of Bursa Malaysia on 18 March 2026 at an IPO price of RM1.45 per share, raising RM2.86 billion — Malaysia's largest IPO in nine years since Lotte Chemical Titan in 2017. Shares surged approximately 28% on debut, valuing the company at around RM16.68 billion. Sunway retained a 69.5% equity interest in Sunway Healthcare following the listing.

== Subsidiaries ==
Sunway's most notable subsidiaries are located close to headquarters. These include two hotels: Sunway Resort Hotel and Spa and the Pyramid Tower Hotel. Other tourism-related facilities include the Sunway Pyramid shopping mall and Sunway Lagoon theme park.

Sunway Education Group comprises eight educational institutions: Sunway University, 42 Kuala Lumpur, Sunway Le Cordon Bleu Institute of Culinary Arts, Sunway College, Sunway International School, and Sunway International School Sunway Iskandar. Sunway Group is the part owner of the Campus.

Sunway Property is the property development arm. It was established in 1974 and became a multinational property development and construction corporation, with presence in over 50 locations worldwide. Their businesses operate in countries such as Malaysia, China, Singapore, Cambodia and Vietnam. Sunway Property is the master developer of Sunway City, Sunway City Ipoh, Sunway Penang and Sunway Iskandar.

=== Other operations ===
- Sunway Pyramid
- Sunway Putra Mall
- Sunway Velocity
- Sunway Carnival Mall
- Sunway City Ipoh
- Sunway City Iskandar Puteri
- Sunway City Kuala Lumpur
- Sunway College
- Sunway University
- Sunway Lagoon
- Sunway Lost World Of Tambun, Ipoh
- Sunway Medical Centre Penang
- Sunway Ipoh Mall
- Sunway Medical Centre Ipoh
- Sunway 163 Mall
- Sunway Square Mall
- Sunway Multicare Pharmacy
