= Jaya Grocer =

Malaysian upscale supermarket chain

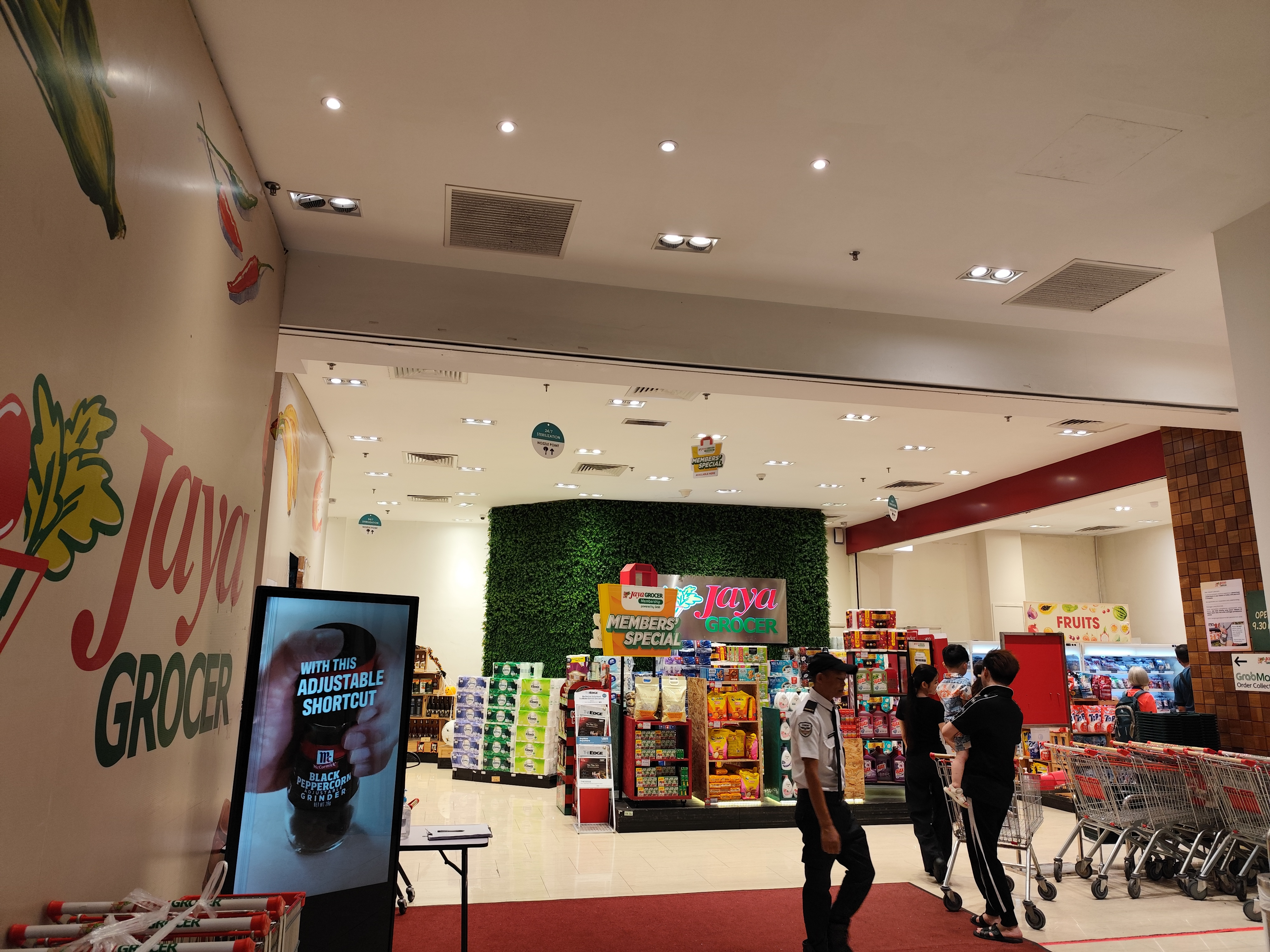
- A Jaya Grocer store located at R&F Mall in Johor Bahru.
- Type: Subsidiary
- Industry: Retail
- Founded: 2007; 19 years ago
- Founder: Teng family
- Headquarters: Petaling Jaya, Selangor, Malaysia
- Number of locations: 40 (2021)
- Area served: Peninsular Malaysia
- Products: Grocery stores, supermarkets and hypermarkets
- Revenue: RM1.34 billion (2020)
- Net income: RM68.65 million (2020)
- Parent: Grab
- Website: jayagrocer.com

Jaya Grocer is a Malaysian upscale supermarket chain. As of 2024, it operates 50 stores in Peninsular Malaysia. In 2021, Grab purchased the company.

== History ==
The Jaya Grocer supermarket chain was founded in 2007 by the Teng family, aiming to establish a premium supermarket brand. The family previously founded the Teng Minimarket Centre in Bangsar and the Giant supermarket chain before selling both retailers to Hong Kong–based DFI Retail Group. AIGF Advisors, a private equity investor, acquired a 45% stake in Jaya Grocer in 2016 after investing RM300 million in the chain in 2016. Teng Yew Huat owned the remaining 55% of the company. The Teng family bought back AIGF's stake in 2021.

=== Acquisition by Grab ===
In December 2021, Jaya Grocer became a subsidiary of Grab, a Singaporean technology company, following its acquisition of the supermarket chain from the Teng family seventeen days after the family's buyback of AIGF's stake. Grab CEO and co-founder Anthony Tan said that the acquisition would allow the company to deliver on-demand groceries to customers faster. Victor Chua, managing partner of Kuala Lumpur–based venture capital firm Vynn Capital, described the Grab acquisition as a "strategic move" by allowing Grab to strengthen its supply chain and expand its business to encompass offline operations.

In September 2025, Jaya Grocer announced its investment of RM100 million for its a new 250,000 square feet advanced warehouse facility in Petaling Jaya, Selangor. The new facility would be the first automated warehouse for grocery retail sector in Malaysia, which is envisaged to transform its supply chain efficiency create higher-skilled technology-driven roles. Features would include Automated Storage and Retrieval Systems (ASRS), robotic shuttles, conveyors, and sort systems, that is expected to automate more than 80% of the facility's storage operations.

== See also ==
- List of hypermarkets in Malaysia
- List of companies in Malaysia
