= Alma, Penang =

Alma
- Suburb of Seberang Perai
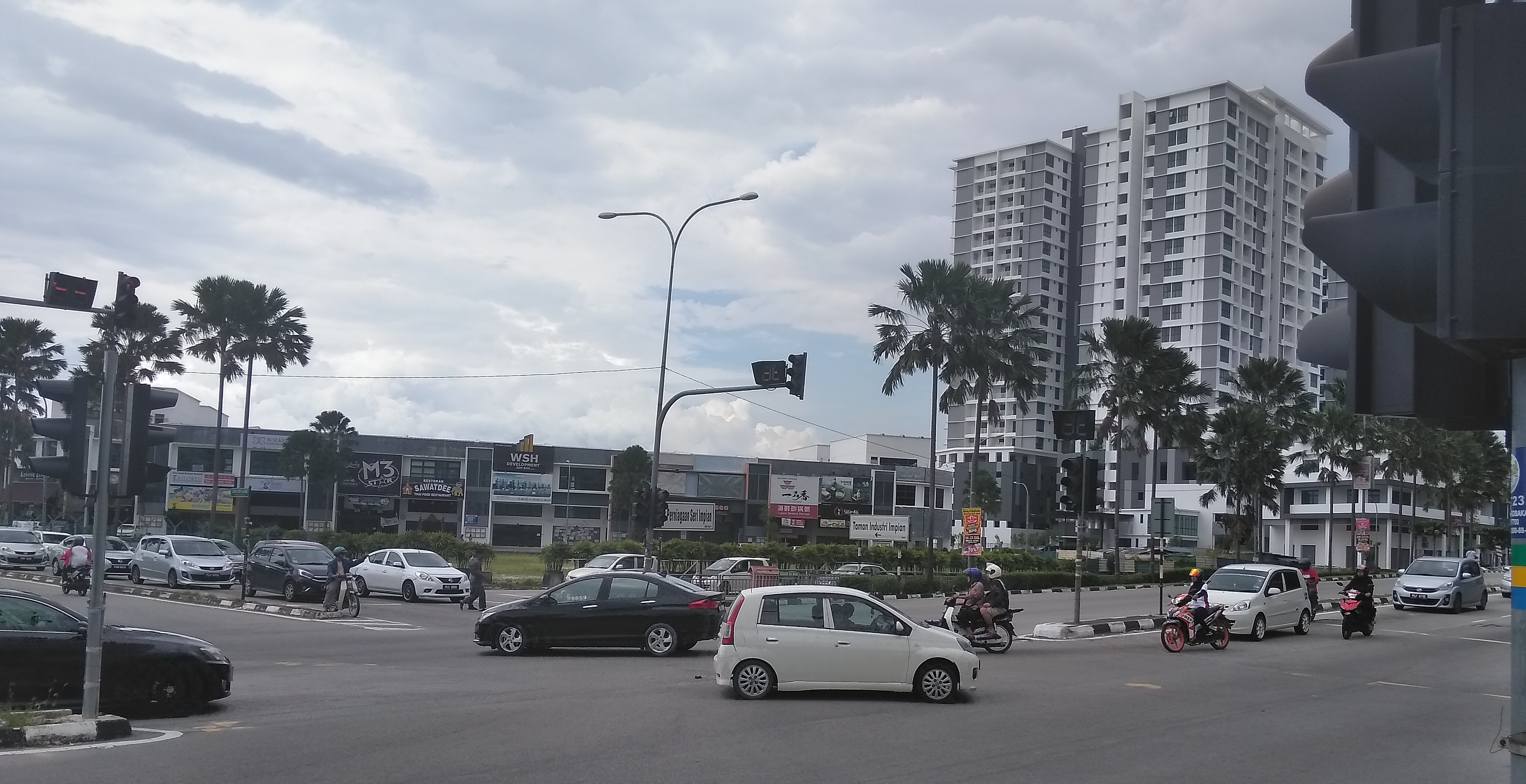
- Interactive map of Alma
- Location within Seberang Perai in Penang
- Coordinates: 5°19′N 100°30′E
- Country: Malaysia
- State: Penang
- City: Seberang Perai
- District: Central Seberang Perai

Area
  - Total: 34.8 km^{2} (13.4 sq mi)

Population (2020)
  - Total: 114,377
  - Density: 3,290/km^{2} (8,510/sq mi)

Demographics
  - Ethnic groups: 54.3% Chinese; 25.3% Bumiputera; 25.0% Malay; 0.2% indigenous groups from Sabah and Sarawak; 10.7% Indian; 0.4% Other ethnicities; 9.3% Non-citizens
- Time zone: UTC+8 (MST)
  - Summer (DST): Not observed
- Postal code: 14000

Alma is a suburb of Seberang Perai in the Malaysian state of Penang. It is located south of Bukit Mertajam and southeast of Bukit Tengah. Popular shopping areas in Alma include Lotus's and AEON Mall Bukit Mertajam, which started operations in 2014.

== Administration and demographics ==
Alma is located within the Machang Bubok state constituency, which contains 17 Village Community Management Councils (MPKK)—the highest number for any state seat in Penang. Eight of these MPKKs are situated within the Alma area. According to 2015 statistics from the Seberang Perai City Council, Alma had a population of 61,394 with an annual growth rate of 2% to 3%. This makes it the second most populated suburb in the district, trailing only Seberang Jaya (73,117). The majority of local residents are Malaysian Chinese. In 2025, the Penang state government conducted a revision of town boundaries, officially gazetting the township of Bandar Alma. Effective from 2026, the new township administration encompasses the lands formerly under Mukim 14 and Mukim 15 of the Central Seberang Perai District.

== Demographics ==
Ethnicities within Alma in 2020
Ethnicities / Nationality	Percentage
Chinese	54.3%
Malays	25.0%
Other Bumiputeras	0.2%
Indians	10.7%
Others	0.4%
Non-Malaysians	9.3%

As of 2020, Mukim 14 and 15, the subdivision that contains Alma, was home to a population of 114,377. Ethnic Chinese comprised nearly 54% of the population. Malays formed another one-fourth of the suburb's population.
