= Penang State Route P21 =

Road in Penang, Malaysia

Penang Route 21
- Jalan Song Ban Kheng (Malay) 宋万庆路 (Chinese)

Route information
- Maintained by the Penang State Government
- Length: 3.597 km (2.235 mi)
- History: Opened 1999

Major junctions
- East end: Jalan Maju
- P18 Jalan Kebun Sireh; Jalan Chian Heng Kai; Jalan Nangka; Jalan Binjal; Jalan Tembikai; Jalan Betek; Jalan Kota Permai; Jalan Bukit Kecil; P18 Jalan Sri Bukit/Jalan Megat Harun; Jalan Maju
- West end: Jalan Kebun Sireh (near to Bukit Tengah)

Location
- Country: Malaysia
- Primary destinations: Bukit Tengah, Taman Sri Rambai, Kota Permai, Sungai Rambai

Highway system
- Highways in Malaysia; Expressways; Federal; State

Penang State Route P21, Song Ban Kheng Road or Jalan Song Ban Kheng is one of the main roads in Bukit Mertajam, Penang. It runs east–west to connect with Jalan Kebun Sireh in the west, and the Jalan Maju flyover in the east. It is the main road to reach Bukit Mertajam Town from the west. From the Exit 160 (Juru Interchange) of the North–South Expressway, drivers can take Jalan Kebun Nenas followed by Jalan Chian Heng Kai to reach here.

Lined with a number of commercial centers such as the Pusat Perniagaan Gemilang Jaya, this Road also connects to Jalan Betik, where the Bukit Mertajam Branch of Seberang Perai Municipal Council is located, with a lot of government agencies available such as the Bukit Mertajam Magistrate Court and District Land Office.

== History ==
Serving as a bypass from the city centre, Song Ban Kheng Road was built in 1999 outside Bukit Mertajam to cater for traffic from Bukit Tengah to Maju Jaya. It was named after Song Ban Kheng, who had been the principal for Jit Sin High School for about 20 years and was a state assemblyman for the former state constitute Pekan Bukit Mertajam in 1983. Nowadays, this road has helped in creating some new townships such as Kota Permai, Taman Gemilang Jaya, Taman Desa Damai and others. This road was made into 4 lanes with bridges on 21 March 2015.

This road is also nearby Jalan Betik, also known as Government Road, where a lot of government agencies are located, including:

- Jabatan Kerja Raya
- Bukit Mertajam High Court
- MPSP Stadium
- Central Seberang Perai District Land Office
- Seberang Perai Municipal Council Bukit Mertajam Branch
