= South Seberang Perai District =

District in Seberang Perai, Penang, Malaysia

- District of Penang
- Daerah Seberang Perai Selatan
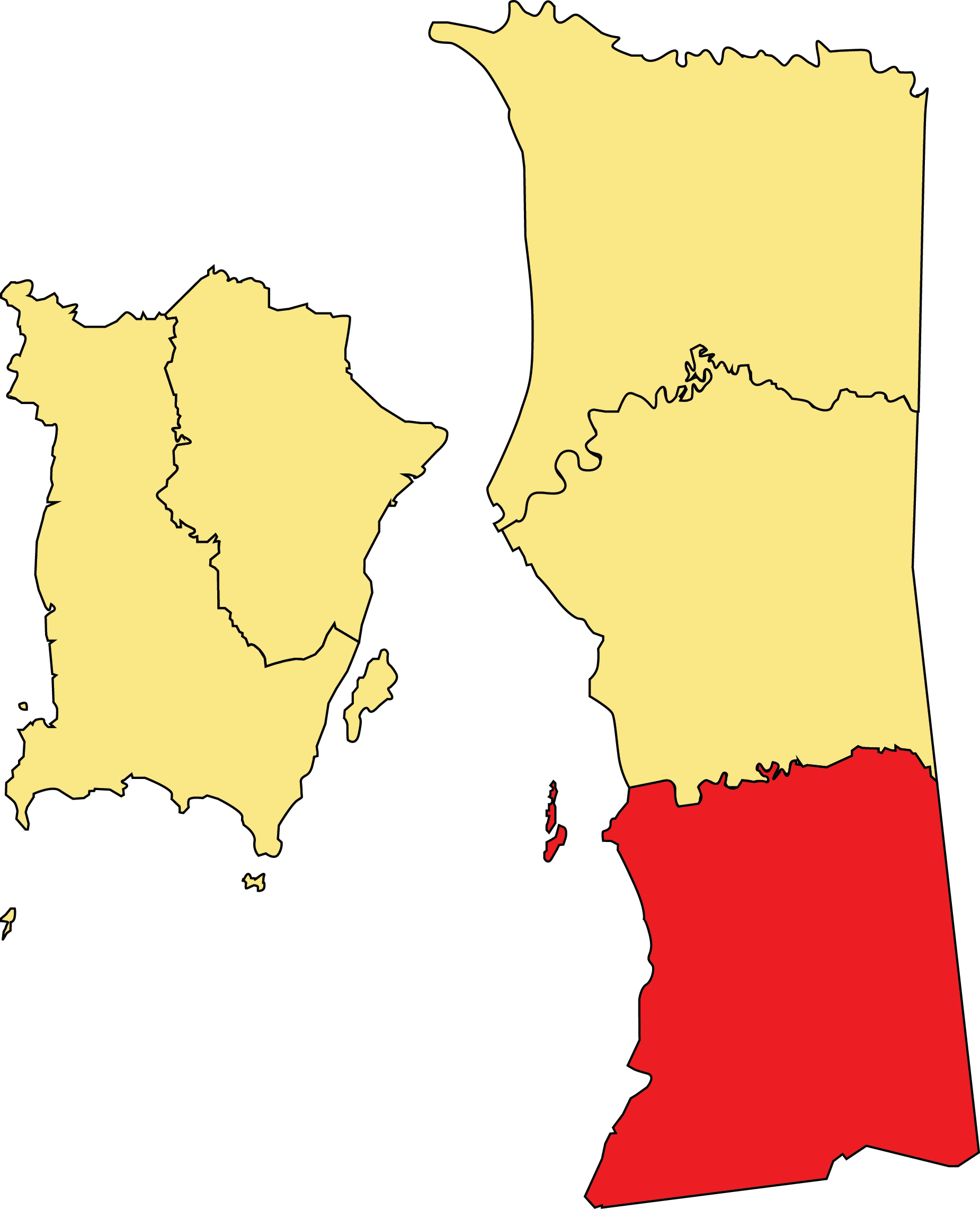
- South Seberang Perai within Penang
- Country: Malaysia
- State: Penang
- City: Seberang Perai
- Seat: Sungai Jawi

Government
  - Local government: Seberang Perai City Council

Area
  - Total: 243.2 km^{2} (93.9 sq mi)

Population (2020)
  - Total: 184,007
  - Density: 756.6/km^{2} (1,960/sq mi)
- Postal code: 141xx–143xx
- Website: portalpdt.penang.gov.my/index.php/ms/sps

The South Seberang Perai District is a district in Seberang Perai within the Malaysian state of Penang. The district covers the southern third of Seberang Perai. It borders Central Seberang Perai to the north, Kedah to the east and Perak to the south. The district, along with the North and Central Seberang Perai districts, falls under the jurisdiction of the Seberang Perai City Council.

== Administrative divisions ==
The South Seberang Perai District is further divided into 18 subdivisions, officially known as mukims.

Population density by subdivisions in Southern Seberang Perai
| Subdivision | Population (2020) | Area (km^{2}) | Population density (/km^{2}) |
|---|---|---|---|
| Mukim 1 | 2,405 | 6.1 | 394 |
| Mukim 2 | 1,510 | 4.8 | 315 |
| Mukim 3 | 1,730 | 10.3 | 168 |
| Mukim 4 | 9,884 | 13.2 | 749 |
| Mukim 5 | 8,711 | 8.9 | 979 |
| Mukim 6 | 7,679 | 9.1 | 844 |
| Mukim 7 | 20,102 | 18.4 | 1,093 |
| Mukim 8 | 2,382 | 15.3 | 156 |
| Mukim 9 | 18,802 | 16.1 | 1,168 |
| Mukim 10 | 9,033 | 21.6 | 418 |
| Mukim 11 | 19,586 | 45.9 | 427 |
| Mukim 12 | 10,290 | 9.6 | 1,072 |
| Mukim 13 | 11,409 | 29.5 | 387 |
| Mukim 14 | 22,990 | 13.9 | 1,654 |
| Mukim 15 | 35,638 | 18.5 | 1,926 |
| Mukim 16 | 191 | 1.2 | 159 |
| Nibong Tebal | 1,425 | 0.7 | 2,036 |
| Sungai Bakap | 240 | 0.1 | 2,400 |

== See also ==
- Northeast Penang Island District
- Southwest Penang Island District
