= Cherok Tok Kun =

- Neighbourhood of Seberang Perai
- Location within Seberang Perai in Penang
- Coordinates: 5°20′0″N 100°29′0″E
- Country: Malaysia
- State: Penang
- City: Seberang Perai
- District: Central Seberang Perai
- Time zone: UTC+8 (MST)
  - Summer (DST): Not observed
- Postal code: 14000

Cherok Tokun (also spelt as Cherok To' Kun or Cherok Tok Kun) is a residential neighbourhood within the city of Seberang Perai in the Malaysian state of Penang. It is the birthplace of Dato’ Seri Anwar Ibrahim, Malaysia’s 10th Prime Minister.

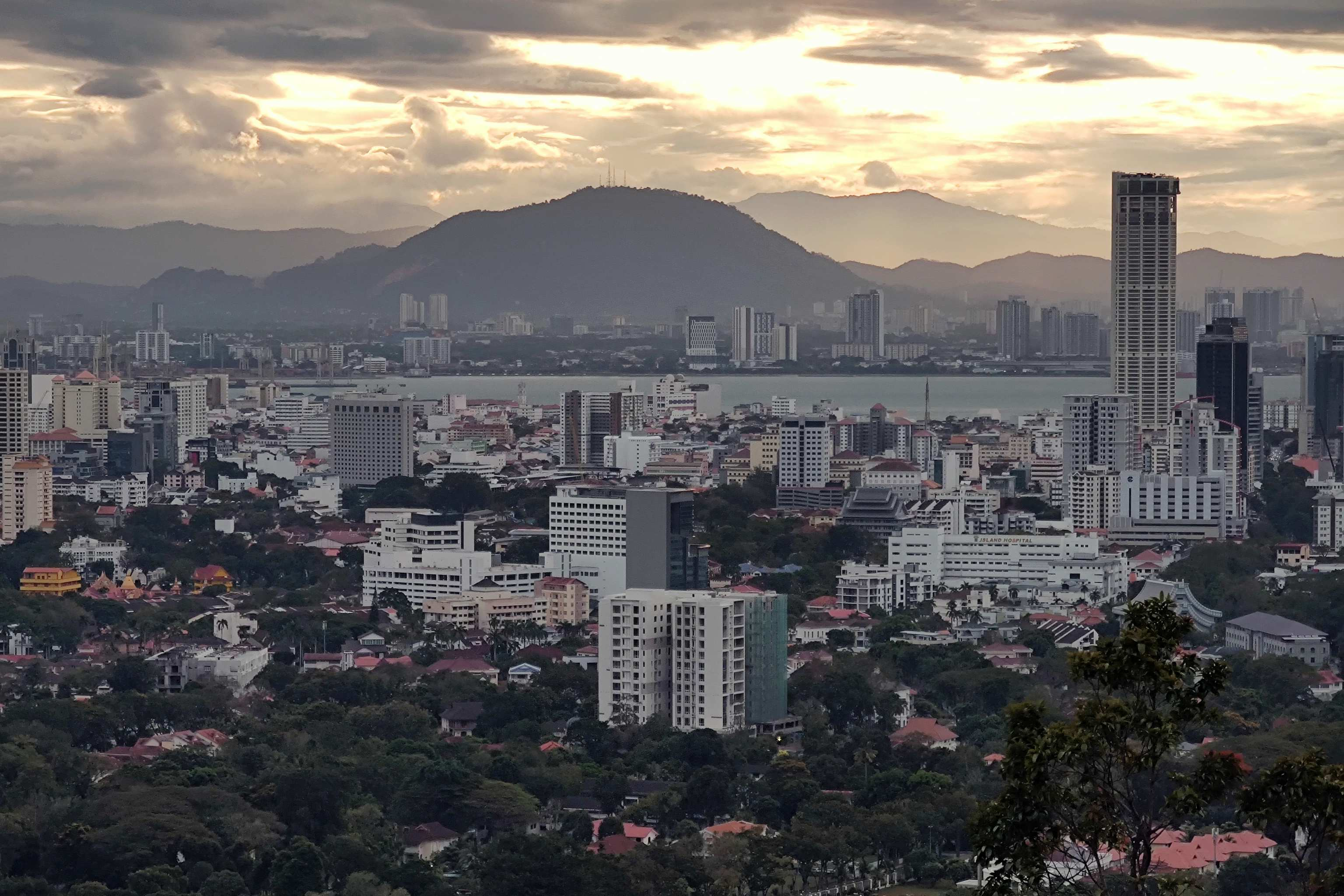
545-metre (1,788 ft) Mertajam Hill or Tok Kun Hill viewed from Penang Island at sunset
