= City Tower, Seberang Perai =

City hall in Seberang Perai, Penang, Malaysia

City Tower
- Menara Bandaraya (Malay)
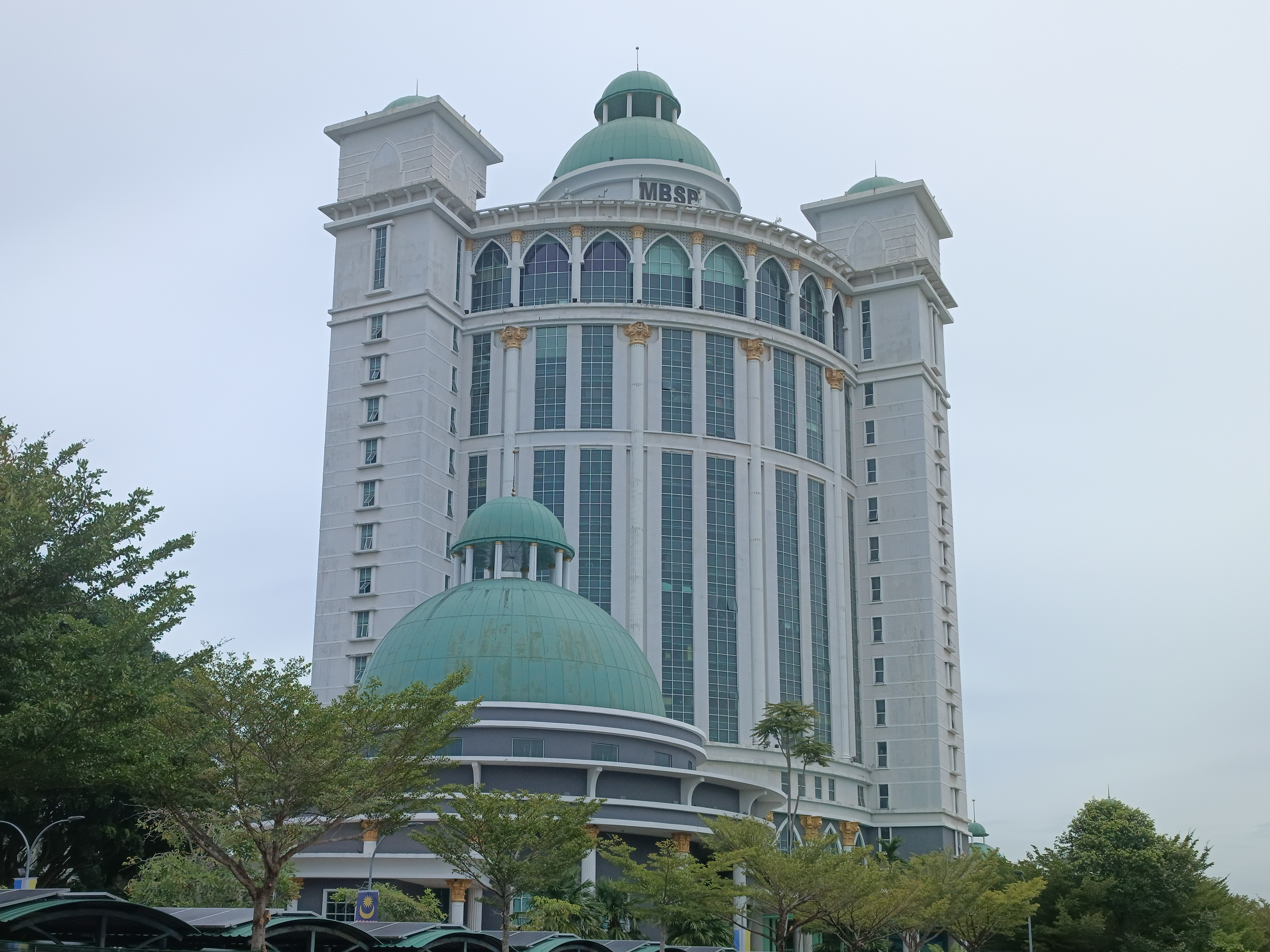
- Interactive map of the City Tower area
- Former names: MPSP Tower (2005–2019); MBSP Tower (2019–2019)

General information
- Location: Jalan Perda Utama, 14000 Bukit Tengah, Seberang Perai, Penang, Malaysia, Seberang Perai, Penang, Malaysia
- Coordinates: 5.3707°N 100.4329°E
- Construction started: 2002
- Completed: 2005
- Opened: 2006
- Owner: Seberang Perai City Council

Height
- Height: 90.5 m (297 ft)
- Top floor: 16

Technical details
- Floor count: 16
- Floor area: 290,000 m^{2} (3,100,000 sq ft)
- Grounds: 10 acres (4.0 ha)

The City Tower, formerly known as MBSP Tower, is the local government headquarters of Seberang Perai within the Malaysian state of Penang. Completed in 2005, it serves as the seat of the Seberang Perai City Council (abbrev. MBSP).

== History ==
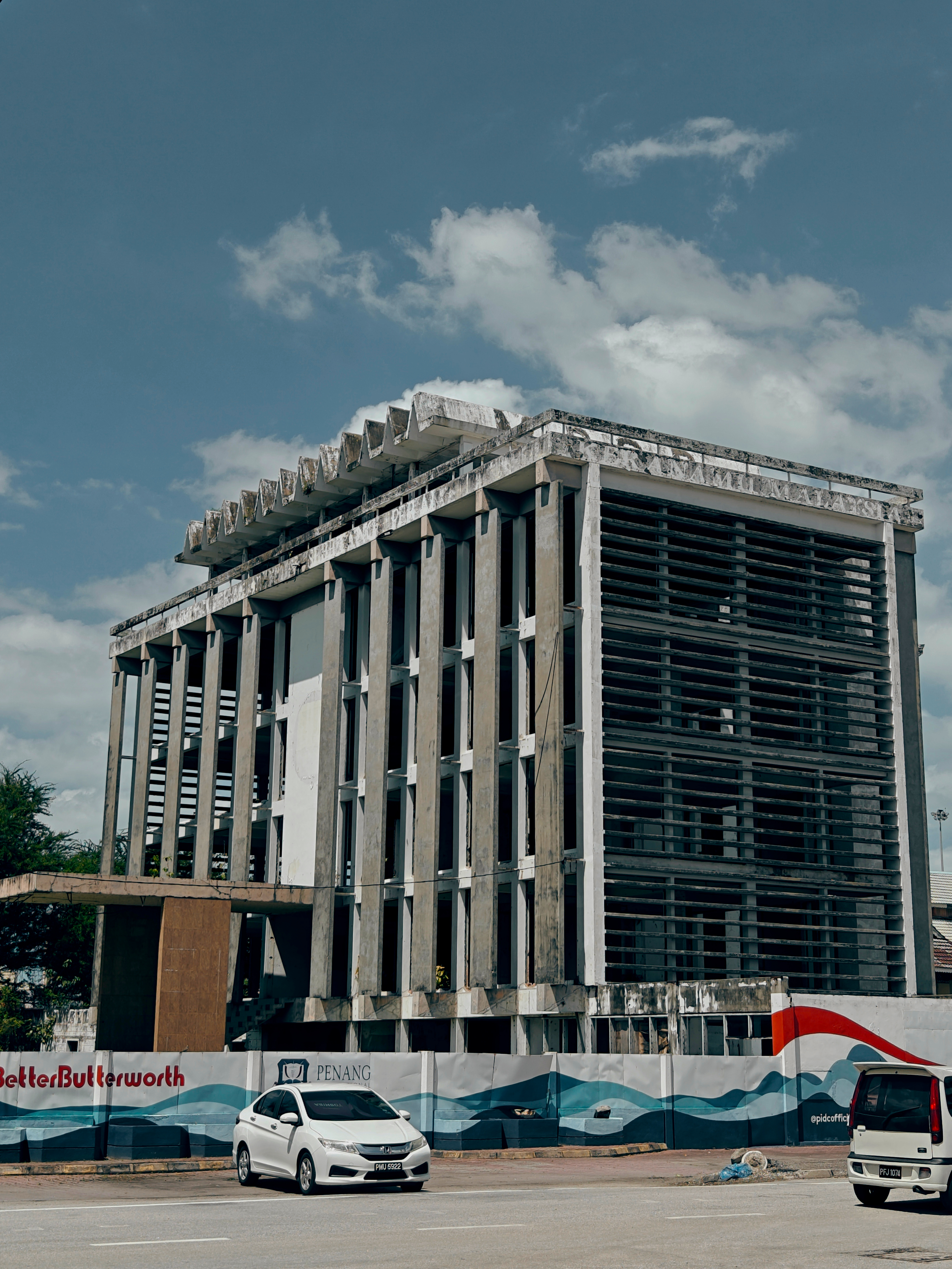
The former Seberang Perai City Council headquarters at Butterworth, in use until 2006.

Prior to the construction of the building, the headquarters of the Seberang Perai City Council (MBSP) was a five-storey building at Butterworth. As the local government expanded its workforce and responsibilities, the existing office space became insufficient.

In 2001, the city council acquired the present-day 10-acre (4.0 ha) site at Bandar Perda from the Penang Regional Development Authority (PERDA) for RM13.5 million. Construction of the new 16-storey headquarters began in 2002 and was completed by 2005. The city council relocated to the new premises in the following year. The building was renamed City Tower in 2019, following Seberang Perai's ascension to city status that year.

The construction of the tower was mired in controversy. Between 2000 and 2007, MBSP's reserves shrank by RM230 million. While the official cost of the tower was RM53 million, allegations arose that MBSP spent RM85 million on the new headquarters. Cost overruns also compelled the developer, associated with the then-ruling Barisan Nasional coalition, to scale down construction to the present-day building. After Pakatan Rakyat (now Pakatan Harapan) gained control of the state in 2008, newly elected Chief Minister Lim Guan Eng initiated investigations into the alleged misappropriation by the local government, which reportedly led to a loss of development funds for the municipality.

== See also ==
- City Hall, George Town
