= Seberang Perai =

City in the Malaysian state of Penang

Seberang Perai Province Wellesley
- City
- City of Seberang Perai Bandaraya Seberang Perai (Malay)
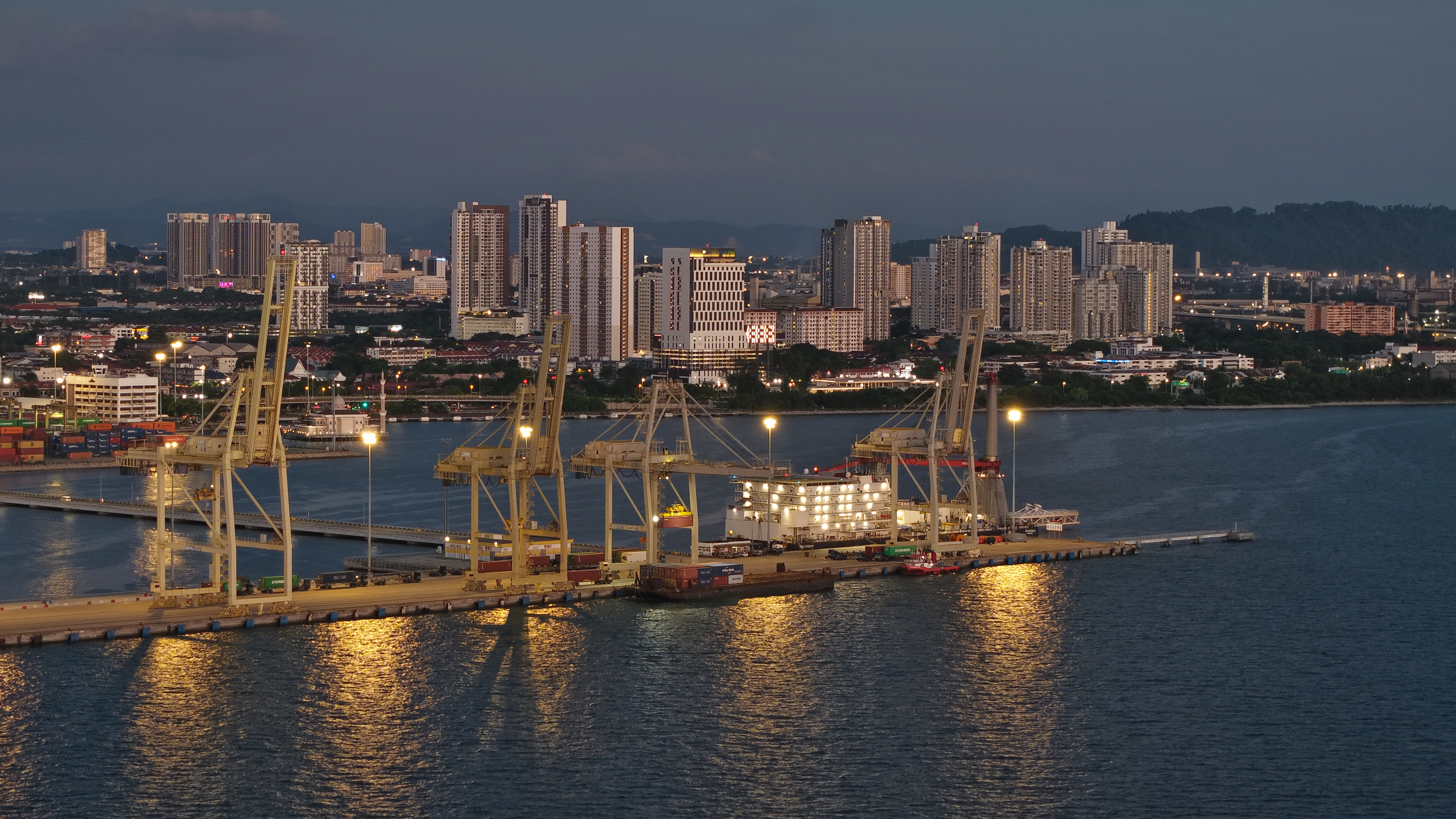
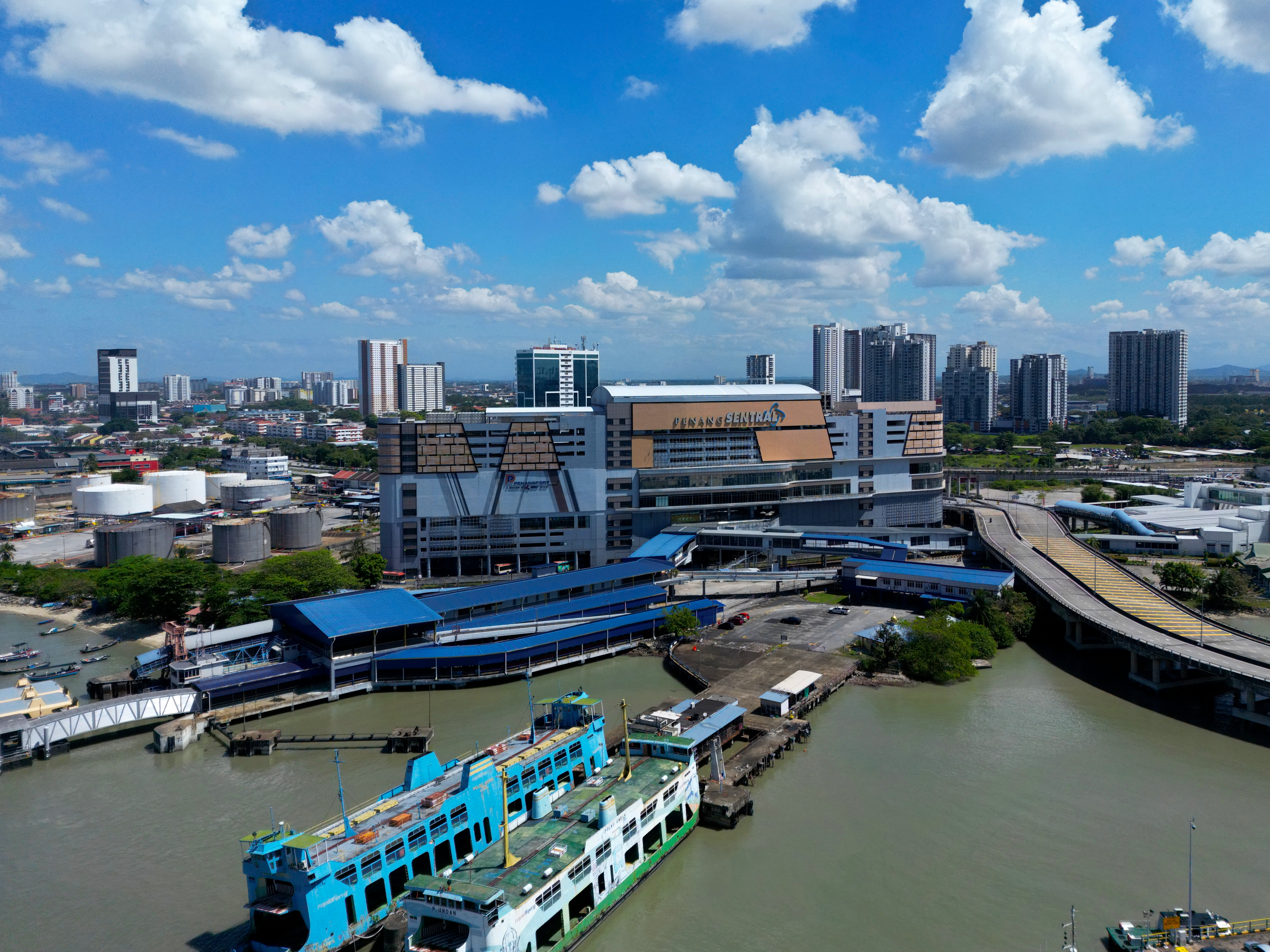
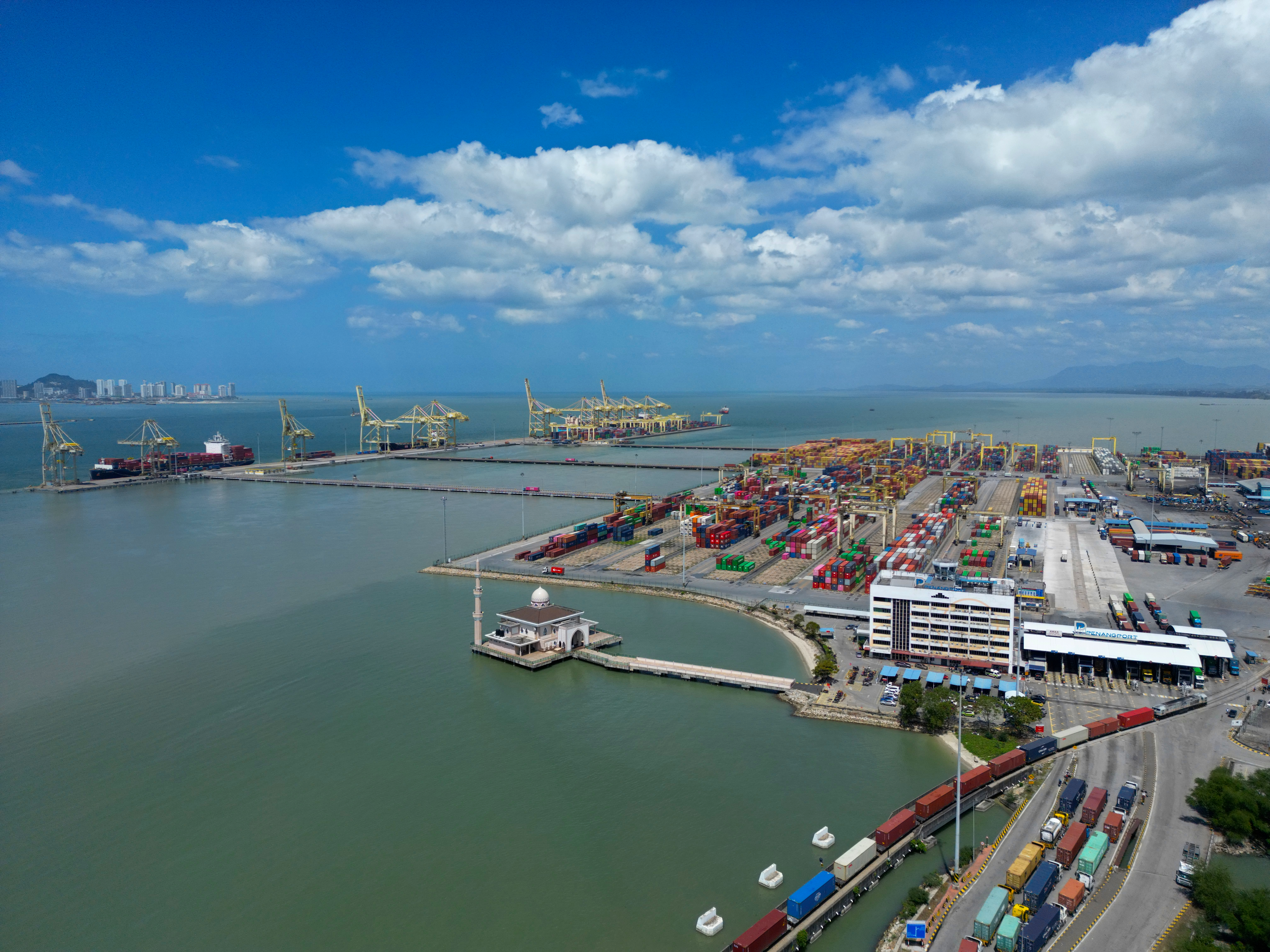
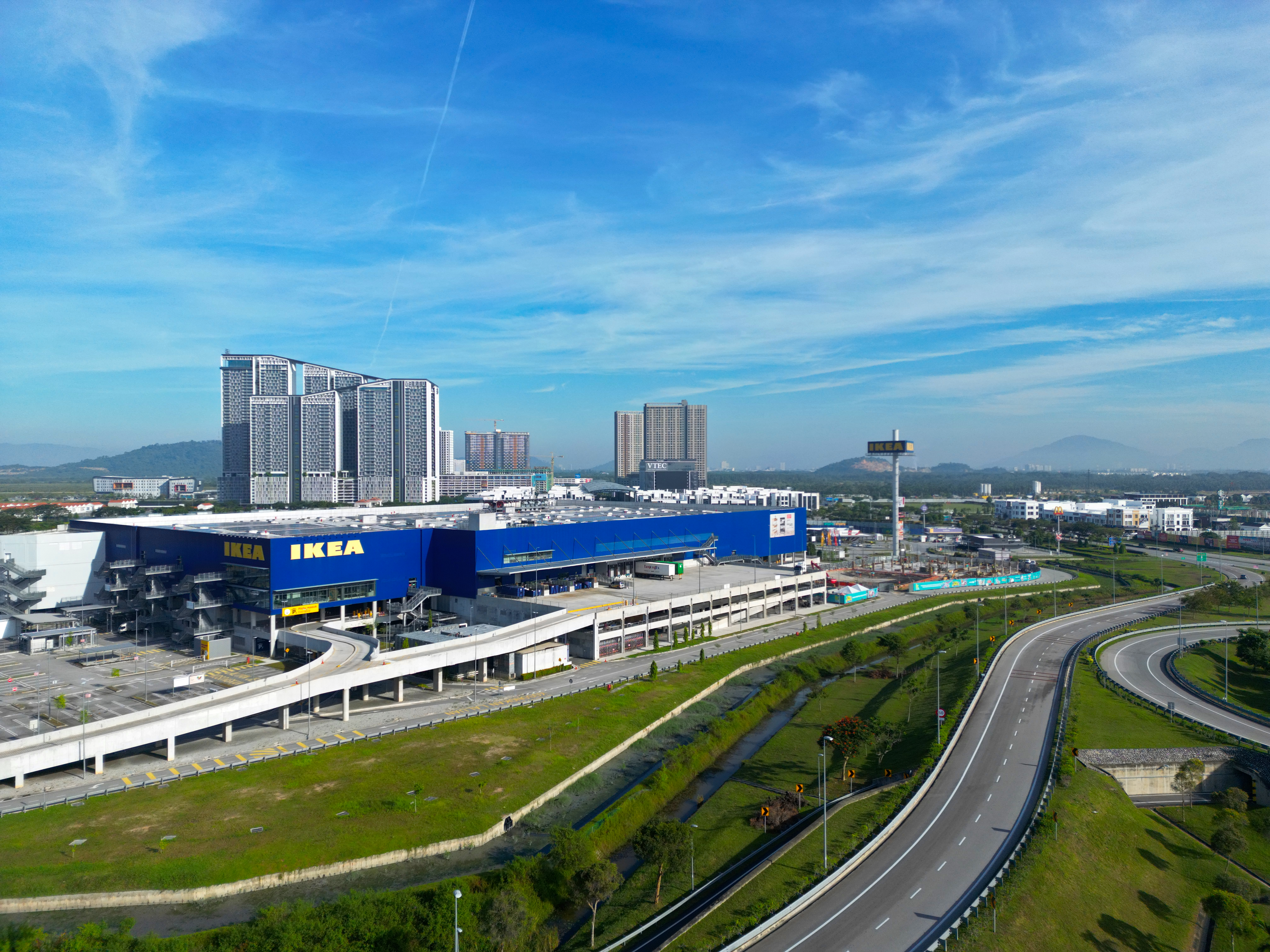
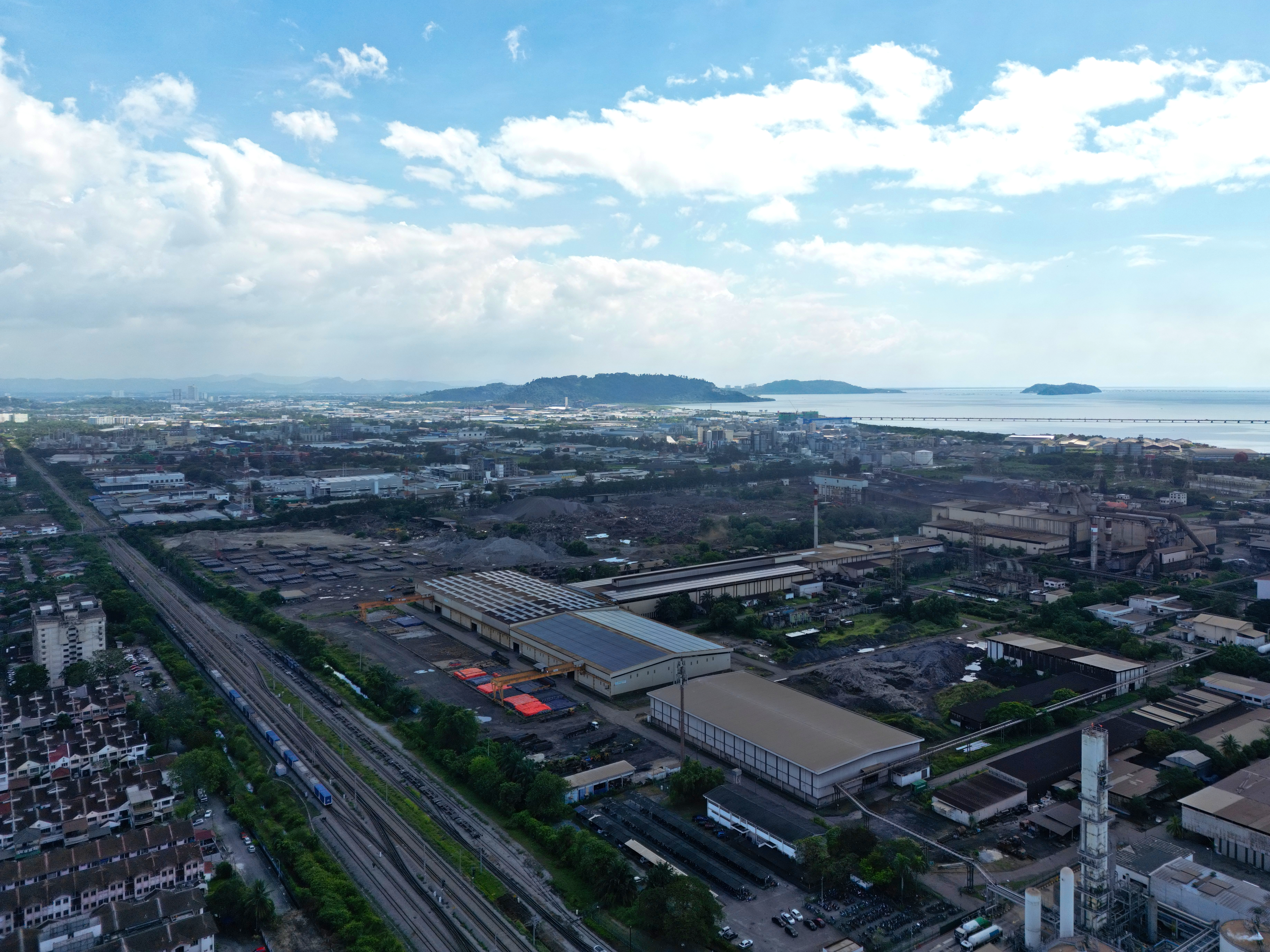
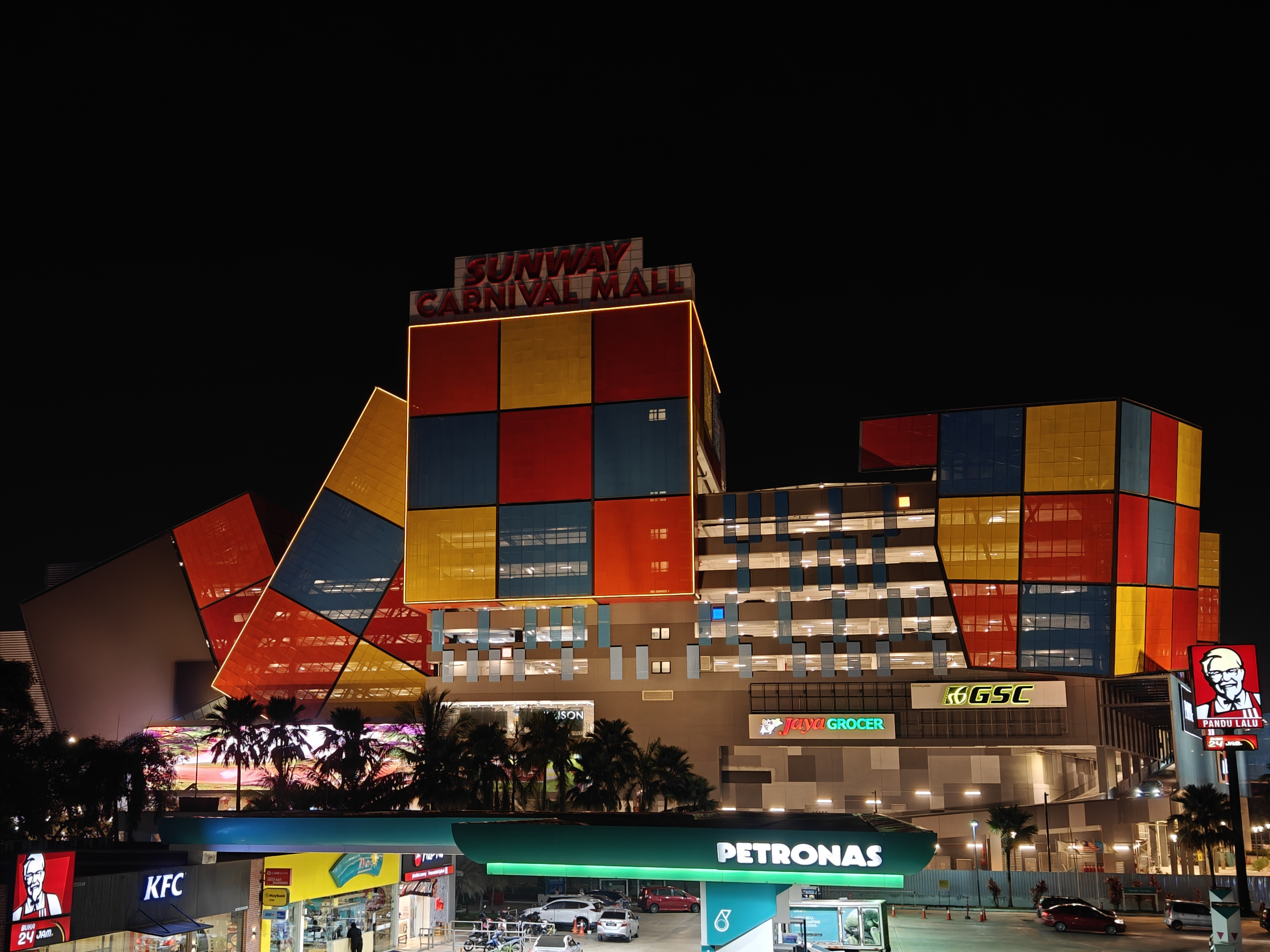
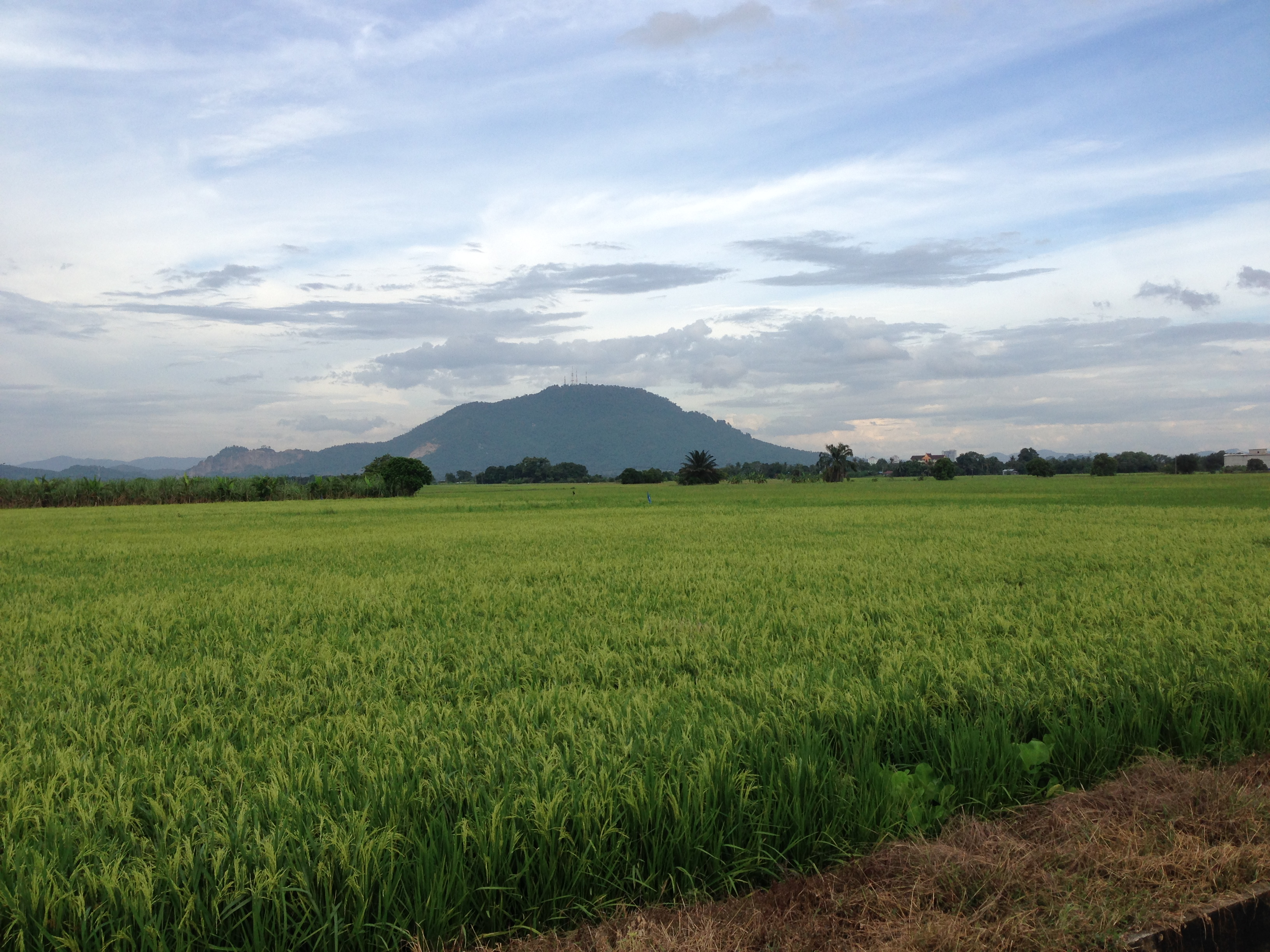
- Skyline of Butterworth Penang Sentral Port of Penang Batu Kawan township Perai Free Industrial Zone Sunway Carnival Mall Bukit Mertajam Hill

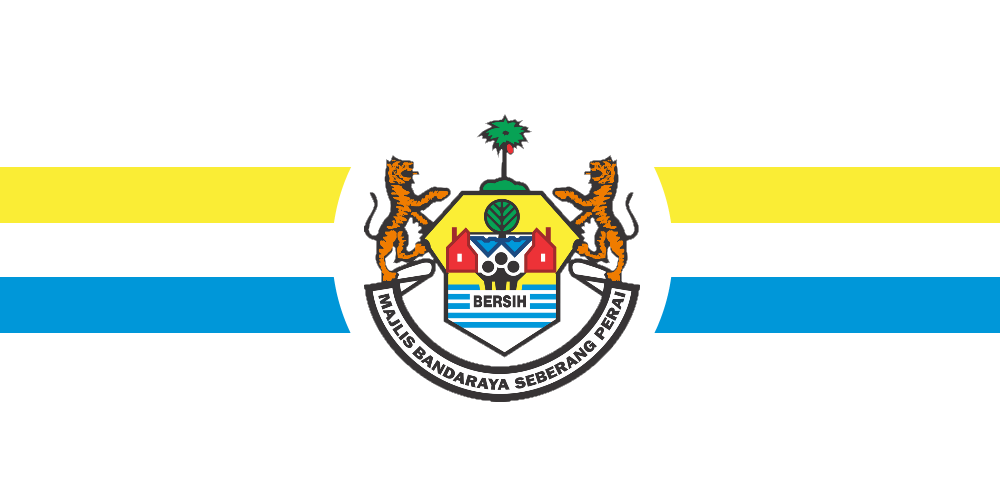
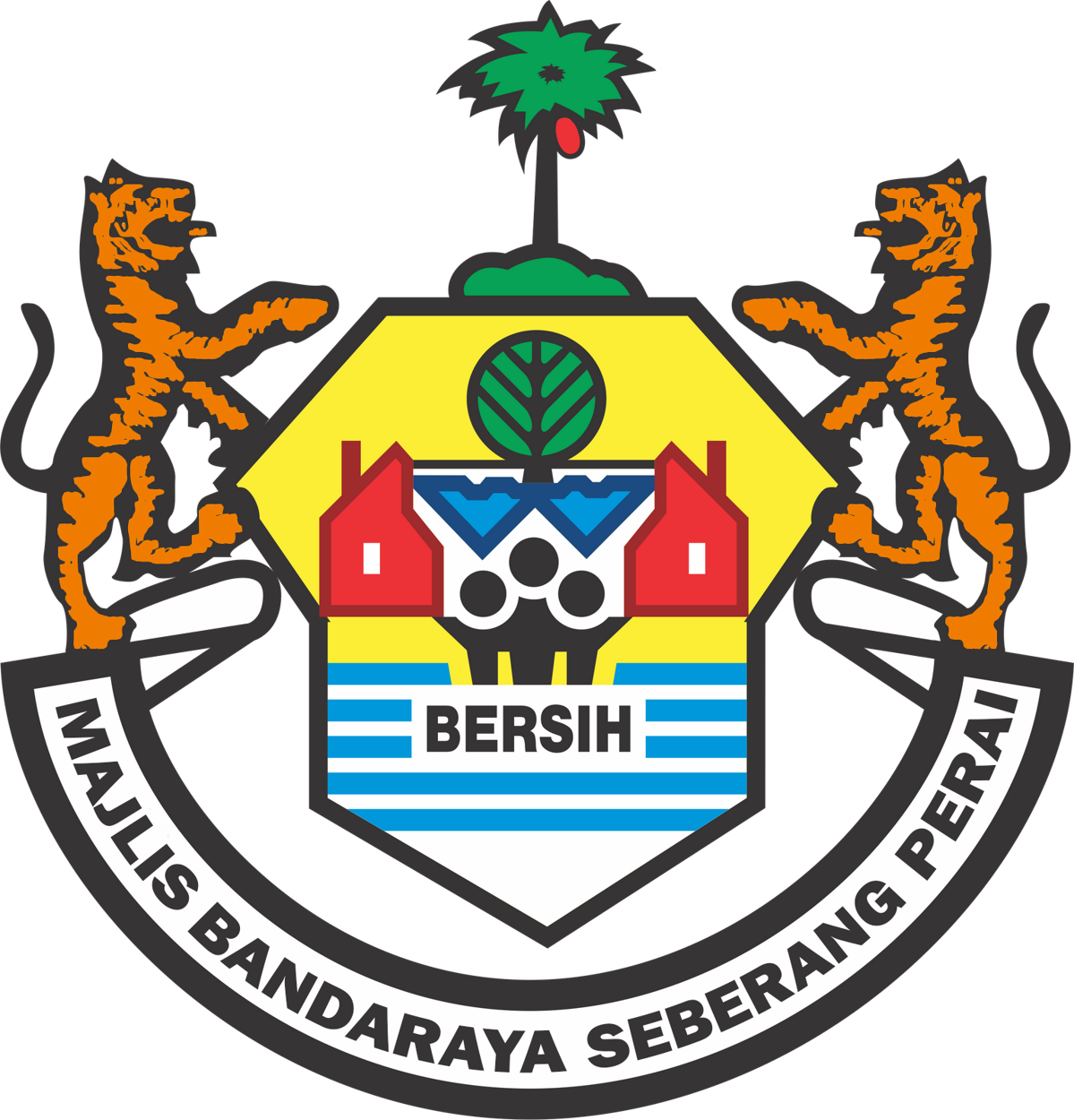
- Flag Seal
- Motto: Bersih (Malay) "Clean" (motto of Seberang Perai City Council)
- Location within Seberang Perai, Penang Location within Malaysia Location within Asia
- Coordinates: 5°24′29.95″N 100°22′10.37″E
- Country: Malaysia
- State: Penang
- Districts: North, Central and South
- Mukims: Butterworth and 57 subdistricts
- Founded: 1800
- Establishment of local governments: 1913
- Municipality: 15 December 1976
- Incorporated (city): 16 September 2019

Government
  - Type: City council
  - Body: Seberang Perai City Council
  - Mayor: Hj Baderul Amin Abdul Hamid
  - City Secretary: Mohd Ibrahim Md Nor

Area
  - City: 748 km^{2} (289 sq mi)

Population (2020)
  - City: 946,092
  - Rank: 3rd in Malaysia; 1st in Penang
  - Density: 1,264.8/km^{2} (3,276/sq mi)

Demographics (2020)
  - Ethnic groups: 49.3% Bumiputera; 49.0% Malay; 0.3% indigenous groups from Sabah and Sarawak; 32.9% Chinese; 9.6% Indian; 0.4% Other ethnicities; 7.7% Non-citizens

GDP (2020)
  - Total: $10.836 billion
  - Per capita: $11,453
- Time zone: UTC+8 (MST)
  - Summer (DST): Not observed
- Postal code: 12xxx–14xxx
- Area code(s): +604-3, +604-5
- Website: www.mbsp.gov.my

Seberang Perai is a city in the Malaysian state of Penang. Located on the Malay Peninsula and separated from Penang Island by the Penang Strait, it shares borders with Kedah to the north and east and Perak to the south. The city spans an area of 748 km^{2} (289 sq mi) and had a population of 946,092 as of 2020, making it the third largest city in Malaysia.

Originally a part of Kedah, the territory containing the city was ceded to the British East India Company in 1800. It was named Province Wellesley and has been administered as part of Penang ever since. The territory became a centre for cash crop agriculture, while the development of new towns such as Butterworth and Bukit Mertajam followed with the advent of roads and railways towards the end of the 19th century.

After Malaya's independence, Seberang Perai benefitted from the development spillover from George Town. The Port of Penang, the third busiest seaport in the country, was relocated to the municipality in 1974, bolstering its industrial-based economy that has attracted numerous multinational companies. Two road bridges were constructed to physically connect Seberang Perai with George Town, complementing an existing ferry service between the two cities. Penang Sentral, a new transit-oriented development, has strengthened Seberang Perai's role as the logistics hub of northwestern Malaysia. Following decades of rapid urbanisation and infrastructural developments, Seberang Perai was conferred city status in 2019.

== Etymology ==
Seberang Perai was originally named Province Wellesley after Richard Wellesley, who was the Governor-General of India when the territory was acquired by the British East India Company (EIC) in 1800. The term "Seberang Perai" is believed to have emerged from a local expression used to refer to the northern banks of the Perai River. After the acquisition of Province Wellesley, the river became the boundary between British-held territory to the south and Kedah to the north. Seberang means "the other side" in Malay. The Thai word plāi (Thai: ปลาย), meaning "the end", referred to the southern limits of Kedah, which were formed by the river.

The Hokkiens referred to the northern banks of the river as koay kang (過江, 过江, POJ: kòe-kang), which means "across the river". At the time, passengers from George Town would land at Perai and cross the river to get to Butterworth and the hinterland beyond. The term koay kang coincides with the Malay name Seberang Perai.

== History ==
Historical affiliations

British East India Company 1800–1858
British Raj 1858–1867
Straits Settlements 1826–1941; 1945–1946
Empire of Japan 1941–1945
Malayan Union 1946–1948
Federation of Malaya 1948–1963
Malaysia 1963–present

=== Early history ===
Seberang Perai bears evidence of human habitation during the Neolithic era. The site of Guar Kepah, located on the southern banks of the Muda River, is home to human remains found in shell middens that indicate the settlement of the area in that period. Guar Kepah remains the only known example of coastal adaptation among Neolithic humans in Malaysia.

Seberang Perai was once a part of the Bujang Valley civilisation. The Mahanavika Buddhagupta plaque and the Cherok Tok Kun megalith, found at Bukit Mertajam, both indicate significant Hindu influence in the area between the 5th and 6th centuries.

=== British rule ===
British acquisition and expansion of Penang (in yellow) occurred between 1786 and 1874, when the final alterations to Penang's boundaries was enacted.

In 1592, a British ship arrived in Seberang Perai. Later, in 1800, the British East India Company (EIA) annexed a strip of the mainland from Kedah for a sum of 4,000 Spanish dollars. This acquisition, negotiated by George Caunter on behalf of Lieutenant-Governor George Leith, gave the EIC permanent sovereignty over both Penang Island and the newly acquired territory, which was named Province Wellesley after Governor-General of India Richard Wellesley. The Perai River became the international border between British and Kedah territories.

The EIC had sought to turn the island into an agricultural outpost. The annexation of Province Wellesley allowed for the expansion of the cash crop industry from the island to the mainland. This led to the harvesting of spices and sugar, which attracted migrants from China, India, Myanmar and the Middle East, as well as Malay refugees from Kedah fleeing the Siamese conquest of their homeland. In 1831, the EIC expanded Province Wellesley northwards, moving the international border between British and Siamese territories from the Perai River to the Muda River. The territory's boundaries were further extended in 1868 and in the Pangkor Treaty of 1874, effectively enlarging the British-held territory from the Muda River in the north to the Kerian River in the south.

The development of roads and railways in the early 20th century promoted the growth of Province Wellesley's rubber industry. Malaya's new rail lines, which ran from the Siamese border to the north to Singapore to the south, cut through Province Wellesley, allowing the Port of Penang to become a major tin exporter. This led to the emergence of new towns, such as Butterworth and Bukit Mertajam, as logistics hubs. The Municipal Ordinance of 1913 resulted in the creation of three local governments within Province Wellesley – the Butterworth and Bukit Mertajam town boards, and the Province Wellesley Rural Board. The creation of local governments further accelerated infrastructural developments within the territory.

=== World War II ===
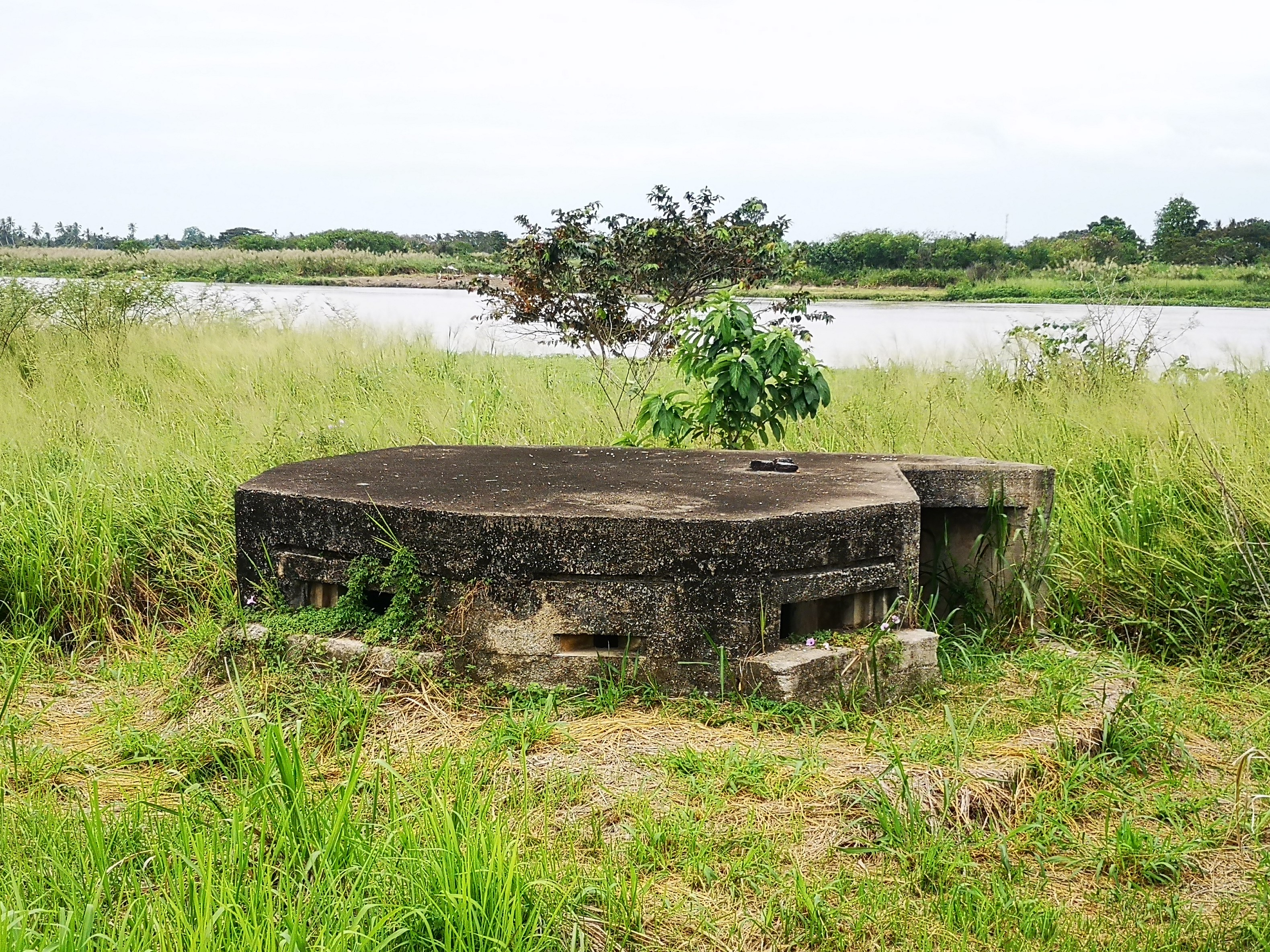
A British-built pillbox along the northern frontier of Province Wellesley.

RAF Butterworth was opened just a few months prior to the outbreak of hostilities between Britain and Japan in December 1941. As Japanese troops landed in Kota Bharu and Songkhla, Allied squadrons defending northern Malaya were decimated and had to retreat to RAF Butterworth by 8 December. The air base was subsequently attacked by Japanese bombers the following day. The Royal Air Force abandoned it on 15 December, and Penang fell to the Japanese four days later.

During the Japanese occupation, Province Wellesley, like George Town, underwent significant social upheaval. Civilians suffered harsh treatment from the Japanese, who attempted to enforce order, while living conditions worsened along with the economic situation. Rice farmers in Province Wellesley were encouraged to increase their yields, but the rice supply deficit proved too great to overcome. Despite the establishment of "pioneer farms" in the territory by Japanese administrators in 1944, food shortages persisted until the end of the war when British forces liberated Penang. Following the war's end, British authorities swiftly undertook action to restore order in Province Wellesley, which was plagued by elements of the Chinese underworld and communist infiltrations.

=== Post-independence ===
In 1953, the British reorganised the local governments within the territory. Five local governments – one each for the municipalities of Butterworth and Bukit Mertajam, and three rural district councils – were instituted. After Malaya gained independence in 1957, the ruling Alliance coalition moved to amalgamate the local governments within Seberang Perai. In 1961, the Butterworth and Bukit Mertajam municipalities were consolidated with the North and Central Seberang Perai rural district councils, respectively. The three remaining local governments were subsequently merged into a single municipality in 1974. Two years later, Seberang Perai was conferred municipal status and the local government was renamed the Seberang Perai Municipal Council.

In the early 1960s, the Penang state government began industrialising Seberang Perai through the establishment of the first industrial estates at Mak Mandin and Perai. In 1974, the Port of Penang was relocated from George Town to the municipality, and in 1980, the adjacent Perai Free Industrial Zone was created to take advantage of the available maritime and rail infrastructure. These were accompanied by a significant increase in the municipality's population, which was largely due to the spillover of development from George Town.

Decades of economic growth and the availability of industrial land have led to substantial investments in infrastructure, including the completions of the Penang Bridge and the Second Penang Bridge that connect the municipality with George Town. The industrial sector has also spurred the development of newer townships within the municipality, such as Seberang Jaya and Batu Kawan. Seberang Perai was granted city status in 2019.

==== Dispute with Kedah ====
There is a long-standing friction between Kedah and Penang on the historical status of Penang, particularly Seberang Perai, as a "leased territory" rather than a fully ceded one. The Kedah state government has maintained that Penang is "historically a part of Kedah" and operates under a "perpetual lease agreement dating back to the late 18th century." Consequently, Kedah has repeatedly demanded that the federal government facilitate an increase in the annual "lease payment" paid to Kedah, arguing that the existing sum, an amount set at RM10 million following a 2018 federal adjustment, is inadequate and fails to reflect the current economic reality or the historical sovereignty claims held by the Kedah Sultanate. The Penang state government rejected the legitimacy of these demands, asserting its status as a "sovereign state within the Malaysian federation" and maintaining that the "federal payments are an administrative gesture rather than a commercial lease obligation," claiming that Kedah's calls for increased compensation as "politically motivated rather than legally grounded."

== Geography ==
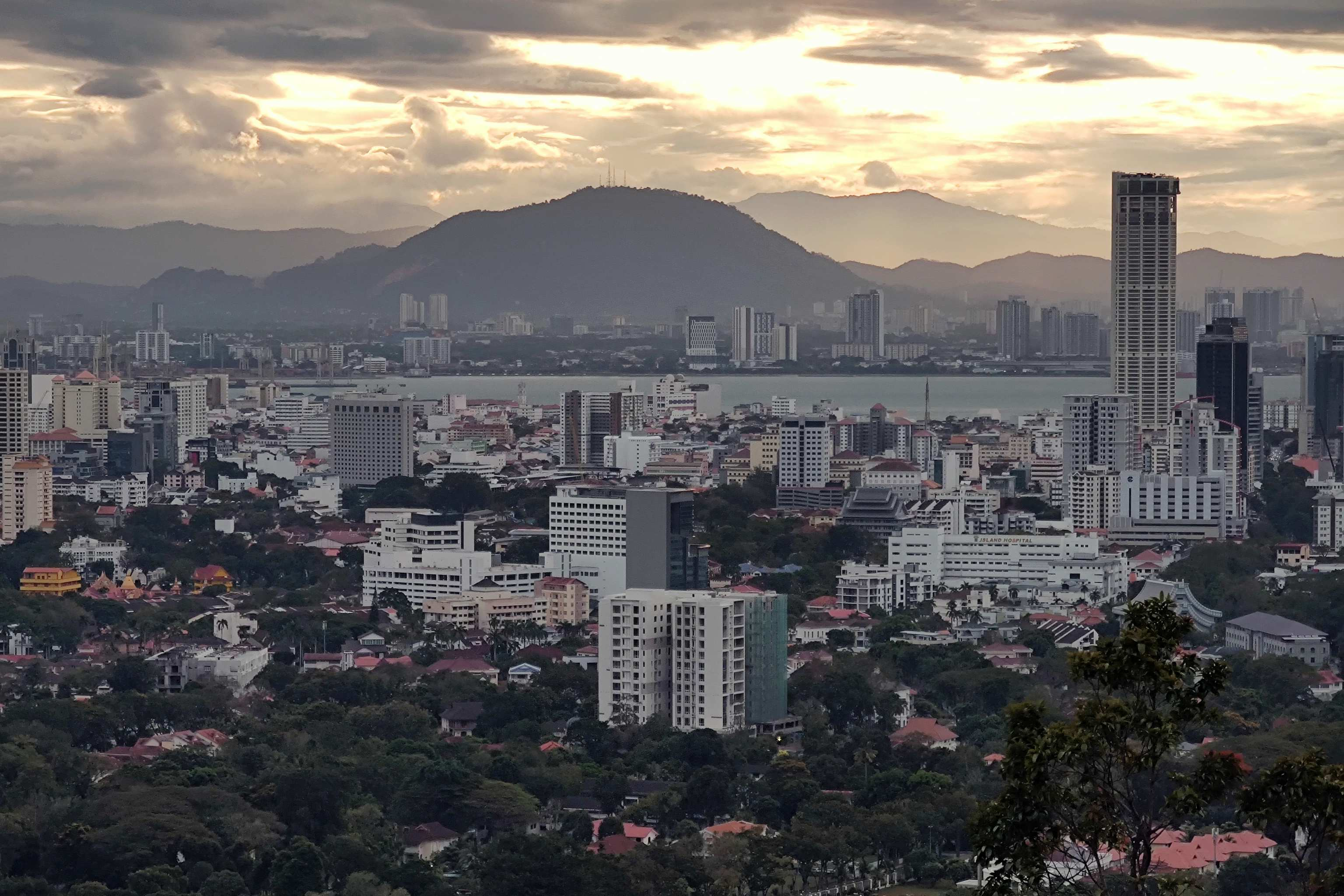
545-metre (1,788 ft) Mertajam Hill viewed from Penang Island at sunset

Seberang Perai spans the entire mainland portion of Penang. With a total land mass of 747.8 km^{2} (288.7 sq mi), Seberang Perai is about the same size as Singapore.^{α} The terrain of the city is mostly flat and alluvial, except for the hilly region that lays along its eastern border with Kedah. Standing at a height of 1,787 ft (545 m), Mertajam Hill is the tallest point within Seberang Perai. The city's coast is divided into a northern sandy shoreline and a muddy, mangrove-covered southern coastline. The southern coast is geographically sheltered by Penang Island, while the northern shoreline is more exposed to the Malacca Strait.

Seberang Perai's jurisdiction also includes two offshore islets – Aman and Gedung islands. These islets feature mudflats that connect with the mainland due to sedimentation that occurred during the construction of the Penang Bridge.

The city is demarcated by the Muda River to the north, which serves as the border between Seberang Perai and Kedah. To the south, the tripoint between Seberang Perai, Kedah and Perak lies within the Kerian River. Several riverine systems flow through the city, including Perai, Juru, Jejawi and Tengah rivers. River pollution caused by industrial waste has been a persistent issue for decades, with the Juru, Jawi and Perai rivers classified as having average water quality (Class III) by Malaysia's Department of Environment since 2016.

Map of subdistricts within Seberang Perai.
Click link at the top right corner to zoom in.
1 Butterworth
2 Batu Kawan
3 Bukit Mertajam
4 Bukit Minyak
5 Bukit Tambun
6 Alma
7 Juru
8 Kepala Batas
9 Mak Mandin
10 Nibong Tebal
11 Perai
12 Permatang Pauh
13 Seberang Jaya
14 Sungai Bakap
15 Sungai Jawi
16 Tasek Gelugor
17 Teluk Air Tawar

=== Climate ===
Climate data for Butterworth (RMAF Butterworth Air Base) (2007–2020 normals, extremes 2015–2022)
| Month | Jan | Feb | Mar | Apr | May | Jun | Jul | Aug | Sep | Oct | Nov | Dec | Year |
|---|---|---|---|---|---|---|---|---|---|---|---|---|---|
| Record high °C (°F) | 35.9 (96.6) | 37.0 (98.6) | 36.6 (97.9) | 35.0 (95.0) | 34.0 (93.2) | 34.8 (94.6) | 34.4 (93.9) | 34.0 (93.2) | 34.0 (93.2) | 34.3 (93.7) | 33.9 (93.0) | 36.4 (97.5) | 37.0 (98.6) |
| Mean daily maximum °C (°F) | 31.6 (88.9) | 32.1 (89.8) | 32.2 (90.0) | 31.9 (89.4) | 31.8 (89.2) | 31.8 (89.2) | 31.5 (88.7) | 31.9 (89.4) | 31.3 (88.3) | 31.1 (88.0) | 30.9 (87.6) | 31.5 (88.7) | 31.6 (88.9) |
| Daily mean °C (°F) | 27.8 (82.0) | 28.1 (82.6) | 28.4 (83.1) | 28.6 (83.5) | 28.7 (83.7) | 28.6 (83.5) | 28.2 (82.8) | 28.1 (82.6) | 27.7 (81.9) | 27.7 (81.9) | 27.7 (81.9) | 27.7 (81.9) | 28.1 (82.6) |
| Mean daily minimum °C (°F) | 24.0 (75.2) | 24.1 (75.4) | 24.8 (76.6) | 25.3 (77.5) | 25.5 (77.9) | 25.4 (77.7) | 24.9 (76.8) | 24.7 (76.5) | 24.6 (76.3) | 24.6 (76.3) | 24.7 (76.5) | 24.5 (76.1) | 24.8 (76.6) |
| Record low °C (°F) | 22.3 (72.1) | 19.8 (67.6) | 21.6 (70.9) | 22.7 (72.9) | 23.3 (73.9) | 22.5 (72.5) | 22.2 (72.0) | 22.1 (71.8) | 22.0 (71.6) | 22.7 (72.9) | 22.8 (73.0) | 21.6 (70.9) | 19.8 (67.6) |
| Average precipitation mm (inches) | 96.3 (3.79) | 83.6 (3.29) | 100.7 (3.96) | 183.7 (7.23) | 261.0 (10.28) | 148.9 (5.86) | 185.9 (7.32) | 126.3 (4.97) | 293.4 (11.55) | 291.9 (11.49) | 266.3 (10.48) | 112.9 (4.44) | 2,150.9 (84.66) |
| Average precipitation days | 7.6 | 6.0 | 7.1 | 13.4 | 14.9 | 10.0 | 11.1 | 12.6 | 16.0 | 17.3 | 13.9 | 10.3 | 140.2 |
Source 1: IEM
Source 2: Meteomanz (precipitation 2016–2022)

== Governance and politics ==
=== Local government ===
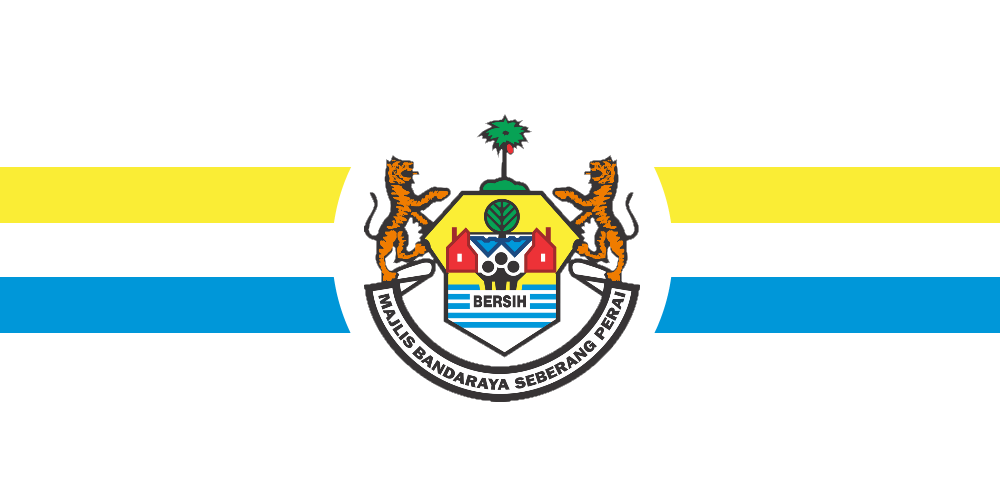

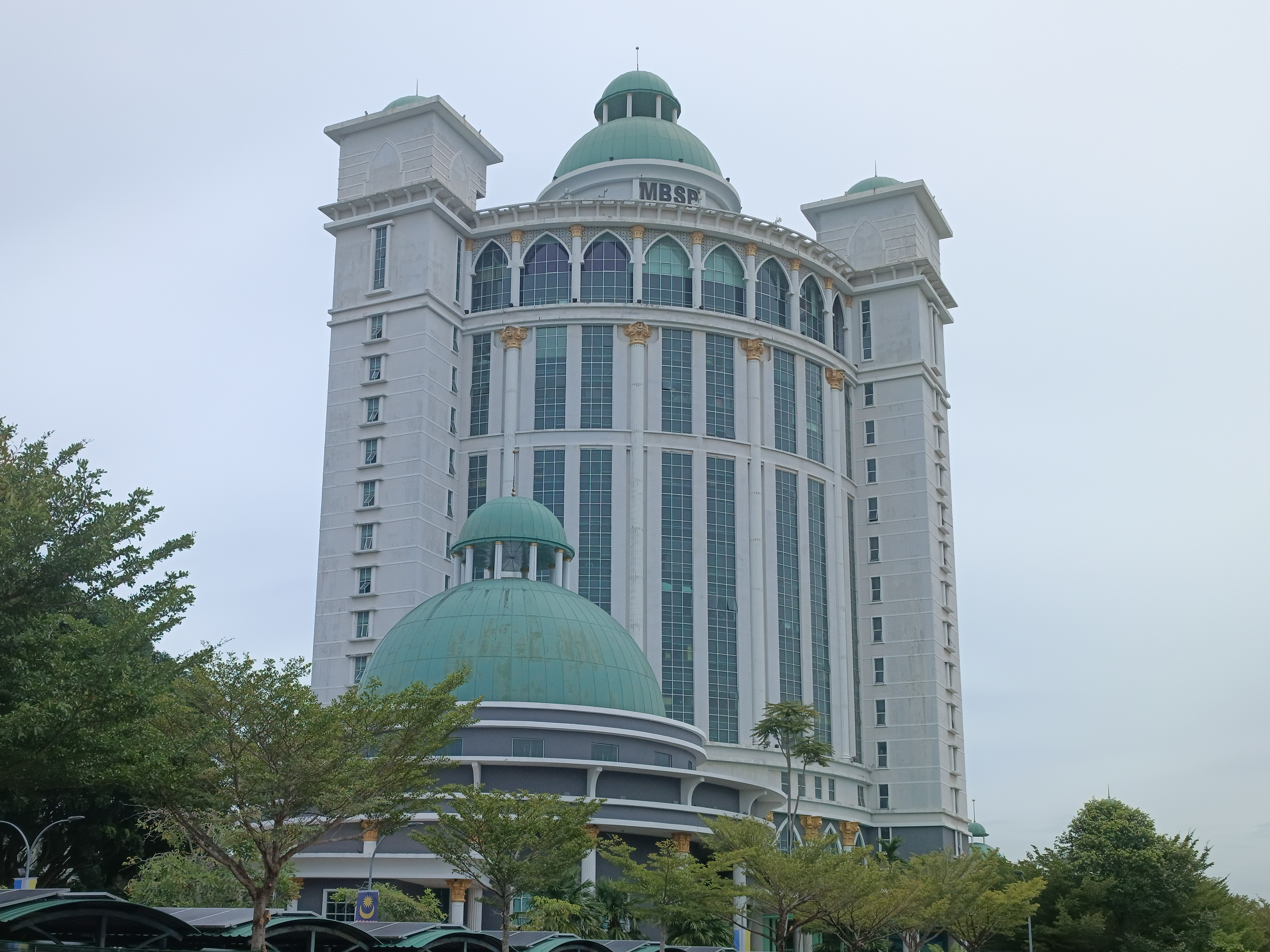
Above: Flag of the Seberang Perai City Council
Below: The City Tower, the headquarters of the city government, was completed in 2005, replacing the previous administrative offices at Butterworth.

Throughout the 19th century, Province Wellesley was administered from George Town without any local governance structure in place. This changed in 1913 when the Municipal Ordinance came into effect, mandating the establishment of local governments in Province Wellesley. Three local governments were created, namely the town boards for Butterworth and Bukit Mertajam, and the Province Wellesley Rural Board, which administered the rest of the territory.

The Seberang Perai City Council (MBSP) was formed following several reorganisations throughout the 20th century. In 1953, the Province Wellesley Rural Board was split into three rural district councils for the Northern, Central and Southern districts. After Malaya's independence, the local governments were gradually amalgamated by the then Alliance-controlled state government. The Butterworth and Bukit Mertajam municipal governments were merged with the North and Central Seberang Perai rural district councils, respectively, in 1961. The three remaining district councils were consolidated into a single municipality in 1974. As a municipality, Seberang Perai was conferred municipal status in 1976 and city status in 2019.

One of the two city governments in Penang, MBSP is led by a mayor, assisted by a secretary and 24 councillors who perform oversight responsibilities over 18 departments. The Penang state government appoints the mayor and councillors, with the councillors serving under an extendable one-year term. Local government elections were put in place in 1961, but were suspended due to the Indonesia–Malaysia confrontation and have not been reinstated since. As of June 2024, the mayor of Seberang Perai is Hj Baderul Amin Abdul Hamid. The City Tower, located at Bukit Tengah, serves as the city council's headquarters.

MBSP's current urban planning strategy is outlined in the Seberang Perai Local Plan 2030, first published in 2021. In 2025, MBSP projected its estimated revenue at RM367.3 million and an estimated expenditure of RM416.1 million, which included allocations for environment, public safety and infrastructure.^{β}

=== State and national representation ===
Distribution of ethnic Chinese and Malays in Seberang Perai, derived from the 2020 Malaysian census.

Seberang Perai is represented by seven Members of Parliament and 21 state constituencies. Prior to 2023, state elections had been conducted simultaneously with nationwide general elections every five years. As of 2023, ethnic Malays formed the majority in 11 of the 21 state constituencies, especially in the city's north. On the other hand, non-Malays were largely clustered in urban constituencies such as at Butterworth, Perai, Bukit Mertajam and Batu Kawan, as well as many of the coastal areas in the south. In the 2023 state election, the Pakatan Harapan-Barisan Nasional alliance retained 12 of Seberang Perai's constituencies, whereas the far-right Perikatan Nasional opposition bloc won nine Malay-majority seats across swathes of the north and southeast.

Parliamentary constituencies

- Kepala Batas
- Tasek Gelugor
- Bagan
- Permatang Pauh
- Bukit Mertajam
- Batu Kawan
- Nibong Tebal

State constituencies

- Penaga
- Bertam
- Pinang Tunggal
- Permatang Berangan
- Sungai Dua
- Telok Ayer Tawar
- Sungai Puyu
- Bagan Jermal
- Bagan Dalam
- Seberang Jaya
- Permatang Pasir
- Penanti
- Berapit
- Machang Bubuk
- Padang Lalang
- Perai
- Bukit Tengah
- Bukit Tambun
- Jawi
- Sungai Bakap
- Sungai Acheh

=== Judiciary ===
Seberang Perai has a judicial system that consists of the magistrate and sessions courts. Each of the city's three districts is served by these courts. The north district cases are under the jurisdiction of the Butterworth Magistrates Court, while the central district cases are presided over by the Bukit Mertajam Magistrates Court. The south district cases are handled by the Jawi Magistrates Court. The Royal Malaysia Police is responsible for law enforcement within Seberang Perai, maintaining a total of 20 police stations throughout the city as of 2022.

== Demographics ==
Historical population
| Year | Pop. | ±% |
|---|---|---|
| 1921 | 130,341 | — |
| 1931 | 141,388 | +8.5% |
| 1947 | 183,616 | +29.9% |
| 1957 | 233,234 | +27.0% |
| 1970 | 343,010 | +47.1% |
| 1980 | 432,982 | +26.2% |
| 1991 | 545,688 | +26.0% |
| 2000 | 655,711 | +20.2% |
| 2010 | 818,197 | +24.8% |
| 2020 | 946,092 | +15.6% |

Ethnicities of Seberang Perai in 2020
| Ethnicities / Nationality | Percentage |
| Malays | 49.0% |
| Other Bumiputeras | 0.3% |
| Chinese | 32.9% |
| Indians | 9.6% |
| Others | 0.4% |
| Non-Malaysians | 7.7% |

According to the 2020 Malaysian census, Seberang Perai had a population of 946,092 within its jurisdiction of 748 km^{2} (289 sq mi), giving it a population density of 1,264.8/km^{2} (3,276/sq mi). This also makes Seberang Perai the third largest city by population in Malaysia after Kuala Lumpur and Kajang. Seberang Perai is also the most populous settlement within the George Town Conurbation, containing over 54.3% of Penang's population. The city centre of Butterworth recorded a population of 80,378, or approximately 8.5% of the total population of Seberang Perai.

In the decades following Malaya's independence, Seberang Perai's population grew rapidly due to the spillover of development from George Town. Between 1975 and 1990, suburban sprawl became more pronounced within the northern and central districts of the city. By 1991, Seberang Perai's population outstripped that of Penang Island for the first time in the state's history.^{γ}

=== Ethnicities ===
As of 2020, Malays accounted for 49% of Seberang Perai's population and were the majority ethnic group in the northern part of the city. Ethnic Chinese constituted a significant proportion of the city's population at nearly 33%, followed by the Indians at almost 10%. During the British colonial era, agriculture promoted significant immigration from China and India, resulting in sizable non-Malay populations within the central and southern districts of the city. In particular, Chinese comprised the majority at areas such as Butterworth, Bukit Mertajam and Nibong Tebal.

== Economy ==
Economic sectors in Seberang Perai by GDP share (2020)
1. Services (46.8%)
2. Manufacturing (46.0%)
3. Agriculture (4.00%)
4. Construction (2.20%)
5. Mining (0.30%)

Formerly regarded as a "poor cousin" to George Town, Seberang Perai has undergone significant transformation in the decades following Malaya's independence. The Penang state government has been actively promoting a policy of balanced development between the two cities, and Seberang Perai has been positioned as the "future of Penang". In 2021, "Penang Bay", an initiative aimed at promoting sustainable development, urban regeneration and creative economy between downtown George Town and Butterworth, was officially announced.

With significant industrialisation since the 1970s, the city has been designated a "growth centre" within the George Town Conurbation. Nine of Penang's industrial clusters are located in the city, which has emerged as a significant recipient of foreign direct investment (FDI) and the seventh largest exporter in Malaysia. The development of newer townships has also driven economic diversification, with a growing services sector concentrated around retail and tourism.

In 2020, Seberang Perai's GDP was worth RM45.149 billion (US$10.836 billion), accounting for about 46.5% of Penang's total GDP. The economy of Seberang Perai is primarily driven by the services and manufacturing sectors, which together contributed nearly 93% of the city's GDP that year.

=== Manufacturing ===
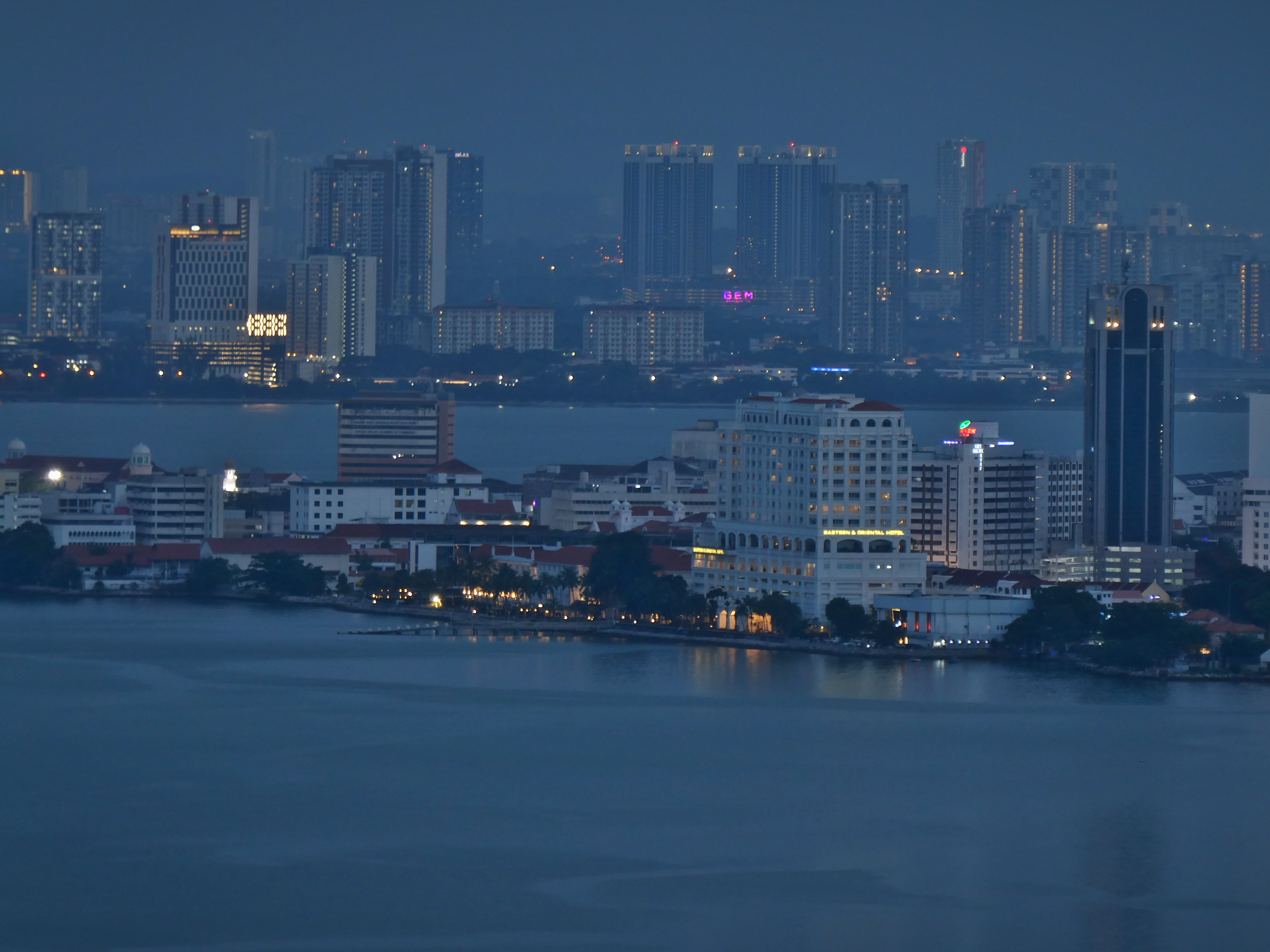
Plans are in progress for economic integration between Butterworth (background) and downtown George Town (foreground) as part of the "Penang Bay" initiative.

The first industrial estates in Penang were established in the 1960s at Mak Mandin and Perai during the tenure of the state's first Chief Minister Wong Pow Nee. However, these early efforts at industrialisation were limited to import substitution. After the revocation of George Town's free port status and the fall of the Alliance-led state government in 1969, newly elected Chief Minister Lim Chong Eu sought to restructure Penang's economy. The Nathan Report of 1970, produced by Robert R. Nathan Associates, proposed an export-led growth strategy and the strengthening of linkages with the global economy. In 1980, the Perai Free Industrial Zone was created with the aim of becoming a significant manufacturing hub for bulk items, taking advantage of its proximity to the Port of Penang and the railway line that connects it to the rest of western Peninsular Malaysia.

Seberang Perai is now home to nine of Penang's industrial clusters – namely at Mak Mandin, Perai, Seberang Jaya, Bukit Tengah, Bukit Minyak, Simpang Ampat and Batu Kawan. The availability of industrial land has attracted several local and multinational companies (MNCs), such as Mattel, Flex, Sanmina, JinkoSolar, Honeywell and Lam Research. In 2022, Seberang Perai received investments worth nearly RM10.9 billion, which accounted for 79% of Penang's total inbound investments that year. Within the same year, RM65.7 billion worth of exports passed through the Port of Penang, making Seberang Perai the seventh largest exporter among Malaysian cities.

=== Services ===
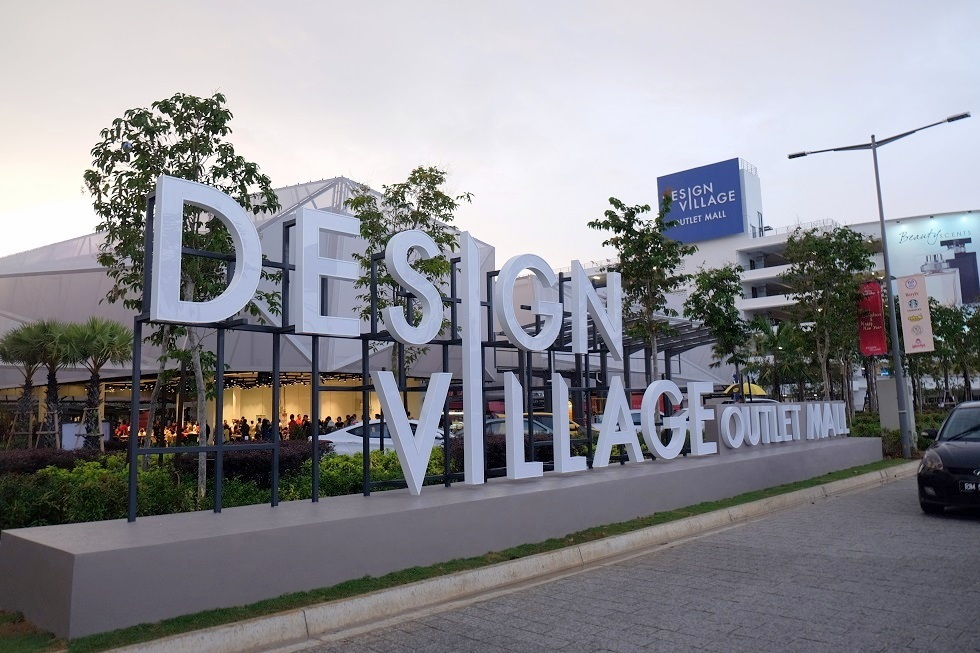
Opened in 2016, Design Village at Batu Kawan houses 150 stores within a 400,000 sq ft (37,000 m^{2}) net lettable area.

The development of newer townships, namely Seberang Jaya and Batu Kawan, has given rise to a thriving retail sector, attracting major players such as Sunway Group and IKEA, respectively. In 2016, Design Village, Penang's first premium outlet mall, was launched, further enhancing Batu Kawan as a retail destination.

The Penang state government has undertaken initiatives to promote agritourism and ecotourism in Seberang Perai. The Penang Tourism Master Plan, formulated in 2021, identified the city's agricultural sector, as well as natural features like mangroves, mudflats and waterways, as having untapped tourism potential.

Seberang Perai has historically been the logistical hub of Penang, serving as a termini for rail and ferry services. The relocation of the Port of Penang to the city in 1974 facilitated the development of new container services. In 2022, the seaport handled close to 1.32 million TEUs of cargo, the third highest in Malaysia. The logistical role of Seberang Perai is further complemented by Penang Sentral, a transit-oriented development (TOD) at Butterworth.

=== Agriculture ===
Known as the "rice bowl" of Penang, Seberang Perai has a long history of agriculture. During British rule, spice, sugar and rubber were some of the major crops in the territory. Post-independence, the focus has shifted to rice, palm oil and coconut cultivation. As of 2017, agriculture made up nearly 44% of Seberang Perai's land use. The city had approximately 12,472 acres (5,047 ha) of paddy fields as of 2008, mainly located in the north. Despite limited land availability, Penang has consistently recorded the highest average rice yield in Malaysia since 2018, with a total yield of RM190.8 million in 2022.

== Culture ==
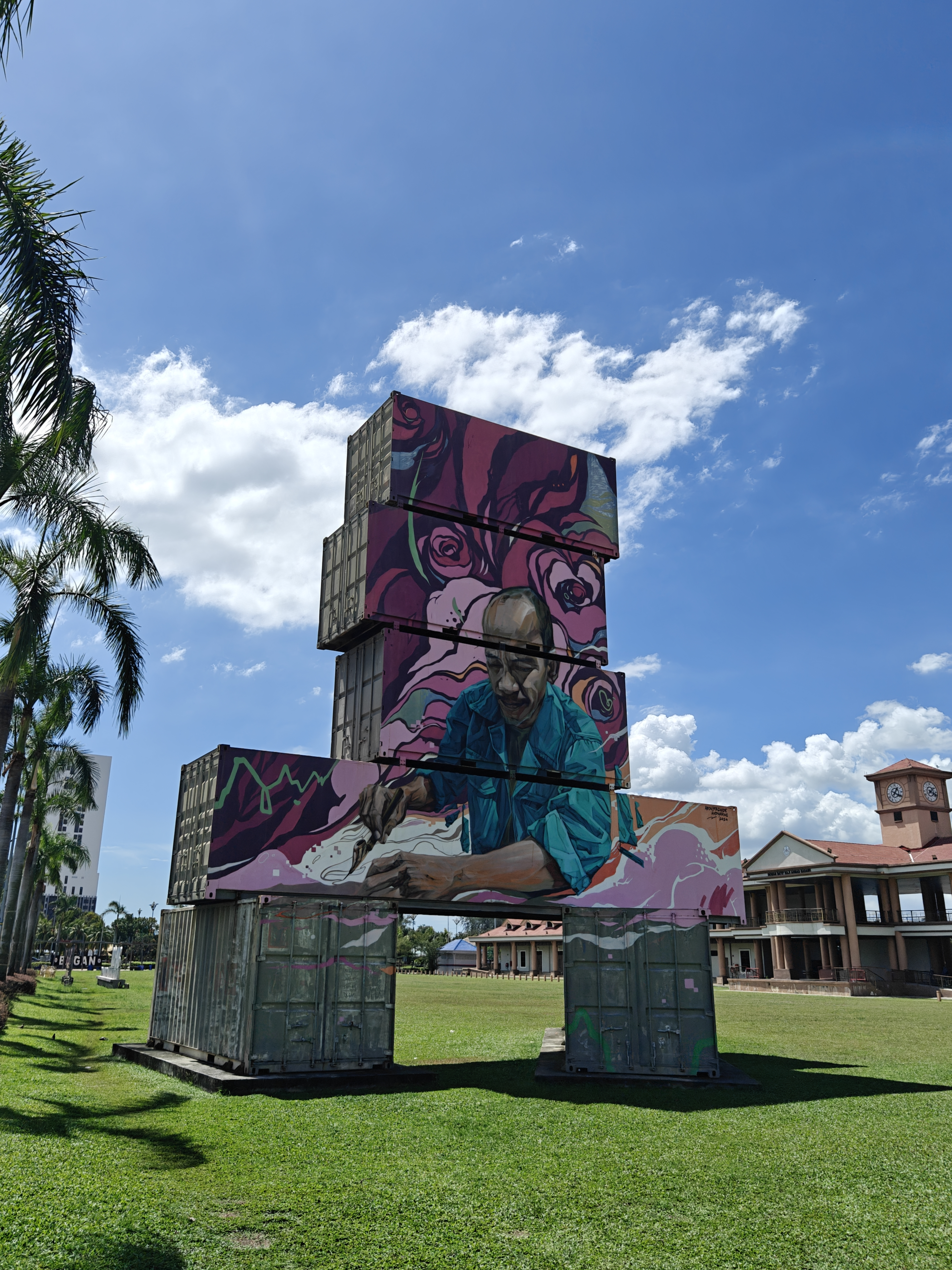
A container art installation at Butterworth, created in 2020.

Seberang Perai's ethnic diversity has given rise to a variety of cultural celebrations throughout the year. Chinese New Year is celebrated at Chinese-majority areas such as Butterworth, where public events and decorated streets are a common sight during the annual festivities. The Minor Basilica of St. Anne at Bukit Mertajam plays host to the annual Novena feast, which draws thousands of pilgrims from abroad. The 'Street of Harmony' at Seberang Jaya has nine places of worship, each representing a different faith, and is a tribute to religious diversity within the township.

As part of urban renewal efforts, several locations at Butterworth have been adorned with street art. Additionally, container art pieces showcasing the identities of Penang's local communities have also been installed at Butterworth and Batu Kawan. In recent years, Seberang Perai has emerged as a venue for newly introduced events that celebrate the city's culture and nascent arts scene, such as the Butterworth Fringe Festival and the Penang International Paddy Festival.

=== Sports ===
The 40,000-seater Penang State Stadium at Batu Kawan is the main stadium of Penang. Constructed in 2000 for the Sukma Games held that year, the multi-purpose stadium has a FIFA-certified football field, and also hosts motorsports events and concerts. In addition to the stadium, newer sports facilities have been planned in areas like Nibong Tebal and Seberang Jaya.

== Education ==
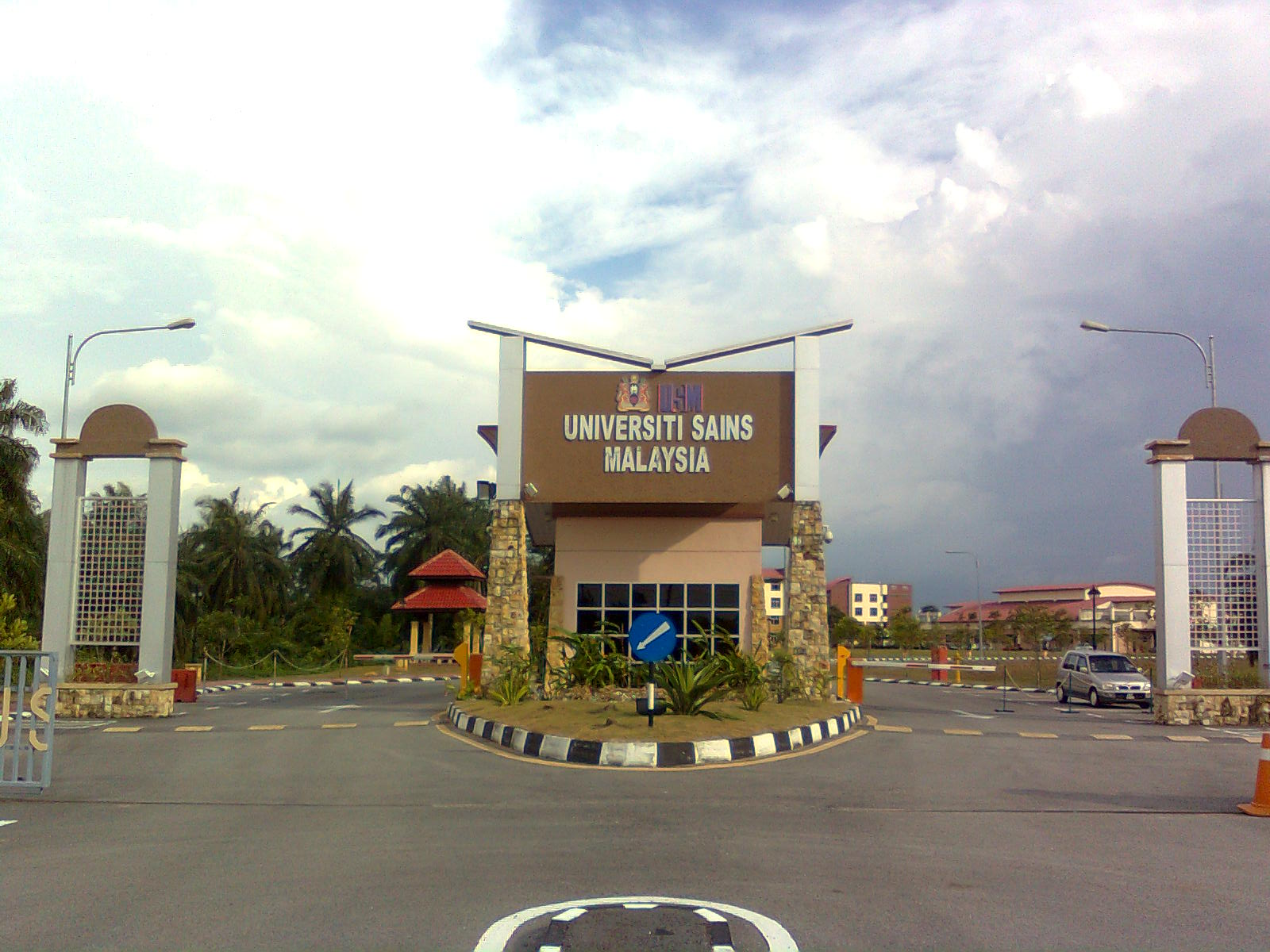
An entrance of Universiti Sains Malaysia's engineering campus at Nibong Tebal

In the late 19th century, Islamic education, taught in huts called pondoks in Malay, was common in the rural areas of Province Wellesley. These pondoks served as the precursors to the madrasa system and modern religious schools that are still prevalent across the city.

As of 2022, Seberang Perai is home to a total of 159 primary schools and 79 secondary schools, in addition to one international school located in the city's south. In 2001, Universiti Sains Malaysia relocated its engineering campus to Nibong Tebal, and it is now one of the two public universities in the city, the other being a Universiti Teknologi MARA campus at Permatang Pauh. Several private institutions have also been established throughout the city, including at Batu Kawan, where local colleges have formed partnerships with foreign universities such as University of Wollongong and University of Plymouth. Following the success of the Penang Digital Library in George Town, the Penang state government has initiated the construction of similar digital libraries at Butterworth and Bukit Mertajam.

== Healthcare ==
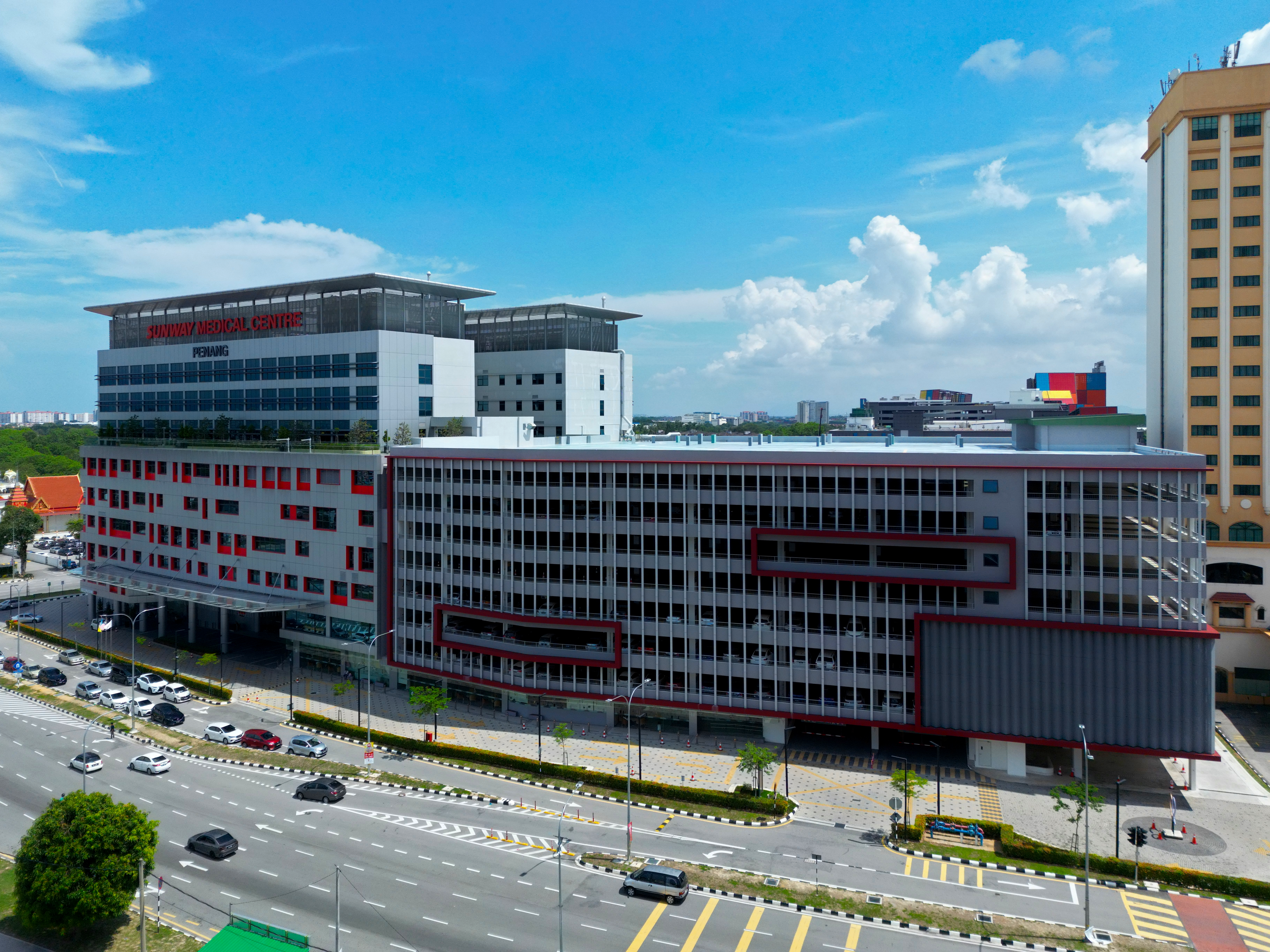
Sunway Medical Centre, a private hospital at Seberang Jaya, was opened in 2022.

Healthcare in Penang is provided by a two-tier system consisting of public and private hospitals. The Malaysian Ministry of Health administers four public hospitals in Seberang Perai – namely at Kepala Batas, Seberang Jaya, Bukit Mertajam and Sungai Bakap. In addition, six private hospitals are scattered throughout the city.

In recent years, private hospitals such as Bagan Specialist Centre, Sunway Medical Centre and KPJ Penang Specialist Hospital have contributed significantly in making Penang the top destination for medical tourism in Malaysia. The Seberang Perai City Council has also installed three automated external defibrillators (AEDs) throughout the city as of 2023 as part of a state-wide initiative to enhance survival rates of cardiac arrest cases.

== Transportation ==
=== Land ===
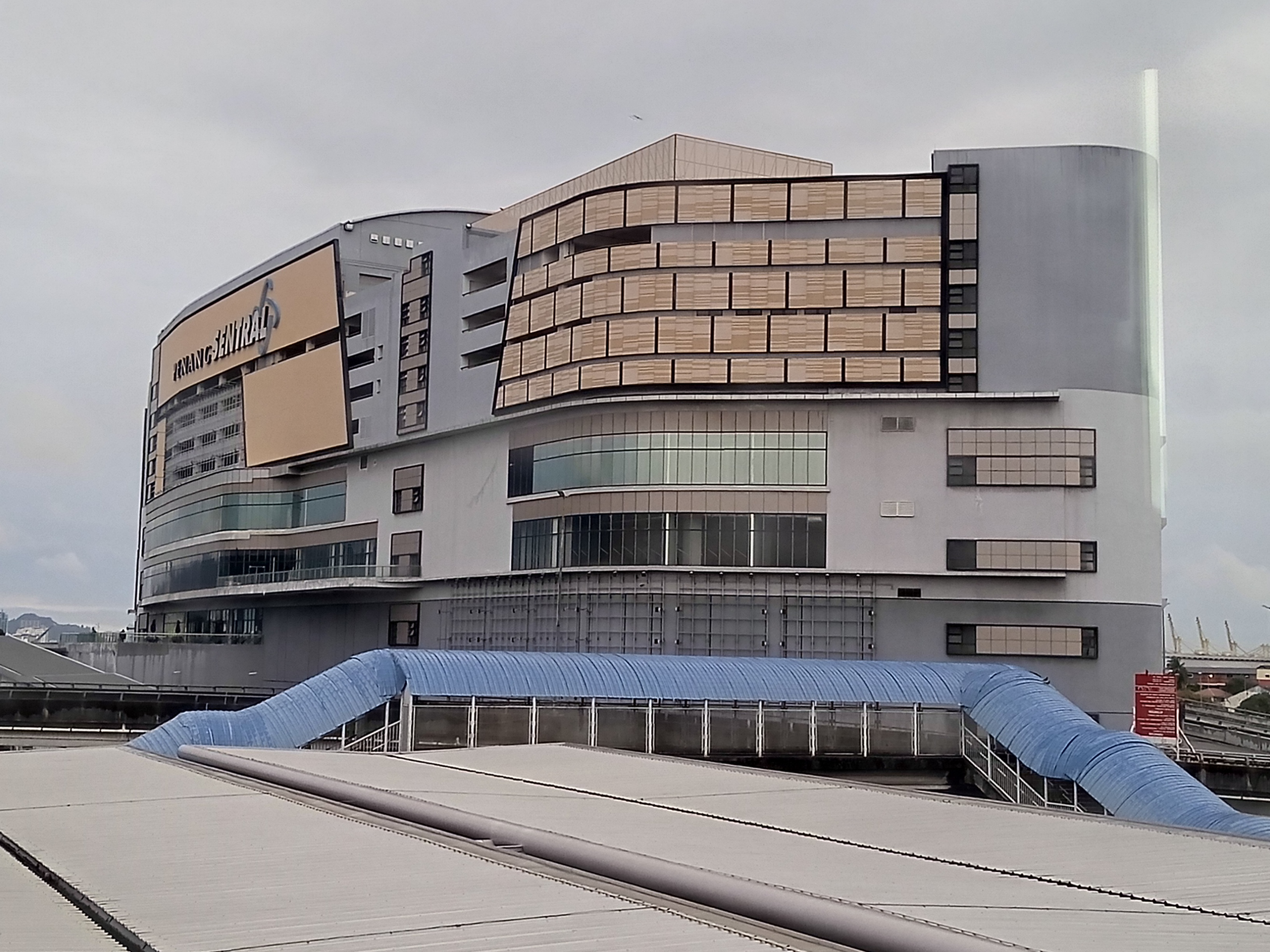
Penang Sentral was designed to integrate bus, rail and ferry services, located in close proximity to both the Sultan Abdul Halim Ferry Terminal and the Butterworth railway station.

Seberang Perai is connected to George Town by two road bridges. The 13.5 km (8.4 mi) Penang Bridge connects the suburb of Perai with Gelugor in the island city. Opened in 2014, the Second Penang Bridge spans 24 km (15 mi) between Batu Kawan and Batu Maung on the island. The North-South Expressway, a 966 km-long (600 mi) expressway along western Peninsular Malaysia, passes through the length of the city. Other toll routes within the city include the Butterworth Outer Ring Road (BORR) and the Butterworth-Kulim Expressway. As of 2023, Seberang Perai's road system, excluding toll routes, measured 5,215.7 km (3,240.9 mi) in length. This included 84.8 km (52.7 mi) of federal roads, 2,958.9 km (1,838.6 mi) of state roads and 2,171.9 km (1,349.6 mi) of municipal roads.

The Keretapi Tanah Melayu (KTM) West Coast Line also runs through Seberang Perai, with the Butterworth railway station serving as the main terminal of northwestern Malaysia. Apart from the regular KTM services, Butterworth is one of the main stops of the Eastern & Oriental Express between Bangkok and Singapore.

Opened in 2018, Penang Sentral is a transit-oriented development (TOD) located adjacent to the Butterworth railway station and the Sultan Abdul Halim Ferry Terminal. It serves as an integrated hub for bus, rail and ferry services.

Rapid Penang is the primary public transport operator in Seberang Perai, with a total of 14 public bus routes within the city, along with two cross-strait routes connecting the city and George Town, as well as five interstate routes that run to southern Kedah and northern Perak. In recent years, the Penang state government has proposed the introduction of urban rail across the state as part of the Penang Transport Master Plan. The plan includes the cross-strait Mutiara LRT line linking the city with George Town, and a monorail line between Butterworth and Bukit Mertajam.

=== Sea ===
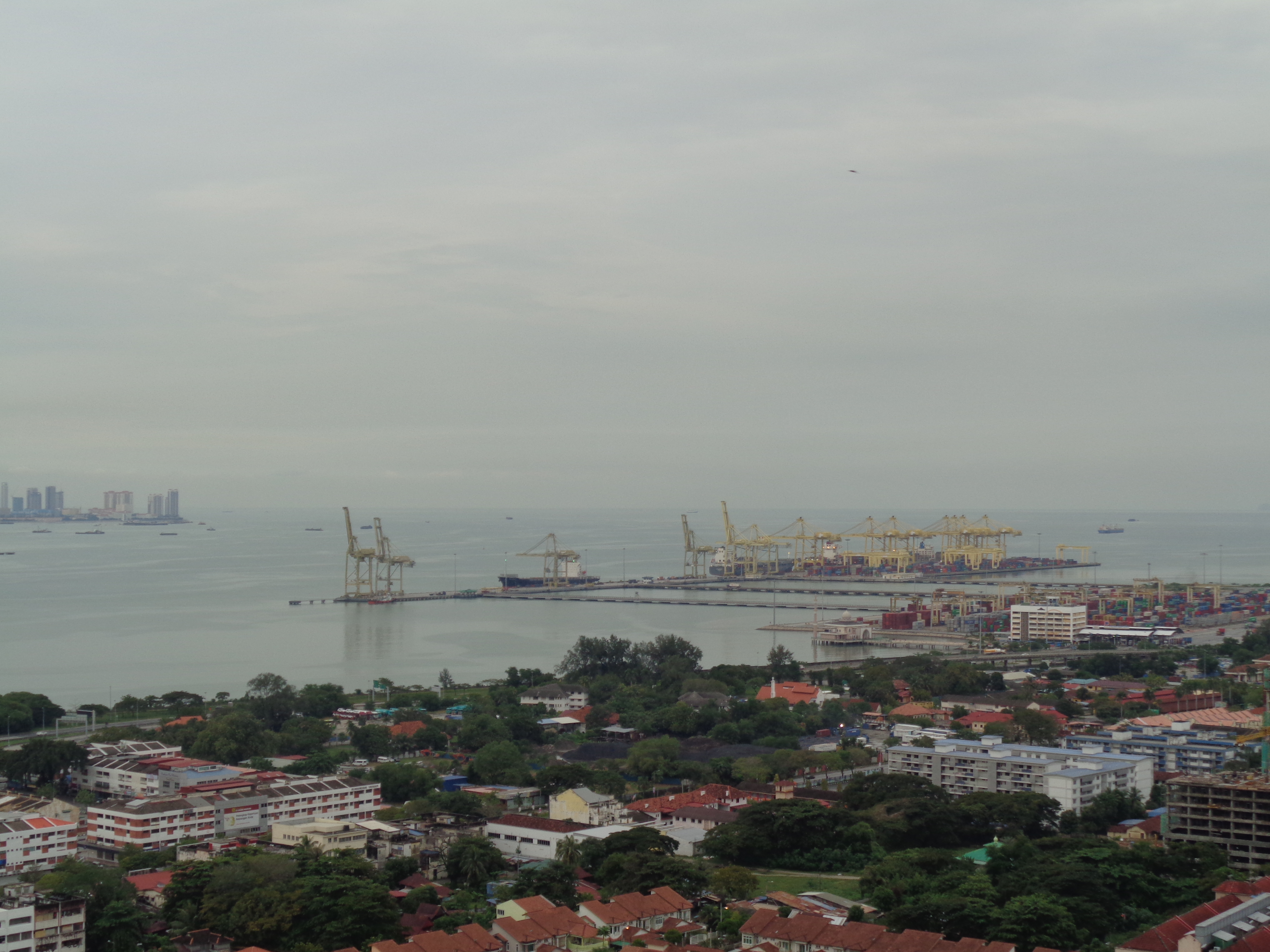
North Butterworth Container Port (NBCT), part of the Port of Penang, has been gazetted as a Free Commercial Zone (FCZ) since 2021.

In 1974, the Port of Penang was relocated from George Town to Seberang Perai in order to facilitate new container services. The seaport now consists of seven terminals and berths located across Butterworth and Perai, including the North Butterworth Container Port (NBCT) which has been designated a Free Commercial Zone (FCZ) since 2021. It serves as a crucial export hub for northwestern Malaysia and southern Thailand. The Port of Penang is the third busiest in Malaysia, handling nearly 1.32 million TEUs and RM65.7 billion worth of exports in 2022.

Prior to the completion of the Penang Bridge in 1985, the Penang ferry service was the only transportation link between the city and George Town. Since 2023, three ferries have been operating daily between both cities across the Penang Strait. The introduction of newer ferries that year significantly improved service frequencies to 20 minutes during peak hours and every 30 minutes during non-peak hours.

== Utilities ==
In 1968, the Asian Development Bank approved a loan of US$7.2 million for Penang to extract water from the Muda River, which forms the boundary between Seberang Perai and Kedah. The Muda River Water Scheme was inaugurated in 1973 by the then Prime Minister of Malaysia, Abdul Razak Hussein, which also included Kedah's assurance to Penang of the latter's riparian rights to retrieve water from the river. Since then, Seberang Perai has been heavily dependent on the river as its main source of water. Raw water is channeled from the river to a water treatment facility at Sungai Dua before being distributed to the rest of the city. The Penang Water Supply Corporation (PBAPP) is also responsible for overseeing the six reservoirs in the city, including the Mengkuang Dam, the largest dam in the state with a capacity of 86.4 billion litres.

Electricity in Seberang Perai is supplied by Tenaga Nasional (TNB), the national power company. The city's electrical infrastructure is powered by two combined cycle gas turbine (CCGT) power plants at Perai. As part of ongoing efforts to minimise energy consumption, TNB and the Seberang Perai City Council planned to replace 77,359 street lights in the city with LED street lighting by 2023.

In 2020, Penang became the first Malaysian state to require the installation of fibre-optic communication infrastructure for all development projects. 2023 marked the implementation of 5G technology in Seberang Perai, with the installation of the supporting spectrum infrastructure at 235 sites across the city.

== International relations ==
As of 2023, four countries have appointed honorary consuls within the city.

- Austria
- Canada
- Fiji
- Nepal

=== Sister and friendship cities ===
Seberang Perai is also twinned with the following sister and friendship cities.

Sister cities

- Fremantle, Australia

Friendship cities

- Gwangju, South Korea

== Notable people ==
Seberang Perai was the birthplace of prominent Malaysian public officials and personalities, including:

- Wong Pow Nee (1911 – 2002), first Chief Minister of Penang
- Mohamed Salleh Ismael (1917 – 1973), first ethnic Malay Inspector-General of Police
- Abdul Hamid Mohamad (born 1942), former Chief Justice of Malaysia
- Anwar Ibrahim (born 1947), tenth (and incumbent) Prime Minister of Malaysia
- Ahmad Fuzi Abdul Razak (born 1949), incumbent Governor of Penang
- Mohamad Sabu (born 1954), incumbent president of Amanah and Member of Parliament for Kota Raja
- Steven Sim Chee Keong (born 1982), incumbent Minister of Human Resources and Member of Parliament for Bukit Mertajam
- Cheam June Wei (born 1997), Malaysian badminton player
- Goh Jin Wei (born 2000), Malaysian badminton player

== Notes ==
^α Singapore's land mass is approximately 744.3 km^{2} (287.4 sq mi).
^β As of 2021, 1 Malaysian ringgit was equivalent to 0.24 US dollar.
^γ In 1991, Seberang Perai had a population of 545,688, larger than that of Penang Island which recorded a population of 518,478.
