= Bukit Tengah =

- Suburb of Seberang Perai
- Interactive map of Bukit Tengah
- Location within Seberang Perai in Penang
- Coordinates: 5°20′0″N 100°25′0″E
- Country: Malaysia
- State: Penang
- City: Seberang Perai
- District: Central Seberang Perai

Area
  - Total: 10.7 km^{2} (4.1 sq mi)

Population (2020)
  - Total: 54,416
  - Density: 5,090/km^{2} (13,200/sq mi)

Demographics
  - Ethnic groups: 72.8% Bumiputera; 72.4% Malay; 0.4% indigenous groups from Sabah and Sarawak; 9.2% Chinese; 3.5% Indian; 0.5% Other ethnicities; 13.9% Non-citizens
- Time zone: UTC+8 (MST)
  - Summer (DST): Not observed
- Postal code: 14000

Bukit Tengah is a suburb of Seberang Perai in the Malaysian state of Penang. This area is situated very close to the North–South Expressway. The town is within a proper of a larger town of Bukit Mertajam, which shares the same postcode of 14000.

Jalan Bukit Tengah or Bukit Tengah road, forms the main trunk road which passes through the centre of the town. This road links Jalan Pengkalan to the north with Jalan Bukit Minyak to the south, which connects major towns in Seberang Perai such as Butterworth, Perai in the northwest, Bukit Mertajam in the east and Juru and Simpang Ampat to the south. Along this stretch of road is Bukit Tengah Industrial Park, Sri Rambai Light Industrial Park and Utaria Industrial Park. Among the companies having factories in Bukit Tengah include Dell, Leader Steel, Guppy Plastic Industry and Alpha Master.

Also located in Bukit Tengah is Highway Auto-City, which a one-stop automobile, food and entertainment venue. Many outdoor events and celebrations like roadshows, concerts, carnivals, exhibitions, motor sports and cultural festivals are being held there.

== Geography ==
Map of Bukit Tengah.
Click link at the top right corner to zoom in.
1 Bukit Tengah railway station
2 Perai FIZ
3 City Tower
4 Taman Tun Hussein Onn
5 Taman Pauh Jaya
6 Taman Pauh
7 Universiti Teknologi MARA (UiTM)

== Demographics ==
Ethnicities within Bukit Tengah in 2020
Ethnicities / Nationality	Percentage
Malays	72.4%
Other Bumiputeras	0.4%
Chinese	9.2%
Indians	3.5%
Others	0.5%
Non-Malaysians	13.9%

As of 2020, Mukim 6, the subdivision that contains Bukit Tengah, was home to a population of 54,416, resulting in a population density of 5,086/km^{2} (13,170/sq mi). Malays comprised over 72% of the population. Bukit Tengah had a substantial non-citizen community, which constituted close to 14% of the population.

== See also ==
- Bukit Mertajam
- Bukit Minyak
- Butterworth, Seberang Perai
- Perai
