= Central Seberang Perai District =

District in Seberang Perai, Penang, Malaysia

- District of Penang
- Daerah Seberang Perai Tengah
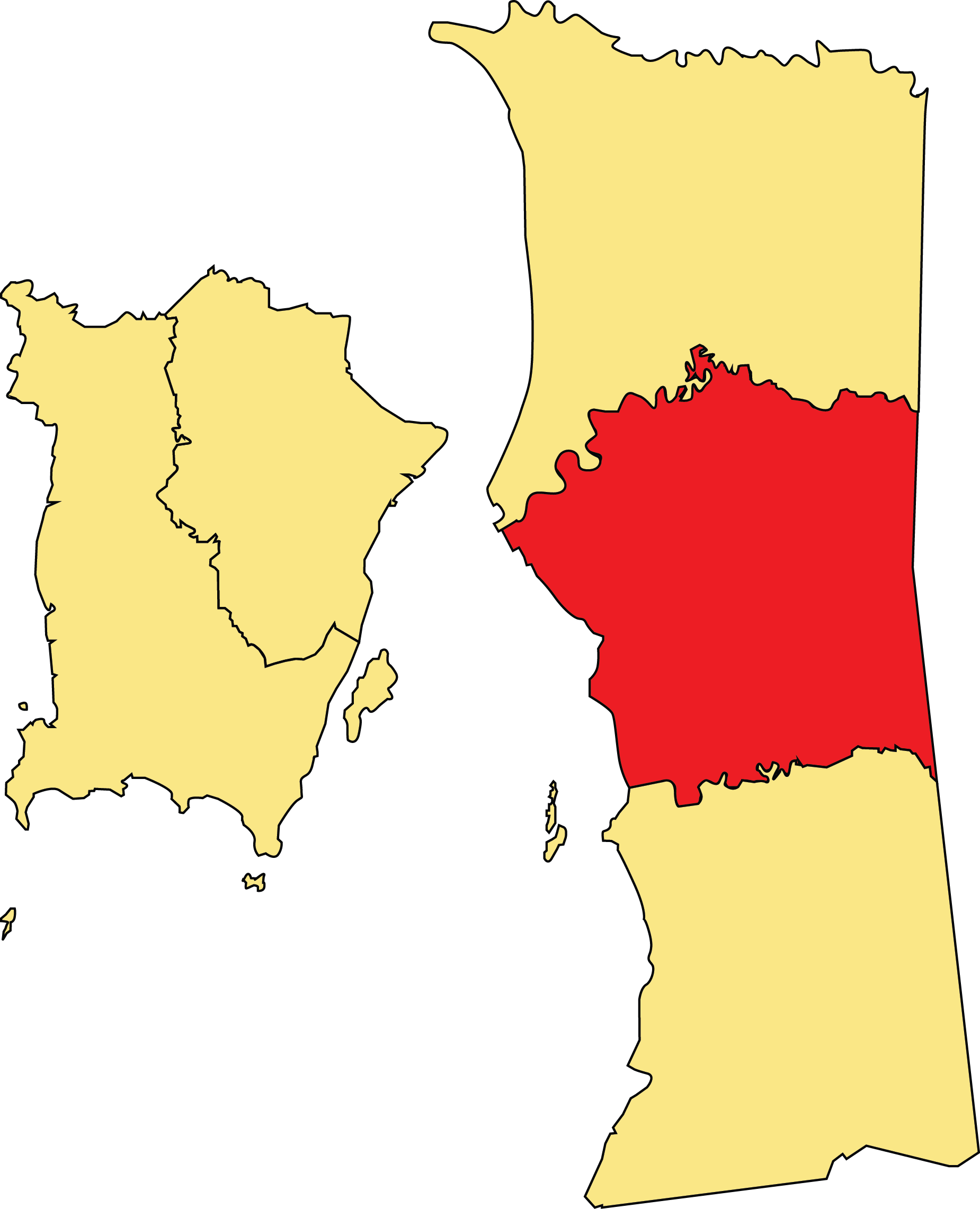
- Central Seberang Perai within Penang
- Country: Malaysia
- State: Penang
- City: Seberang Perai
- Seat: Bukit Mertajam

Government
  - Local government: Seberang Perai City Council

Area
  - Total: 238.7 km^{2} (92.2 sq mi)

Population (2020)
  - Total: 442,990
  - Density: 1,855.8/km^{2} (4,806/sq mi)
- Postal code: 135xx–141xx
- Website: portalpdt.penang.gov.my/index.php/ms/pdtspst

The Central Seberang Perai District is a district in Seberang Perai within the Malaysian state of Penang. The district covers the central third of Seberang Perai. It borders Northern Seberang Perai to the north, Kedah to the east and Southern Seberang Perai to the south. The district, along with the North and South Seberang Perai districts, falls under the jurisdiction of the Seberang Perai City Council.

== Administrative divisions ==
The Central Seberang Perai District is further divided into 23 subdivisions, officially known as mukims.

Population density by subdivisions in Central Seberang Perai
Subdivision	Population (2020)	Area (km^{2})	Population density (/km^{2})
Mukim 1	48,785	17.6	2,772
Mukim 2	5,557	8.3	670
Mukim 3	8,452	4.7	1,798
Mukim 4	12,102	8.1	1,494
Mukim 5	4,889	6.4	764
Mukim 6	54,416	10.7	5,086
Mukim 7	6,056	4.1	1,477
Mukim 8	3,379	3.5	965
Mukim 9	9,183	2.2	4,174
Mukim 10	7,354	2	3,677
Mukim 11	37,704	10.5	3,591
Mukim 12	9,881	16.9	585
Mukim 13	24,982	13.9	1,797
Mukim 14	46,280	18.8	2,462
Mukim 15	68,097	16	4,256
Mukim 16	17,312	17.2	1,007
Mukim 17	3,559	22.3	160
Mukim 18	2,605	10.9	239
Mukim 19	5,802	15.8	367
Mukim 20	13,935	10.3	1,353
Mukim 21	4,431	9.3	476
Bukit Mertajam	12,079	4	3,020
Perai	16,150	5.2	3,106

== See also ==
- Northeast Penang Island District
- Southwest Penang Island District
