= Seberang Perai City Council =

Local government of the city of Seberang Perai in Penang

- Majlis Bandaraya Seberang Perai
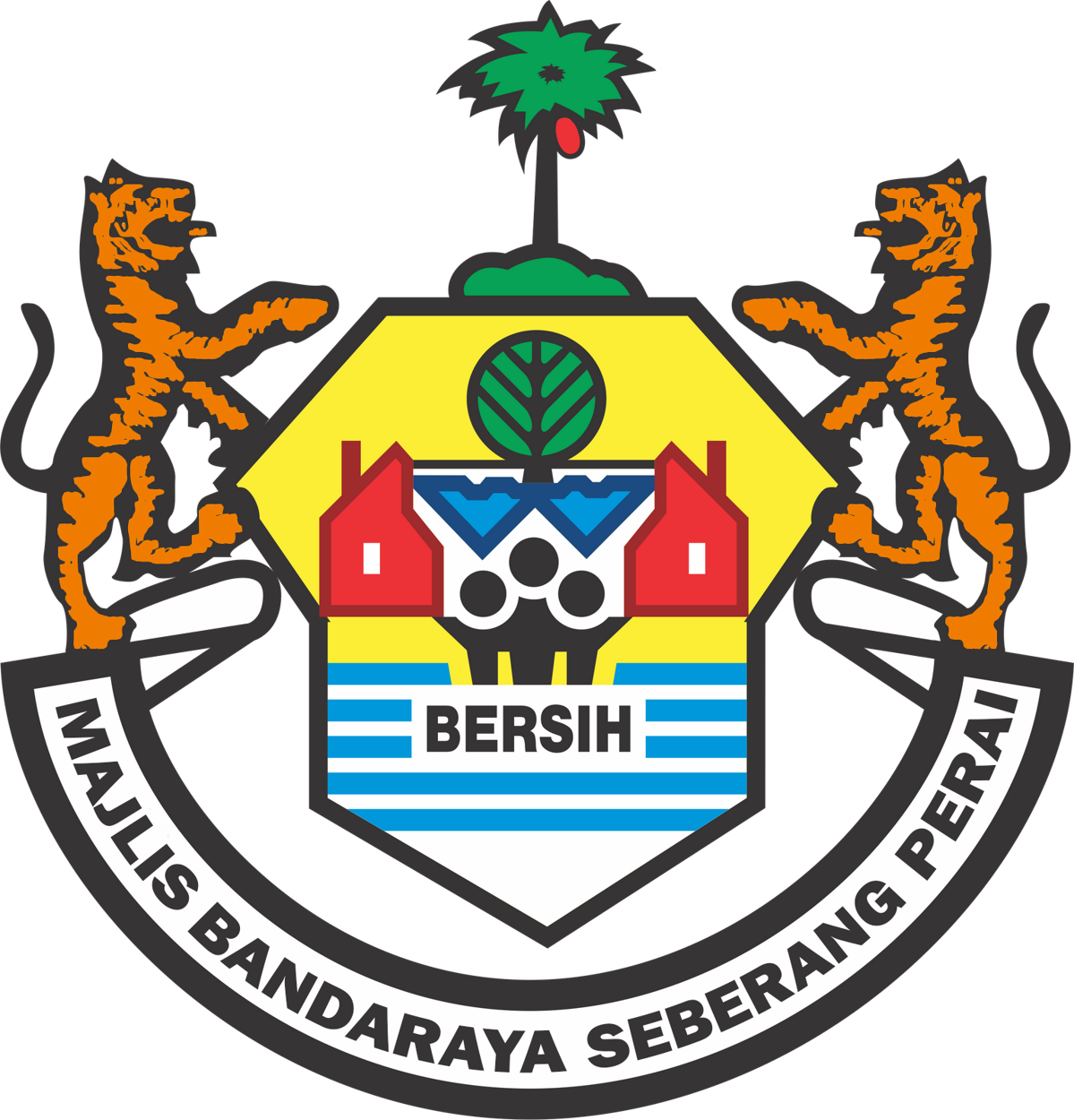
- Coat of arms

Overview
- Established: 1976; 49 years ago (as the Seberang Perai Municipal Council)
- Polity: Seberang Perai
- Leader: Mayor Hj Baderul Amin Abdul Hamid (since 2024)
- Appointed by: Chief Minister Chow Kon Yeow
- Responsible to: Penang state government
- Annual budget: RM416.075 million (2025)
- Headquarters: City Tower; Jalan Perda Utama, Bukit Tengah; Seberang Perai
- Website: www.mbsp.gov.my/index.php/en/

The Seberang Perai City Council (abbrev. MBSP) is the local government that administers the city of Seberang Perai, which encompasses the mainland half of the Malaysian state of Penang. The city council, which has jurisdiction over an area of 748 km^{2} (289 sq mi), falls under the purview of the Penang state government.

The Seberang Perai City Council is responsible for urban planning, heritage preservation, public health, sanitation, waste management, traffic management, environmental protection, building control, social and economic development, and general maintenance of urban infrastructure throughout Seberang Perai. The City Tower, located at Bukit Tengah, serves as the headquarters of the city government.

== History ==
Province Wellesley (now Seberang Perai) was acquired in stages by the British East India Company in the early 19th century. The principal town within Province Wellesley, Butterworth, began to develop sometime in the 1850s.

However, the history of local governance in Seberang Perai only began in earnest towards the end of the 19th century. In 1896, the first Municipal Ordinance was introduced to ensure the smooth administration of Penang's local authorities. Another legislation was passed in 1913, permitting the establishment of three Rural Boards and a Town Board within Province Wellesley.

The four local authorities were:

- Butterworth Town Board
- Province Wellesley North Rural District Board
- Province Wellesley Central Rural District Board
- Province Wellesley South Rural District Board

The evolution of the local governments in Province Wellesley continued in 1952, when the four local boards were upgraded into local councils. These upgrades took effect within the following year. In addition, the Bukit Mertajam Town Council was formed in 1953, thus increasing the total number of local authorities in Province Wellesley to five. The five local authorities at the time were:

- Butterworth Town Council
- Bukit Mertajam Town Council
- Province Wellesley North Rural District Council
- Province Wellesley Central Rural District Council
- Province Wellesley South Rural District Council

In 1961, both the Butterworth and Bukit Mertajam town councils were merged with their surrounding rural councils, the Province Wellesley North and Central rural councils, respectively. From 1973, the remaining three Rural District Councils were temporarily administered by a single local authority, the Board of Management, Local Government of Province Wellesley (Lembaga Pengurusan Kerajaan Tempatan Seberang Perai).

Following the enactment of the Local Government Act 1976, the Board of Management was succeeded by the Municipal Council of Province Wellesley (Majlis Perbandaran Seberang Perai). At that point, the municipal council's jurisdiction covered an area of over 748 km^{2} (289 sq mi), encompassing all of Seberang Perai and a few offshore islets, making it the largest municipal council in Malaysia in terms of land size.

From 1976, the Seberang Perai Municipal Council was one of the only two local governments in Penang, alongside the then Penang Island Municipal Council. Seberang Perai was granted city status in 2019.

== List of mayors ==
#	Mayor	Term start	Term end	Ref.
1	Rozali Mohamud	16 September 2019	31 December 2021	
2	Azhar Arshad	1 January 2022	23 June 2024	
3	Hj Baderul Amin Abdul Hamid	26 June 2024	Incumbent	

== Organisation ==
The City Council is headed by the Mayor, who is assisted by a City Secretary and 24 councillors. The Mayor's term lasts for two years, while each of the 24 councillors is appointed for a one-year term by the Penang state government.

21 of the councillors are selected by the component parties of the ruling Pakatan Harapan coalition. Of these, ten are appointed by the Democratic Action Party (DAP), nine by the People's Justice Party (PKR), and two each from the National Trust Party (Amanah) and United Malays National Organisation (UMNO). Penang-based non-governmental organisations (NGOs) are allocated the remaining one councillor positions to allow for the participation in policy-making by Penang's civil societies.

The current mayor of the Seberang Perai City Council is Hj Baderul Amin Abdul Hamid, who assumed office in 2024.

=== Councillors ===
As of January 2025, the councillors of the Seberang Perai City Council are as listed below.

Councillor	Political affiliation
Azman Rahim	PKR
Benson Neoh Kah Wei	none (NGO)
Bernard Cheen Goon Hooi	DAP
David Ng Yee Siang	DAP
Derick Chong Wei Hoong	DAP
Heng Yeh Shiuan	DAP
Jeff Ngoh Cheng Hai	DAP
Lim Chee Chien	PKR
Lim Eng Nam	PKR
Linggeswaran Charmar	DAP
Mohamad Aisamuddin Mohamad Kaman	PKR
Mohd Noor Ahmad	UMNO
Muhamad Suzuki Ahmad	Amanah
Nur Aishah Zainol	PKR
Omar Haji Abdul Hamid	UMNO
Ooi Yong Wooi	DAP
Ponnudurai Anthony Srinvasagam	DAP
Predeeb Kumar Kalidass	PKR
Rachel Teh Chuann Yien	DAP
Victor Ng Wai Leong	DAP
Yeoh Kim Kim	PKR
Zainuddin Mohamed	PKR
Zulkiply Ishak	Amanah
Zulkifli Md Yusop	PKR

=== Departments ===
The City Council also comprises the following departments and units.

Department	Director
Building Commissioner	Zulhisyam Abdul
Building Department	Noorhanis Noordin
Community Relations	Norhayati Sulaiman
Corporate and International Relations	Wan Junaidy Yahaya
Crisis Management	Mohammad Aidil Samsuri
Enforcement Directorate	Nazri Abdul Wahab
Engineering	Mohd Syukri Said
Finance	Shahrulnizad Abd Razak
Health Services	Sujatha R. Saravanan
Human Resource Management	Mohd Hairol Man
Information Technology and Communication	Abdul Fikri Ridzauudin Abdullah
Internal Auditing	Asma Othman
Landscape	Shaqhrony Md Yusoff
Legal Services	Rosilah Abd Rashid
Licensing	Mohd Faidrol Mohd Radzi
Management and Human Resources	Siti Haslinda Hasan
One Stop Centre	Nurvanida Alisha Sinnappan
Security and Community	Amirul Ariff Abdul Rahman
Sustainable Development	Normaira Abdul Rahman
Technical Compliance and Policy	Mohd Ridzal Abdul
Town Planning	Norliza Abdullah
Urban Services	Ahmad Zabri Mohamed Sarajudin
Valuation and Property Management	Mat Nasir Hassan

== Public finance ==
Financial position of the Seberang Perai City Council, 2020 to 2022
	2020 (RM million)	2021 (RM million)	2022 (RM million)
Revenue	258.5	304.9	315.1
Expenditure	284.3	285.4	310.2
Surplus/deficit	-25.8	19.5	4.9

== See also ==
- Penang Island City Council
