= Jeffrey Cheah Institute on Southeast Asia =

Malaysian think tank

- Formation: March 2014
- Type: Public policy think tank
- Headquarters: Sunway University, Selangor, Malaysia
- Parent organization: Sunway University
- Website: Official website

The Jeffrey Cheah Institute on Southeast Asia (JCI) is an independent Malaysian think tank established in March 2014 with a focus on key public policy concerns in Southeast Asia. It is based at Sunway University in the Malaysian state of Selangor.

JCI's work focuses on four key areas: economics, education, social progress and governance.

The Institute also co-ordinates the Jeffrey Cheah Travel Grants, which facilitate academic exchange between students and staff at Sunway University, Sunway College, Monash University Malaysia Campus and Harvard University in the United States.

== History ==
JCI was created as part of a Jeffrey Cheah Foundation gift that established two Professorships in Southeast Asian Studies at Harvard University.

Woo Wing Thye, Professor of Economics at University of California Davis and the former Executive Director of the Penang Institute was appointed JCI's founding President in 2014.

James Chin, Professor of Political Science and Head of the School of Arts and Social Sciences at Monash University Malaysia was named to lead the Institute's governance programme. Other fellows and researchers are drawn from institutions around the Southeast Asian region.
