= Jeffrey Cheah Performing Arts Centre =

Jeffrey Cheah Performing Arts Centre (JCPAC)
- Interactive map of Jeffrey Cheah Performing Arts Centre (JCPAC)
- Address: L4-L6, Sunway Square Mall, Jalan Lagoon Selatan, Bandar Sunway, 47500 Petaling Jaya, Selangor; Bandar Sunway; Malaysia
- Coordinates: 3.0650°N 101.6038°E

Construction
- Opened: August

Website
- jcpac.my

The Jeffrey Cheah Performing Arts Centre (JCPAC), named after the founder of Sunway Group Tan Sri Jeffrey Cheah, is a performing art centre located in Bandar Sunway, Greater Kuala Lumpur, Malaysia.

== Overview ==
The Jeffrey Cheah Performing Arts Centre (JCPAC) is a purpose-built performing arts venue developed by Sunway Group, located within Sunway Square in Sunway City, Kuala Lumpur.

Sunway Square is an integrated mixed-use development comprising twin corporate towers, Sunway Square Mall, an expanded Sunway University campus housing the Sunway Business School and the Faculty of Arts and Social Sciences, and JCPAC. The precinct is connected via the Canopy Walk and the BRT Sunway Line within Sunway City’s 15-minute city framework.

JCPAC comprises a 1,200-seat Proscenium Theatre and a 150-seat Experimental Theatre, designed to serve the full spectrum of performing arts; from large-scale international touring productions to original Malaysian works.

== Events and programmes ==
On August 22, 2026, Comedian Kuah Jenhan had his largest solo theatrical stage performance, titled Like This, Like Dad: The Storytelling Special at the JCPAC.

On August 29, 2026, the Selangor Philharmonic Orchestra (SPO) marked their 15th anniversary by putting together an experimental performance at the JCPAC.

Tickets to the 2026 production at the JCPAC of Puteri Gunung Ledang The Musical, directed by Tiara Jacquelina, were sold out in two hours with 22,000 still queueing online. The two-week musical will take place from October 31 to November 15.

== See also ==
- Sunway College
- Jeffrey Cheah
