= SMK Damansara Jaya =

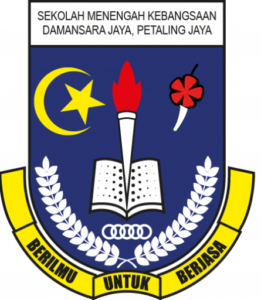
- Crest of SMK Damansara Jaya

Location
- Damansara Jaya, Petaling Jaya, Selangor; Malaysia
- Coordinates: 3.13083°N 101.61563°E

Information
- Other name: SMKDJ
- Type: Government Co-Ed Secondary School
- Motto: Malay: Berilmu Untuk Berjasa ('To Gain Knowledge for Success')
- Established: 1983; 43 years ago
- School district: Petaling Utama
- Session: Morning
- School code: BEA8608
- Principal: Aamanu bin Ibrahim
- Grades: Form 1 – Form 5
- Age range: 13–17
- Language: English language, Malay language
- Houses: Berjaya; Hebat; Kesatria; Maju
- Yearbook: Nostalgia
- Website: www.smkdj.edu.my

Sekolah Menengah Kebangsaan Damansara Jaya (SMKDJ), also known as Damansara Jaya Secondary School, is a secondary school situated in Damansara Jaya, Petaling Jaya, Selangor, Malaysia. It was awarded the Cluster School of Excellence status in 2013 by the Malaysian Ministry of Education.

== Notable alumni ==
- Heidy Quah – Queen's Young Leader Award 2017 recipient, founder and director of Refuge for the Refugees, a non-profit NGO that provides education for refugee children, as well as raising their standard of living.

== See also ==
- Education in Malaysia
- Sekolah Kluster Kecemerlangan
