= Tan Ce Ding =

Film director and screenwriter

- Occupations: Film director; screenwriter

Tan Ce Ding is a Malaysian film director and screenwriter. His short film, Please Hold the Line, had its World Premiere at the 79th Venice International Film Festival in 2022. Tan is the founder of Evil Genius Studio, a film production firm based in Kuala Lumpur.

== Education ==
Tan completed his diploma in performing arts in 2011 from Sunway University. He is also an alumnus of the Asian Film Academy (AFA) under the Busan International Film Festival in Korea.

== Career ==
Tan first rose to prominence in 2016 where he wrote and directed a short film Hawa, a story about a Chinese boy and Malay girl's friendship in a post-apocalyptic Malaysia. The short film won the Grand Prize, Best Director, Best Screenplay and Best Sound Design out of 8 nominations from the BMW Shorties, the most prestigious and longest running short film competition in Malaysia.

In 2018, Tan wrote and directed yet another short film The Masseuse which was later acquired by Hollywood powerhouse Miramax, to be developed into a feature film.

In 2022, Tan completed his latest short film Please Hold the Line, which made its World Premiere in the 79th Venice International Film Festival. Subsequently, the short film went on to screen in Golden Horse Festival 2022.
