= Monash University Malaysia =

Australian university in Subang Jaya, Selangor, Malaysia

- Universiti Monash Malaysia (Malay)
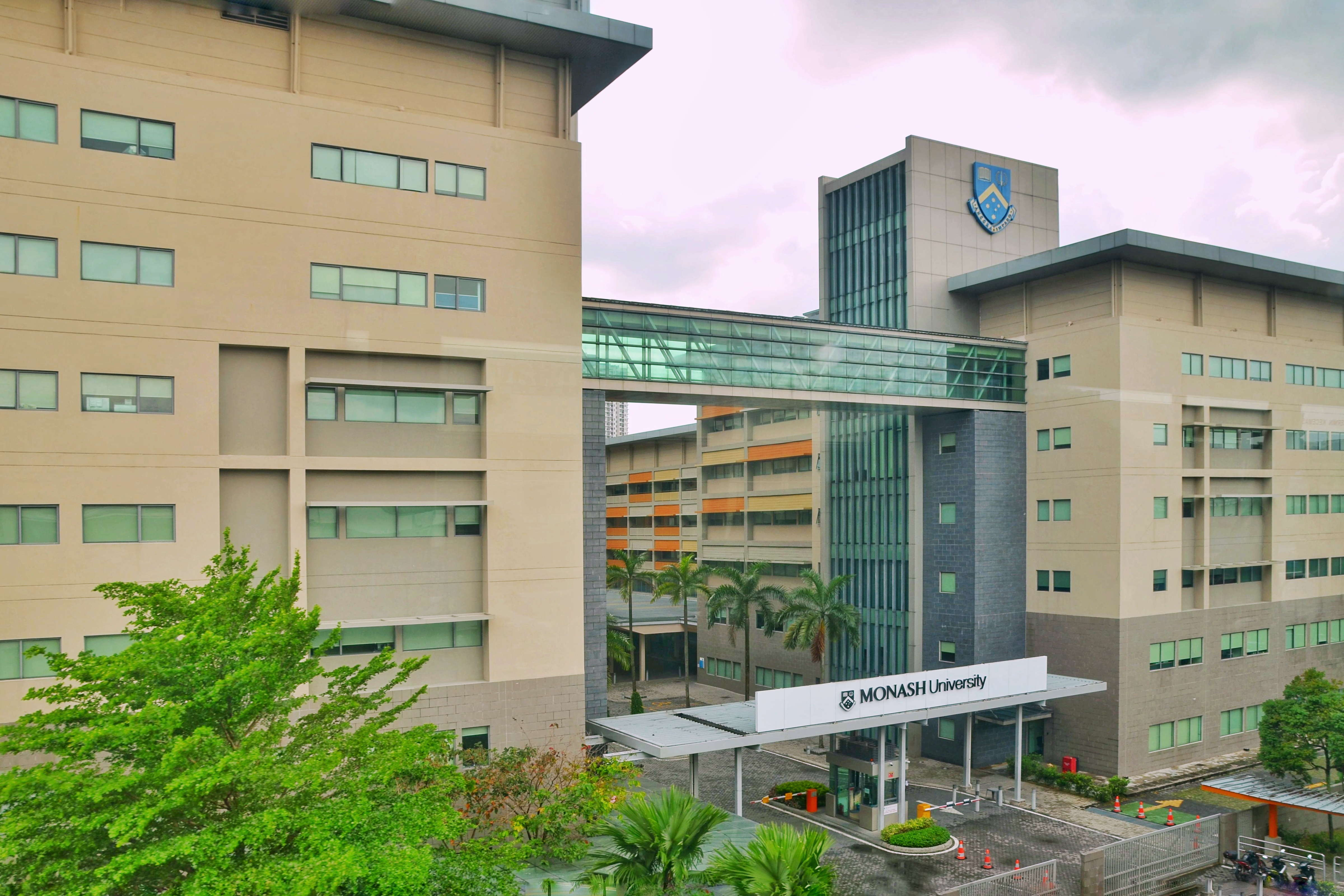
- Entrance as viewed from SunU-Monash BRT station
- Motto: Ancora imparo "I am still learning" or "I still learn"
- Type: Private; Foreign university
- Established: 1998
- Affiliations: Group of Eight, ASAIHL
- President: Professor Dato' Dr Adeeba Kamarulzaman
- Location: Bandar Sunway, Subang Jaya, Selangor, Malaysia; 3.064411°N 101.600682°E
- Campus: Urban
- Website: www.monash.edu.my

Monash University Malaysia is a private research university in Bandar Sunway, Subang Jaya and is a part of Monash University. Established in 1998 as Monash Sunway, it is the first foreign university in Malaysia and the third largest campus of its parent institution. It has since grown to be Monash's largest and most successful international campus.

The university also has a clinical school in Johor Bahru and partners with Sunway College to offer foundation courses (Note: Monash University Malaysia only offers Foundation courses (Monash University Foundation Year) at Sunway College.).

== History ==
=== Conception and development ===
In the early 1990s, Monash University established a partnership with Sunway University. Under this arrangement, Malaysian students would enrol and spend their first year in Malaysia, before transferring to one of Monash's Australian campuses to complete their degree. Demand increased for these places rapidly and the potential to expand the program was clear. Monash itself had ambitions to develop a comprehensive international campus from the beginning of Mal Logan's term as Vice-Chancellor. However, this proposal was complicated for the Malaysian Government, which was hesitant to allow a foreign university to establish itself in Malaysia. Nonetheless, as the strength of Monash in Malaysia grew, the case for a Monash campus became increasingly persuasive.

=== Foundation ===
In early 1996, it was reported that the Australian Prime Minister had been involved in the signing of a memorandum of understanding to establish the campus. On 23 February 1998, the Malaysian Government formally invited Monash to develop a comprehensive campus, making it the first foreign university in Malaysia. In July of that year, Monash University's newly founded Malaysia campus opened its doors to its first intake of 261 students with James Warren as its first Pro Vice-Chancellor. Since then, the campus has expanded rapidly. It developed postgraduate courses within a few years, and began to expand its research capacity.

=== 2000s onwards ===
On 29 April 2010, Monash University Malaysia was one of the first universities in Malaysia to be granted self-accreditation status by the Malaysian Qualifications Agency, which allows the university to accredit its own programme except those that require accreditation and recognition by a professional body.

As of October 2025, Monash University Malaysia had more than 11,000 students from 80+ countries and 32,400+ alumni.

On 28 October 2025, Monash University Malaysia announced plans to build a new 2.8 billion ringgit campus in Tun Razak Exchange (TRX) in collaboration with TRX City Sdn Bhd and is expected to start operations in 2032. It was announced by Vice-Chancellor and President Professor Sharon Pickering, Australian Prime Minister Anthony Albanese, and Higher Education Minister Datuk Seri Dr Zambry Abd Kadir. The new campus will be able to accommodate 22,500 students, 1,700 staff members and will include cutting-edge research centers in energy transition, health, AI, and data science. The campus will offer 35 courses, such as, digitisation, AI and cyber security, climate change and sustainability, healthcare and digital health, semiconductor and advanced manufacturing, and banking and finance. The campus will be funded by Monash University Malaysia and is expected to contribute RM19.1 billion to Malaysia's economy over the next decade.

== Faculties ==
Monash University Malaysia offers foundation, diploma, undergraduate, postgraduate courses, and produces research in a variety of disciplines.

- School of Arts and Social Sciences
- School of Business
- School of Engineering
- School of Information Technology
- Jeffrey Cheah School of Medicine and Health Sciences – named after Sunway's founder and chairman, Jeffrey Cheah
- School of Pharmacy
- School of Science

In addition, Monash University Malaysia offers professional development courses designed to upskill individuals.

== Notable people ==
Since its founding back in 1990s, Monash University Malaysia has produced over 32,400 alumni.

=== Alumni ===
- Joel Neoh Eu-Jin – Founder of Groupon Malaysia.
- Sim Kui Hian – Deputy Premier of Sarawak.
- Lim Guan Eng – Former Minister of Finance and Chief Minister of Penang.
- Safaath Ahmed Zahir – Maldivian women's rights activists and Forbes 30 Under 30.
- Yap Soo Huey – Former Member of the Penang State Legislative Assembly.
- Naoual Oukkache – Moroccan toxicologist and herpetologist

== See also ==
- List of universities in Malaysia
