= Kuala Lumpur City Opera =

Opera Company & Studio

Kuala Lumpur City Opera (KLCO), formerly known as "Eat, Sing & Travel People" (EST), is a western opera company based in Kuala Lumpur, Malaysia. It was founded in 2012 and incorporated in 2015. The main goal of the company is to increase Malaysians' interest in western opera music through concerts and stage productions, all the while highlighting Malaysia's distinctive artistic, cultural, and historical legacy.

KLCO has a roster of over 20 principal singers and a resident opera chorus of 40 members. In 2023, KLCO received 5 nominations at the 18th BOH Cameronian Arts Awards (BCAA) for Best Production Values, and Best Solo Vocal Performance nominations for soprano Cecilia Yap and bass-baritone Mak Chi Hoe for their vocal performance in A Grand Night of Opera.

== Background ==
Before its founding, the western opera scene in Malaysia was in a troubled state from 2005 until 2011, following the failures of two opera performances of Puccini's Turandot and Bizet's Carmen. In 2012, the company was founded as the "Eat, Sing & Travel People" (EST) by founders Danny Chen and Ho Soon Yoon. EST started off small by hosting masterclasses and small concerts before culminating in its first abridged production of La bohème in 2012 at the MAP Black Box, Publika, Kuala Lumpur.

KLCO's creative endeavours have resulted in the winning of five BOH Cameronian Kakiseni Arts Awards for its productions of A Grand Night of Opera (2022), Madama Butterfly (2018), Voices & Winds (2014), and L'elisir d'amore (2014).

In its efforts to reach out to the Malaysian community, it has held the OperaKUL festival in 2016, 2017, 2020 and 2021. The inaugural festival in 2016 was held at the White Box, Black Box and The Square at Publika, Solaris Dutamas in Kuala Lumpur on 7 and 8 May 2016. Small-scale performances took place all weekend long, along with a bazaar with memorabilia, food, sheet music, and souvenirs relating to opera.

== Past productions ==
Year	Production	Cast
2012	La bohème (abridged version, produced under EST) directed by Michela Bertagnoli, music direction by Florian Caroubi	Rodolfo (Yap Jin Hin), Mimì (Mee Mee Chai), Marcello (Danny Chen, Terence Au), Musetta (Gynger Soh Bee Teng), Schaunard (Terence Au), Alcindoro (Danny Chen)
2013	Viva Verdi Bicentenary Celebration Concert (produced under EST)	
2013	Carmen (produced under EST) directed by Michela Bertagnoli, music direction by Florian Caroubi	Carmen (Ang Mei Foong), Don José (Yap Jin Hin), Escamillo (Cipriano De Guzman Jr), Micaëla (Jane Soong, Jamie Sampana), Zuniga (Mak Chi Hoe), Le Dancaïre (Terence Au), Le Remendado (Wong Jun Wen), Mercédès (Lim Yee Fen), Frasquita (Sandy Cheng), Moralès (Tan Jong Hann)
2014	Voice, Winds and Mozart's Coronation Mass (concert, produced under EST)	
2014	L'elisir d'amore produced under EST), directed by Christopher Ling, conducted by Juan Montoya	Nemorino (Tan Jong Hann), Adina (Yeoh Ker Ker), Belcore (Danny Chen), Dulcamara (Mak Chi Hoe)
2014	Double Bill: The Nutcracker Suite with two pianos and Amahl and the Night Visitors (produced under EST)	
2015	Can You Handel This? (concert program featuring works by Handel, produced under EST)	
2015	Kuala Lumpur City Opera Fundraising Concert	
2016	Opera Extravaganza (concert in collaboration with Selangor Philharmonic Orchestra)	Sandy Cheng (soprano), Lim Yee Fen (mezzo-soprano), Wong Jun Wen (tenor), Shawn Liew (bass-baritone)
2016	La bohème directed by Christopher Ling, conducted by Juan Montoya	Rodolfo (Solomon Chong, Yap Jin Hin), Mimì (Ang Mei Foong, Jane Soong), Marcello (Samuel Lim, Chao Fang-Hao), Musetta (Yeoh Ker Ker, Ho Chi Mei), Schaunard (Shawn Liew), Alcindoro/Benoît (Chin Vun Chieh), Colline (Mak Chi Hoe)
2017	La fille du régiment directed by Amelia Tan, conducted by Juan Montoya	Marie (Jane Soong), Tonio (Yap Jin Hin), Sgt. Sulpice (Shawn Liew), Marquise of Berkenfield (Regina Neoh), Hortensius (Adam Oakley)
2017	Opera Gala Spectacular, piano accompaniment by Tomonari Tsuchiya and Soon Kun Ming	Evelyn Toh (soprano), Yeoh Ker Ker (soprano), Sandy Cheng (soprano), Tan Chee Shen (tenor), Solomon Chong (tenor), John Tan (baritone)
2017	Le nozze di Figaro, directed by Vincent Connor, conducted by Juan Montoya	Count Almaviva (Mak Chi Hoe), Countess Rosina (Ang Mei Foong), Susanna (Ho Chi Mei), Figaro (Samuel Lim), Cherubino (Chaing YiLing), Marcellina (Cynthia Tan), Dr Bartolo (Chin Vun Chieh), Basilio/Don Curzio (Alphonsus Sim), Barbarina (Bui Yik Ling), Antonio (Terence Au)
2018	Hansel and Gretel directed by Christopher Ling, conducted by Juan Montoya	Hansel (Chaing YiLing), Gretel (Ho Chi Mei), Mother (Cynthia Tan), Father (Samuel Lim), Sleep Fairy (Bui Yik Ling), Dew Fairy (Sandy Cheng), Gingerbread Witch (Janet Lee)
2018	Madama Butterfly directed by Amelia Tan, conducted by Juan Montoya	Cio-Cio-San (Cecilia Yap, Evelyn Toh), B. F. Pinkerton (Solomon Chong, Yap Jin Hin), Suzuki (Samantha Chong), Sharpless (Shawn Liew), Goro (Peter Ong), Prince Yamadori (Tan Jong Hann), Kate Pinkerton (YiLing Chaing), Bonze (Adam Oakley)
2019	La traviata, directed by Christopher Ling, conducted by Juan Montoya	Violetta (Ang Mei Foong, Joyce Khoo), Alfredo (Tan Chee Shen, Yap Jin Hin), Giorgio Germont (Aw Yeow Hoay, Martin Ng), Flora Bervoix (Chaing YiLing), Annina (Saori Suzuki), Gastone de Letorières (Heo Yueh Ren), Baron Douphol (James Long), Marquis d'Obigny (Joseph Ng), Dottore Grenvil (Samuel Lim)
2019	Die Zauberflöte, directed by Amelia Tan, conducted by Juan Montoya	Tamino (Yap Jin Hin, Heo Yueh Ren), Pamina (Yeoh Ker Ker, Evelyn Toh), Papageno (Samuel Lim, Aw Yeow Hoay), Queen of the Night (Joyce Tung Lee, Florence Chong), Sarastro (Chin Vun Chieh), Three Ladies (Janet Kan, Tan Sin Sim, Chaing YiLing), Monostatos (Stefano Chen), Papagena (Bui Yik Ling)
2022	La voix humaine, piano accompaniment by Juan Montoya	Elle (Chaing YiLing)
2022	A Grand Night of Opera, conducted by Juan Montoya	Ang Mei Foong (soprano), Jane Soong (soprano), Cecilia Yap (soprano), Yap Jin Hin (tenor), Tan Chee Shen (tenor), Mak Chi Hoe (bass-baritone)
2022	Carmen directed by Amelia Tan, conducted by Yap Ling	Carmen (Samantha Wong, Chaing YiLing), Don José (Yap Jin Hin, Tan Chee Shen), Escamillo (Shawn Liew, Mak Chi Hoe), Micaëla (Jane Soong, Sandy Cheng), Zuniga (Dennis Lau), Le Dancaïre (Wilson Loh), Le Remendado (Heo Yueh Ren), Mercédès (Lim Yee Fen), Frasquita (Saori Suzuki), Moralès (Joseph Ng)
2023	Pergolesi Double Bill: Salve Regina and La serva padrona	Uberto (Mak Chi Hoe), Serpina (Bui Yik Ling), Vespone (Eugene Ng), Lim Yee Fen (Salve Regina)
2023	Opera Gala Spectacular conducted by Lien Boon Hua	Cecilia Yap (soprano), Tan Sin Sim (soprano), Evelyn Toh (soprano), Ho Chi Mei (soprano), Lim Yee Fen (mezzo-soprano), Heo Yueh Ren (tenor), Tan Chee Shen (tenor), Wilson Loh (baritone), James Long (baritone), Mak Chi Hoe (bass-baritone)
2023	L'elisir d'amore, directed by Christopher Ling, conducted by Kevin Field	Nemorino (Heo Yueh Ren, Tan Chee Shen), Adina (Ho Chi Mei, Tan Sin Sim), Belcore (Samuel Lim, Seow Chee Chuan), Dulcamara (Wilson Loh, James Long), Giannetta (Wong Shu Hsien, Charity Goh)
2024	Voices of Our Children, conducted by Mak Chi Hoe, piano accompaniment by Dr Fairuz Zamani	
2024	Broadway and Beyond: A Musical Journey Through Stage and Screen, conducted by Kevin Field	Jaclyn Victor, Tutan Festival Orchestra
2024	Opera à la Carte, conducted by Bernard Tan	Thailand – Priya Pariyachart, France – Amélie Alù (mezzo-soprano), China – Bingxi Wu (countertenor), Ukraine- Vladyslav Demchenko (pianist) , Malaysia – YiLing Chaing (mezzo-soprano ),Foo Chen Gui (tenor), James Long (baritone) and Fairuz Zamani (pianist)
2024	Opera Si! La bohème, conducted by Bernard Tan	Mimi(Evelyn Toh, Ang Mei Foong), Rodolfo (Tan Chee Shen, Heo Yueh Ren), Musetta (Tan Sin Sim, Jane Soong), Marcello (Wilson Loh,Seow Chee Chuan), Schaunard (James Long), Colline (Mak Chi Hoe), Benoît/Alcindoro (Joseph Ng)
2025	Young Mozart Voyager	Mozart (Qahar Aqilah), Papageno (Adry Nasution), Cherubino, Papagena (Natalie Makulin), Susanna (Cheryl Chitty Tan), Queen of the Night (Irma Lailatul), Countess Rosina Almaviva (Renna Kim), Count Almaviva (Cao Yixiao), Pamina (Sharlene Rani), Tamino (Thompson Yunga), Figaro (Wynn Ch'ng), Servants, Henchmen (Andrew Lai, Isa Zamiri), Servants, Henchwomen (Maira Addin, Helen Long), Villagers, Spirits, Baby Papagenos/Papagenas (Children from KLCO's Opera for Kids and Teens Workshop)
2025	Don Giovanni, conducted by Bernard Tan	Don Giovanni (Cao Yi Xiao), Leporello (Mak Chi Hoe), Donna Anna (Victoria Seungri Kim), Donna Elvira (Saori Suzuki, Lim Yee Fen), Don Ottavio (Alan Lau, Heo Yueh Ren), Zerline (Angie Cheah, Bui Yik Ling), Masetto(Joseph Ng, James Long), Il Commendatore (Dennis Lau), KL City Opera Orchestra, KL City Opera Chorus, Children from the Opera for Kids & Teens workshop and Dignity Foundation
2025	Ravel 150	1st half (four-hands piano recital): Ma mère l'Oye (Mother Goose), Rapsodie espagnole 2nd half: L'enfant et les sortilèges (The Child and the Spells)
2026	The Merry Widow	Hanna Glawari (Janet Lee), Count Danilo Danilovitsch (Gun Foo Chen), Baron Mirko Zeta (Qahar Aqilah), Valencienne (Sharlene Rani), Camille (Wu Ji Khoo), Njegus (Brian Cheong), Raoul de St Brioche (Thompson Yunga), Vicomte Cascada (Wynn Ch'ng)
2026	Turandot	TBA
