= UOW Malaysia =

Private University College in Malaysia

University of Wollongong Malaysia
- UOW Malaysia
- Former names: KDU University College, KDU College, UOW Malaysia KDU University College
- Motto: Stands for purpose
- Type: Private
- Established: 1983
- Vice-Chancellor: Professor Dr Pang Leang Hiew
- Location: Malaysia
- Mascot: Baxter the Duck
- Website: https://www.uow.edu.my/

University of Wollongong Malaysia (Formerly known as KDU University College) is a private university in Malaysia, with its campus in Utropolis Glenmarie, Shah Alam. Established in 1983, and a pioneer in Malaysian private education, UOW Malaysia was one of the first private colleges in Malaysia to have its own purpose-built campus. UOW Malaysia offers education programs at the Certificate, Diploma, Degree and Masters levels.

UOW Malaysia is part of the University of Wollongong Australia’s global network, but has a history of providing tertiary education to Malaysia, and the surrounding regions, as it was previously known as KDU college and university colleges. UOW Global Enterprises, a wholly owned subsidiary of University of Wollongong Australia, in September 2019 acquired the KDU institutions and following a process of transformation integrated them into the University of Wollongong Australia global network of campuses located in Australia, Dubai, Hong Kong, and now here in Malaysia.

== History ==
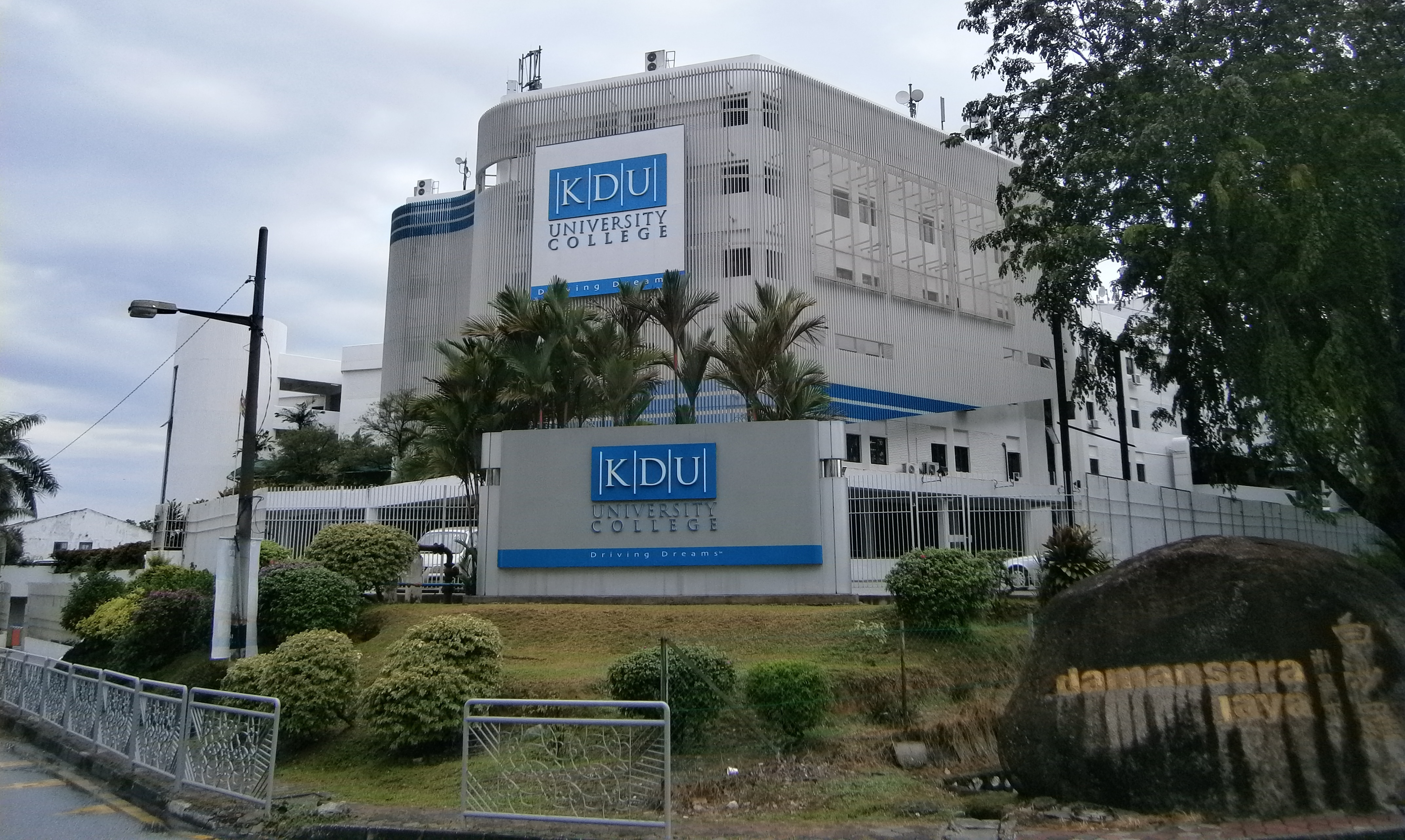
Previous campus of KDU College, Damansara Jaya campus.

Established in 1983, and a pioneer in Malaysian private education, KDU was one of the first private colleges in Malaysia to have its own purpose-built campus in Damansara Jaya. Kolej Damansara Utama (as it was first known) opened for enrolment, offering programs such as the GCE A-Level and the American Credit Transfer program, and welcomed its first batch of students. In 1984, KDU introduced the first overseas twinning program in partnership with Middlesex Polytechnic (Middlesex University).

In 1991, a second branch (KDU Penang University College) was established in Penang to cater to the higher education needs of aspiring youths in the northern region.

In November 2010, KDU College was upgraded to University College status by the Ministry of Higher Education, Malaysia, and began offering specialised homegrown degree programs. The ceremony was officiated by the Minister of Higher Education, Mohamed Khaled Nordin.

In 2016, KDU Penang University College had a groundbreaking ceremony to unveil construction plans for a 10-acre campus in Batu Kawan, Penang. The ceremony was officiated by then Chief Minister of Penang Lim Guan Eng and was accompanied by representatives from Penang Development Corporations (PDC).

Subsequently, in November 2019, the name of the college and university colleges were changed to reflect the stewardship of the University of Wollongong and they are now known as UOW Malaysia. UOW plans to develop the UOW Malaysia campuses at Glenmarie, George Town Penang, and Batu Kawan Penang into universities within the next five to seven years. Both university colleges offer programs from Foundation through to Bachelor’s Degrees and Postgraduate programs. These include programs in Business, Communication, Creative Arts, Computing, Game Development, Engineering, Hospitality, Tourism, Culinary Arts, and Nursing.

In 2023, UOW Malaysia received university status from the Ministry of Higher Education.
