= Sibrandes Poppema =

Dutch–Canadian university professor (born 1949)

Sibrand Poppema
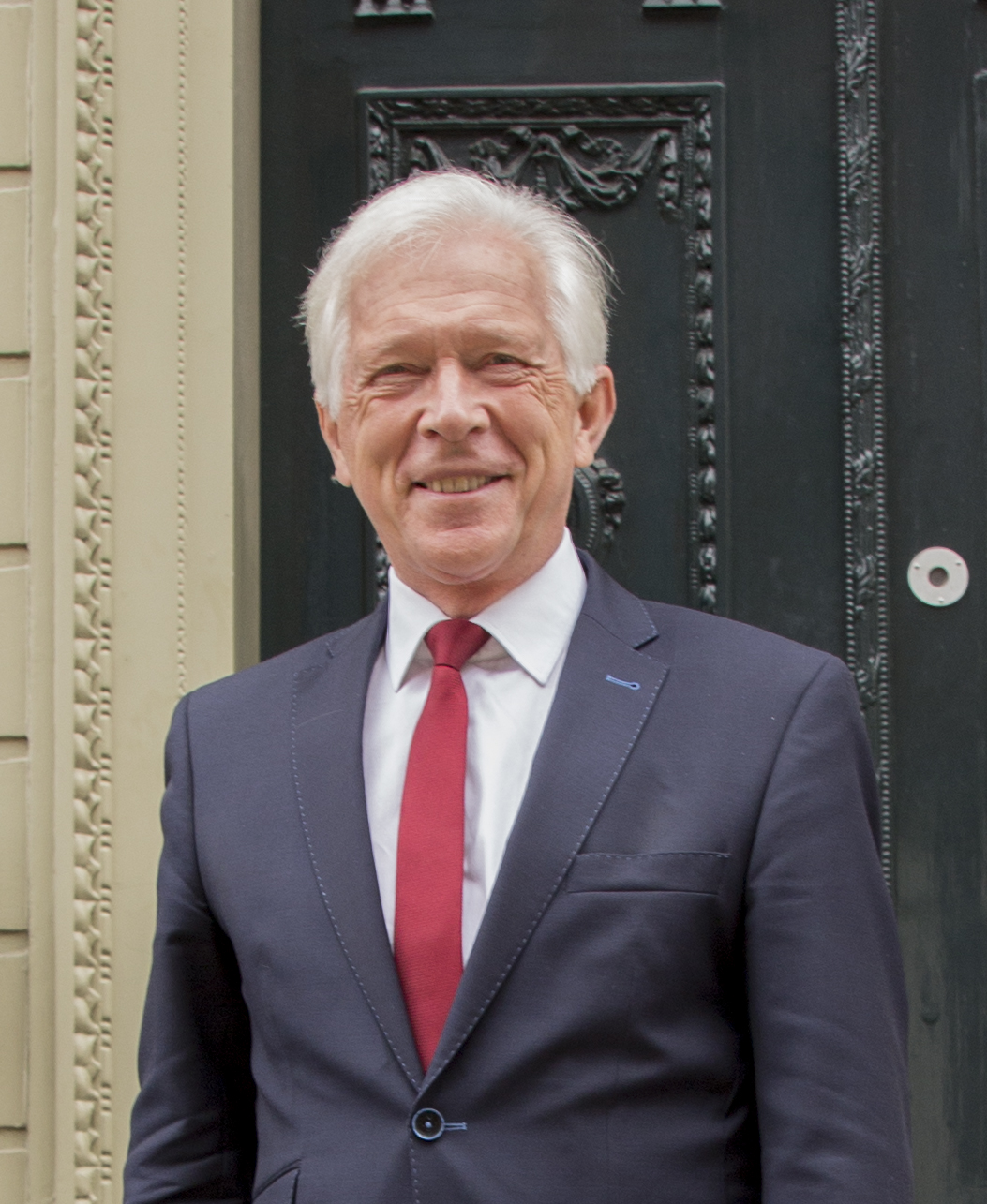
- Poppema in 2017
- Born: Sibrandes Poppema; 24 July 1949 (age 77); Emmen, Netherlands
- Education: Groningen University
- Awards: Knighthood in the Order of the Netherlands Lion; Officer’s Cross of the Order of Merit of the Federal Republic of Germany
- Scientific career
- Fields: Pathology
- Workplaces: University of Groningen; University of Alberta; Cross Cancer Institute; Harvard Medical School; Massachusetts General Hospital; Christian Albrechts University Kiel; Sunway University, Malaysia

Sibrandes Poppema (born July 24, 1949, in Emmen, Netherlands) is a Dutch–Canadian university professor and academic administrator. He is currently the Tan Sri Jeffrey Cheah Distinguished Professor and was appointed President of Sunway University, Malaysia in January 2021. He was the president of the University of Groningen in the city of Groningen, Netherlands from September 1, 2008, until September 30, 2018. During his tenure the University of Groningen 4 year bachelor study success improved from less than 50% to more than 75%, the university became the best classical university in the Netherlands according to student satisfaction and in the Academic Ranking of World Universities (ARWU) the university rose from #112 to #59. Poppema previously served as Dean of Medical Sciences and as vice-president of the University Medical Center Groningen from September 1999 till 2008. He was Chair of the Department of Pathology and Laboratory Medicine at the University Hospital in Groningen from 1995 till 1999. From 1987 till 1995 he worked in Canada as the Director of Laboratory Medicine at the Cross Cancer Institute and Professor of Pathology and Oncology at the University of Alberta in Edmonton, Alberta. From 1980 till 1987 Poppema was a clinician scientist in the Department of Pathology of the University of Groningen. In 1985 he became the first J.K. de Cock Professor of Immunopathology. From September 2015 until January 2018, Poppema was vice chair of the Dutch Association of Universities (VSNU). From December 2015 until July 2020 he was a member of the Council of Confucius Institute Headquarters.

== Recognition ==
On April 27, 2007, Queen Beatrix of the Netherlands awarded Poppema a Knighthood in the Order of the Netherlands Lion for his scientific achievements. In 2020, Frank-Walter Steinmeier, the President of the Federal Republic of Germany awarded Poppema the Officer’s Cross of the Order of Merit of the Federal Republic of Germany, for his achievements in strengthening scientific and educational ties between Germany and the Netherlands. Poppema has been a member of the Netherlands Academy of Technology and Innovation (ACTI). He also was the recipient of Medal of Honor of the City of Groningen., and of the Medal of Honor of the Carl von Ossietzky University Oldenburg. Since October 2011 he is Honorary Consul General in the Northern Netherlands for the Republic of Korea.

== Education and research ==
Poppema obtained his Gymnasium Beta diploma at the Ubbo Emmius High School in Stadskanaal in 1968 and studied Medicine at the University of Groningen from 1968 until 1974. He trained as a pathologist and performed his PhD research on the Immunopathology of Hodgkin’s Disease at the Department of Pathology of the University of Groningen (1975-1979). In 1978 he worked under the guidance of Prof. Karl Lennert at the Department of Pathology of the Christian Albrechts University in Kiel, Germany. From 1979 till 1980 he was a postdoc at the Department of Pathology of Harvard Medical School, that was chaired at the time by Prof. Baruj Benacerraf. He has published several hundred papers in the fields of Immunology, Transplantation, Hematology, Oncology, and Pathology that have been cited over 18,450 times.

== Personal ==
Poppema is married with Joke Poppema de Jonge. They have three children and eight grandchildren.
