= Jeffrey Cheah =

Malaysian entrepreneur (born 1945)

Yang Berbahagia Tan Sri Dato' Seri (Dr.) Jeffrey Cheah PSM SPMP SPMS DPMS KBE AO
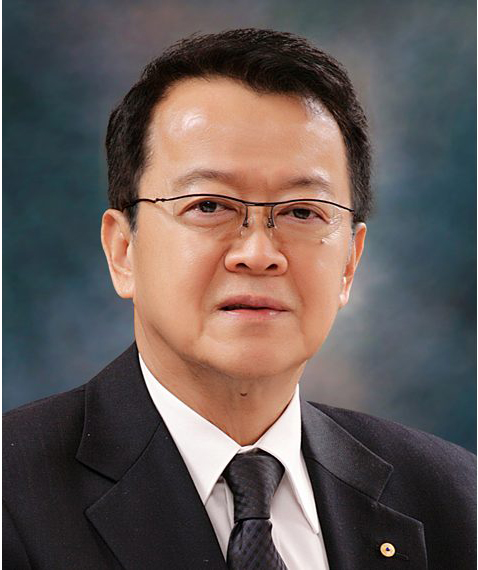
- Cheah in 2018
- Born: 1945 or 1946 (age 79–80); Pusing, Kinta District, Perak
- Education: Footscray Institute of Technology
- Occupation: Entrepreneur
- Known for: Founder of the Sunway Group
- Title: Chairman of the Sunway Group
- Spouse: Susan Cheah Seok Cheng
- Children: 3
- Father: Cheah Fah

Cheah Fook Ling
- Traditional Chinese: 謝富年
- Simplified Chinese: 谢富年
- Hakka: Qia^{4} Fu^{4} Ngian^{2}
Transcriptions
Standard Mandarin
- Hanyu Pinyin: Xiè Fùnián
Hakka
- Romanization: Qia^{4} Fu^{4} Ngian^{2}
- Pha̍k-fa-sṳ: Chhia Fu-ngiàn
Yue: Cantonese
- Jyutping: Ze^{6} Fu^{3} Lin^{4}
Southern Min
- Hokkien POJ: Chiā Hù-liân

Jeffrey Cheah Fook Ling (Chinese: 谢富年; pinyin: Xiè Fùnián; pinfa: Qia^{4} Fu^{4} Ngian^{2}; born 1945) KBE is a Malaysian entrepreneur who is the founder and current chairman of the Sunway Group, a Malaysian conglomerate operating in 12 industries with core businesses in property and construction. Cheah is also the founder of Sunway University and the Jeffrey Cheah Foundation. Through his foundation, Cheah has donated almost US$39 million to fund scholarships and educational causes since 2018.

== Early life, education and early career ==
Jeffrey Cheah was born in Pusing, a small town in the Malaysian state of Perak. Cheah moved to Australia to pursue a business degree at Victoria University (then Footscray Institute of Technology) in Melbourne, and after graduating, returned to Malaysia to take a job as an accountant in a motor assembly plant. He soon left this employment, and in 1974, he started his own company, a small tin-mining company with a startup capital of RM100,000. Today, Sunway Group is one of Malaysia's largest conglomerates.

Cheah is the recipient of 12 honorary doctorates, most of which in recognition of his outstanding contribution towards education., including one from Lancaster University in 2013.

== Sunway Group and Bandar Sunway ==
The Sunway Group grew from a gradual conglomeration of Jeffrey Cheah's business interests. At its heart is the 350-hectare (860-acre; 1.4 sq mi) development Bandar Sunway (Sunway City), a township in the Petaling district of the state of Selangor.

The development of Sunway City has won the township international awards, including recognition as Malaysia's first fully integrated green township by the Green Building Index (GBI) of Malaysia. Sunway City (formerly known as Sunway Resort City) also received the Low Carbon City award from the Malaysian Institute of Planners for implementing low carbon initiatives within the township.

=== Educational investment ===
In 1987, Jeffrey Cheah established Sunway College in Bandar Sunway as a private tertiary educational institute. Cheah partnered with Monash University in Melbourne, Australia in order to enable Malaysian students to pursue a preparatory year at Sunway College before being admitted to study at Monash. In 1997, the college proved financially viable, and Cheah transferred ownership to the Sunway Educational Trust Fund. In 1998, the Monash University Malaysia Campus was opened in Bandar Sunway, in partnership with the trust fund. On 12 August 2004, the Minister for Education granted the institution the status of a university college. In 2005 Monash University established the Jeffrey Cheah School of Medicine and Health Sciences (JCSMHS). The school offers first and second degrees in several departments of medicine and psychology and is accredited by the Australian Medical Council (AMC). In 2006, the Sultan of Selangor installed Jeffrey Cheah as Foundation Chancellor of the university college.

In 2001, the Royal Malaysia Police, Malaysia Crime Prevention Foundation (MCPF), the Selangor State Government and the Sunway Group, launched a joint initiative called the Safe City Initiative in order to reduce crime in the area. The initiative was deemed a success. In recognition of Tan Sri Jeffrey's contribution in the field of social safety and security, he was appointed the Chairman of MCPF Selangor Chapter by the Minister of Unity, Culture, Arts & Heritage in August 2008.

== Awards, honors and privileged positions ==
=== Royal orders and conferments ===
On 8 March 1988, the Sultan of Selangor made Jeffrey Cheah a Knight Commander of the Order of the Crown of Selangor (Malay: Dato' Paduka Mahkota Selangor, DPMS), which entitles its holder to the title Dato'.

In 1995, Jeffrey Cheah was made a Justice of the Peace (JP) by the Sultan of Terengganu. The appointment is purely honorary.

In April 1996, the Sultan of Perak, Jeffrey Cheah's home state, made him a Knight Grand Commander of the Order of the Crown of Perak (Malay: Dato' Seri Paduka Mahkota Perak, SPMP), which entitles its holder to the title Dato' Seri.

On 1 June 1996, the Yang di-Pertuan Agong ('King of Malaysia') awarded Cheah Commander of the Order of Loyalty to the Crown of Malaysia (Malay: Panglima Setia Mahkota Malaysia, PSM), which entitles its holder to the title Tan Sri.

On 10 July 2008, Jeffrey Cheah was made an Honorary Officer of the Order of Australia (AO) for "service to Australia–Malaysia bilateral relations, particularly tertiary education through the development of collaborative student transfer programs and the establishment of a Monash University campus in Malaysia".

In 2023, he was awarded an Honorary Knight Commander of the Order of the British Empire (KBE) from the British Government for services to higher education, the National Health Service, and philanthropy.

On 11 December 2025, the Sultan of Selangor conferred Jeffrey Cheah a Knight Grand Commander of the Order of the Crown of Selangor (Malay: Seri Paduka Mahkota Selangor, SPMS), which entitles its holder to the title Dato' Seri.

=== Honorary doctorates ===
Jeffrey Cheah has been awarded the following ten honorary doctorates, by universities in Australia, the United States, United Kingdom and Malaysia.

Year	University	Award
1993	Victoria University, Australia	Doctor of the University
1994	Flinders University, South Australia	Doctor of the University
1994	University of Western Australia	Doctor of Education
1994	Western Michigan University, United States	Doctor of Education
1995	Monash University, Victoria, Australia	Doctor of Laws
1996	Leicester University, United Kingdom	Doctor of Laws
1998	Oxford Brookes University, United Kingdom	Doctor of Education
2001	Greenwich University, United Kingdom	Doctor of Business Administration
2013	Lancaster University, United Kingdom	Doctor of Laws
2016	University of Malaya, Malaysia	Doctor of Education

=== Government advisor positions ===
1. Director, National Productivity Centre, appointed by the Minister of Trade (1990).
2. Chairman, Malaysian Industry-Government High Technology for Construction and Housing (MIGHT), appointed by the Prime Minister (1995).
3. Executive Council Member, Malaysian Tourism Action Council, appointed by the Minister of Tourism (1996).
4. Council Member, Higher Education Council of Malaysia, appointed by the Minister of Education (1996).
5. Council Member, Financial Reporting Foundation, appointed by the Minister of Finance (1997).

=== Social and welfare organisations ===
1. President, Malaysian Hakka Association (1997).
2. Founding Trustee, Malaysian Liver Foundation (1999).
3. Honorary chairman, Sin Chew Foundation (2000).
4. Vice-President, National Kidney Foundation of Malaysia (2002).
5. Honorary Member, Kuala Lumpur Malay Chamber of Commerce (2002).
6. Fellow Benefactor, University of Cambridge (2015).

=== Places named after Jeffrey Cheah ===
- Jeffrey Cheah Institute on Southeast Asia, Sunway University
- Jeffrey Cheah School of Medicine and Health Sciences, Monash University Malaysia Campus
- Jeffrey Cheah Hall, Level 4, Sunway College
- Kompleks Tan Sri Jeffrey Cheah, SJK (C) Chee Wen, Selangor
- Jeffrey Cheah Biomedical Centre, University of Cambridge
- Jeffrey Cheah Performing Arts Centre (JCPAC), Sunway University
