= Damansara Jaya =

- Township

Other transcription(s)
  - Jawi: دامنسارا جاي
  - Chinese: 白沙罗卫星市 (Simplified) 白沙羅衛星市 (Traditional)
  - Tamil: டாமன்சாரா ஜெயா
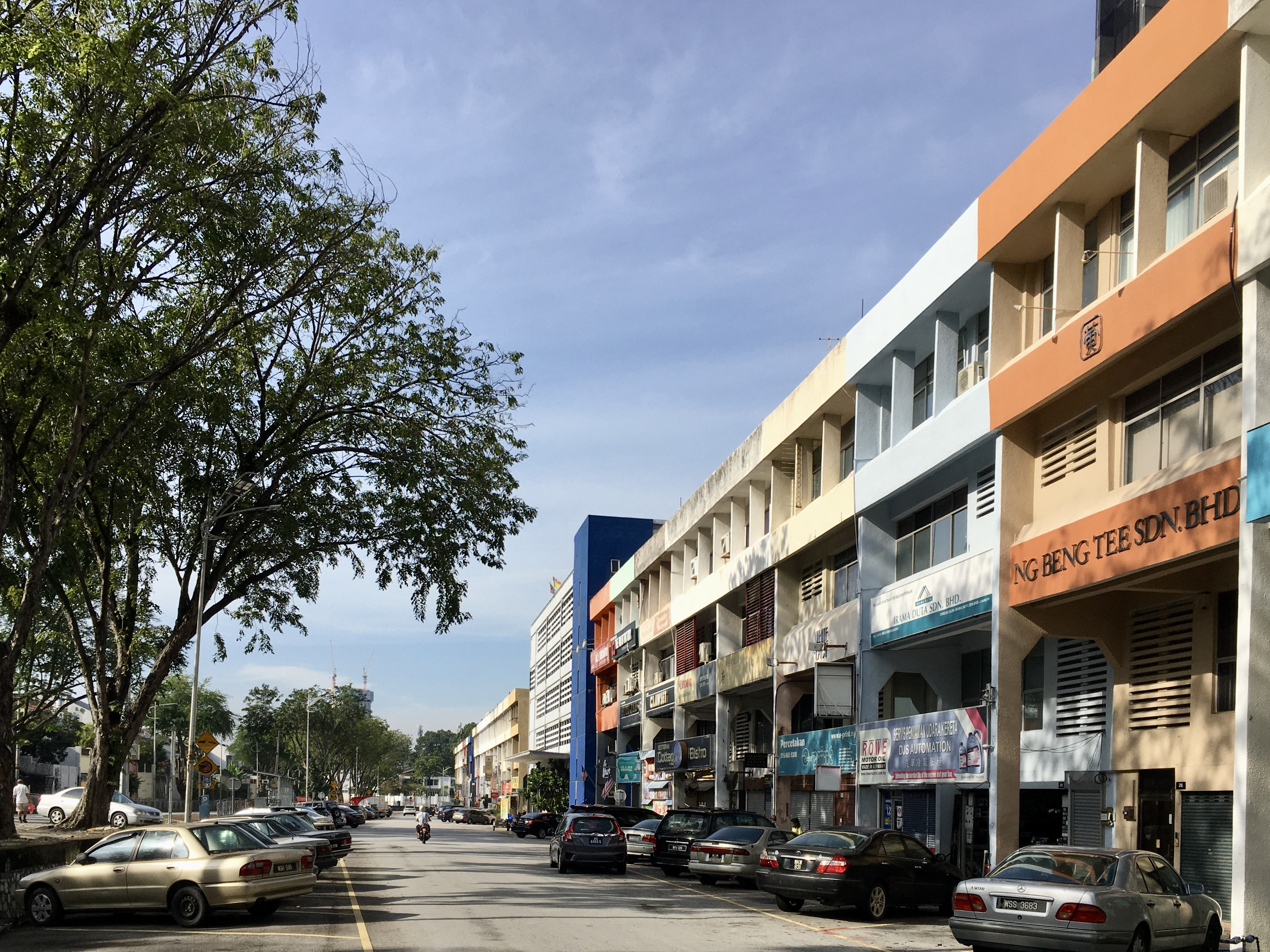
- Nickname: DJ
- Interactive map of Damansara Jaya
- Location of Damansara Jaya in Malaysia Damansara Jaya (Peninsular Malaysia) Damansara Jaya (Malaysia) Damansara Jaya (Southeast Asia)
- Coordinates: 3°7′39.4″N 101°37′21.95″E
- Country: Malaysia
- State: Selangor
- District: Petaling
- City: Petaling Jaya
- Established: 1975

Government
  - Body: Petaling Jaya City Council
- Demonym: DJian
- Time zone: UTC+8 (MST)
  - Summer (DST): UTC+8 (Not observed)
- Postal code: 47400
- Area code(s): +603 (landline only)
- Vehicle registration: B (for all vehicles except taxis); HB (for taxis only)

Damansara Jaya is a township in Petaling Jaya, Petaling District, Selangor, Malaysia, situated in the Sungai Buloh mukim. Consisting of Section SS22 and SS22A, it covers an estimated area of 1.21 km^{2} (0.47 sq mi) and has an estimated population of 12,000 residents. In 2001, its recorded population was 8,450 residents.

The township consists of almost 2000 residential dwellings consisting of 1538 units of terraced houses, 179 semi-detached housing units, and 42 bungalows, alongside a main commercial area. Atria Shopping Gallery, originally called the Gardenia Town Centre for a brief period of time, is a shopping mall located in the centre of this commercial area.

The demographic profile of Damansara Jaya is characterized as predominantly Malaysian Chinese, with a significant number of upper middle-class property owners. Notable educational institutions within the township include Nobel International School (located on the former site of KDU College), SMK Damansara Jaya, and SK Damansara Jaya.

== History ==
Damansara Jaya underwent development in the mid-1970s under the purview of Paramount Garden, a subsidiary of See Hoy Chan Sdn Bhd Group. Initially, it comprised Section SS22 of Petaling Jaya. Subsequently, in the latter part of the decade, Section SS22A was incorporated into Damansara Jaya, primarily consisting of bungalows and semi-detached homes. Construction activities commenced in 1975, and by 1978, the first occupants of Damansara Jaya settled into their newly completed double-storey terraced houses.

The Atria, a shopping complex in Damansara Jaya, was originally built in the mid-1980s and featured departmental stores like Kimisawa and Printemps. However, by the late 1980s, the complex went into decline due to recession. Ownership of the Atria changed hands several times throughout the years. In the early 2000s, the complex struggled to compete with newer and bigger malls nearby. Lien Hoe Corporation, the then-owner, decided to redevelop the space but faced challenges in retaining tenants. In 2007, OSK Property Holdings Bhd acquired the Atria and began a major redevelopment project. The original plan involved building a 33-storey office tower with a retail podium. This plan was later revised to a four-storey podium with two office towers. The existing complex was demolished in 2011 and the new development, known as Atria Shopping Gallery, reopened in 2015 with significantly more retail space and parking bays.

In 2007, a residential expansion took place with the addition of 14 units of three-storey semi-detached houses. Originally known as Aman Residency, the development was subsequently renamed Damansara Residensi upon completion. Genting Citra carried out the construction on leasehold land from 2005 to 2006. The area earmarked for this development was previously covered by secondary jungle. This development is a gated community situated behind SK Damansara Jaya, a national-type primary school.

In terms of recent residential property additions, OCR Land Holdings constructed four units of three-storey bungalows named Cloverton between 2012 and 2014, representing the latest housing development in Damansara Jaya.

== Government ==
Damansara Jaya is governed by the Petaling Jaya City Council (Majlis Bandaraya Petaling Jaya, MBPJ). It falls within the city's Zone 5 administrative area, and is represented by a city councillor.

Damansara Jaya is also represented at both the national and state levels of government as part of larger federal and state constituencies. In the Parliament of Malaysia, the township is represented as part of the Damansara (P.106) federal constituency and is currently served by Member of Parliament Gobind Singh Deo. In the Selangor State Legislative Assembly, the township is represented by the state constituency of Bandar Utama (N.36) and is served by State Legislative Assemblyperson Jamaliah Jamaluddin, who was re-elected during the 2023 Malaysian state elections.

=== Political representatives ===
Parliament of Malaysia
Parliament	Years	Constituency Name	Member	Party
Township developed by Paramount Garden
3rd	1971-1974	Damansara	Hor Cheok Foon	DAP
4th	1974-1978	Petaling	Oh Keng Seng	DAP
5th	1978-1982	Petaling	Lim Kit Siang	DAP
6th	1982-1986	Petaling	Yeoh Poh San	BN (MCA)
7th	1986–1990	Petaling Jaya	Eng Seng Chai	DAP
8th	1990–1995	Petaling Jaya	Kua Kia Soong	DAP
9th	1995-1999	Petaling Jaya Utara	Lim Kuo Phau	BN (MCA)
10th	1999-2004	Petaling Jaya Utara	Chew Mei Fun	BN (MCA)
11th	2004-2008	Petaling Jaya Utara	Chew Mei Fun	BN (MCA)
12th	2008-2013	Petaling Jaya Utara	Tony Pua Kiam Wee	DAP
13th	2013-2018	Petaling Jaya Utara	Tony Pua Kiam Wee	DAP
14th	2018–2022	Damansara	Tony Pua Kiam Wee	PH (DAP)
15th	2022–present	Damansara	Gobind Singh Deo	PH (DAP)

Selangor State Legislative Assembly
State Legislative Assembly	Years	Constituency Name	Member	Party
Township developed by Paramount Garden
7th	1986-1990	Damansara Utama	M. Madhavan Nair	DAP
8th	1990-1995	Damansara Utama	M. Madhavan Nair	DAP
9th	1995-1999	Damansara Utama	Oon Hong Geok	DAP
10th	1999-2004	Damansara Utama	Lim Choon Kim	BN (MCA)
11th	2004-2008	Damansara Utama	Lim Choon Kim	BN (MCA)
12th	2008-2013	Damansara Utama	Dr Cheah Wing Yin	DAP
13th	2013-2018	Damansara Utama	Yeo Bee Yin	DAP
14th	2018–2023	Bandar Utama	Jamaliah Jamaluddin	PH (DAP)
15th	2023–present	Bandar Utama	Jamaliah Jamaluddin	PH (DAP)

== Commerce ==
In Damansara Jaya, commercial activity is primarily concentrated in two distinct areas - the Atria shopping complex and shop-lots located both around the Atria and beyond it. The Atria features a four-level shopping complex and accompanying parking buildings. The shop-lots serve as a local commercial hub, offering a range of shops, eateries, and services to the community.

=== The Atria ===
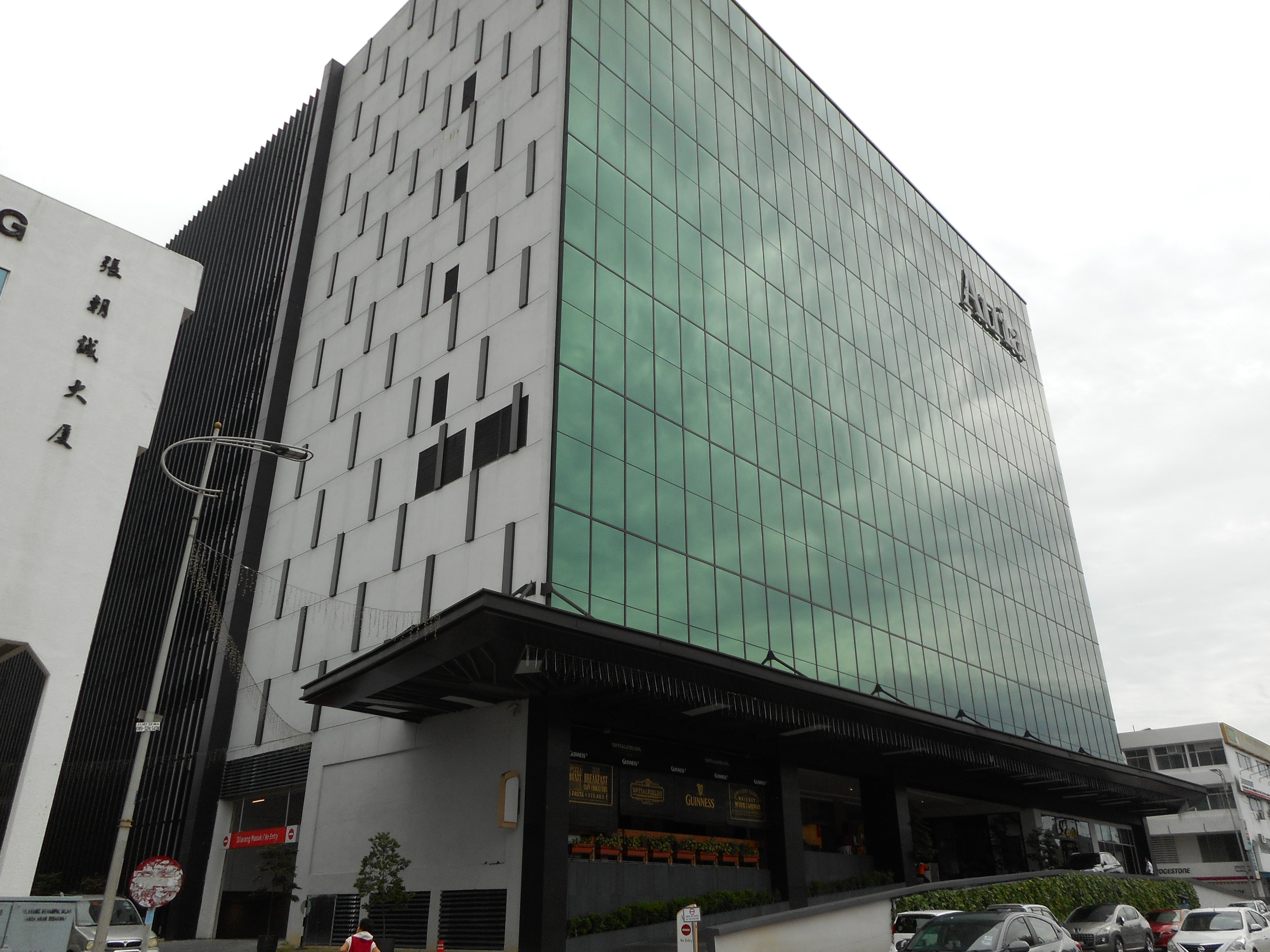
Exterior of the redeveloped Atria Shopping Gallery.

The primary commercial development in Damansara Jaya is the Atria, encompassing a freehold land area of 236,806 sq ft (22,000.0 m^{2}). The complex consisted of a four-level shopping complex and two parking buildings with three levels each. Originally intended to accommodate a cinema, Atria began its operations in the mid-1980s with the opening of the Kimisawa and Printemps departmental stores. During the period between 1984 and 1985, traffic congestion became a common occurrence in Damansara Jaya, particularly on weekends when both the Japanese and French stores held sales promotions. These shopping complexes were highly regarded as "must-visit" destinations in Petaling Jaya, with other options such as Asia Jaya, Thrifty Supermarket, or Jaya Shopping Complex considered less appealing. The Piccadilly Disco, situated within Atria, was a social spot for teenagers and college students. The disco was known for its afternoon tea dances, as well as frequent police raids on the premises. However, the late 1980s recession led to the eventual closure of these three establishments. The discothèque, which had its main entrance on the side of the building, has since been replaced by other businesses. As of 2008, it now houses a language centre. Following the economic downturn, ownership of the complex was transferred to the Lion Group. Consequently, the former Kimisawa location was rebranded as the Parkson Grand departmental store, while Printemps underwent a transformation into the Atria Shopping Centre.

In the early 2000s, Lien Hoe Corporation assumed control of Atria. The supermarket within Parkson was successively taken over by Tops and then Giant in 2005. Subsequently, Parkson Grand ceased its operations and relocated to 1 Utama. The new owners made a decision to allocate additional space for redevelopment, resulting in the displacement of numerous longstanding tenants occupying mini shop-lots near the supermarket. These tenants were required to find alternative locations.

The opening of Tropicana City Mall (now renamed to 3 Damansara) in nearby Damansara Utama, as well as The Starling Mall, has introduced significant competition to the Atria's business operations.

In March 2007, Lien Hoe Corporation sold the Atria at RM75,000,000 to OSK Property Holdings Bhd. At the time, the ground floor stores at Atria remained operational, with its courtyard continued to house various traders offering a range of merchandise, including books and clothing. The Atria was redeveloped and reopened to the public in 2015.

==== Redevelopment ====
In early 2008, OSK Property Holdings Bhd proposed to redevelop the Atria into a 33-storey office tower with a 4-level retail podium and a 3 1/2 level basement car park. In January 2009, OSK proposed to redevelop the property into a more upmarket retail and commercial destination for residents of Petaling Jaya. The redeveloped modern shopping mall has gross lettable area of 1,300,000 sq ft (120,000 m^{2}) and also some low-rise shop offices. The development order was obtained in 2008 and the project began in the later part of 2010, with a potential gross development value of around RM 1 billion projected at the time to be realised by 2012.

On 14 April 2010, OSK Property announced at a company shareholders meeting that the development order had been endorsed and that the redeveloped Atria would feature a four-storey podium, two 18-storey towers, and an increase in parking facilities with over 2,000 bays available. The redevelopment was carried out by Atria Damansara Sdn Bhd and consisted of a four-storey podium and two 16-storey towers. On 26 April 2011, OSK gave three months notice to all the Atria tenants to vacate the shopping complex by 26 July 2011. OSK had apparently obtained updated approval from MBPJ to demolish the existing development and to construct in its place two 15-storey office blocks, a 4-storey podium incorporating a shopping mall, 2 levels of underground car park, and 4 levels of multi-storey car park. On 26 July, the Language House remained operating at the Atria due to a dispute involving the tenancy agreement between the Language House and OSK. The Language House departed from its Atria premises on 22 October, and subsequently re-commenced operations at Damansara Intan on 8 November.

Development signage put up in August 2011 indicated that the Atria would be demolished over a 6-months period. By then, the Atria complex, except for small section as access to the Language House, had been enclosed by metal hoardings. The initial loss of use of both the Atria multi-storey car parks had a significant impact on the availability of street parking bays. The car park building at the Atria main entrance was demolished by early September, followed by the demolition of the other car park building by mid-October. The demolition of the shopping complex proper begun after the departure of the Language House. By the end of 2011, the majority of the Atria complex had been demolished, including the façade of the old Parkson entrance, which disappeared within the following two weeks.

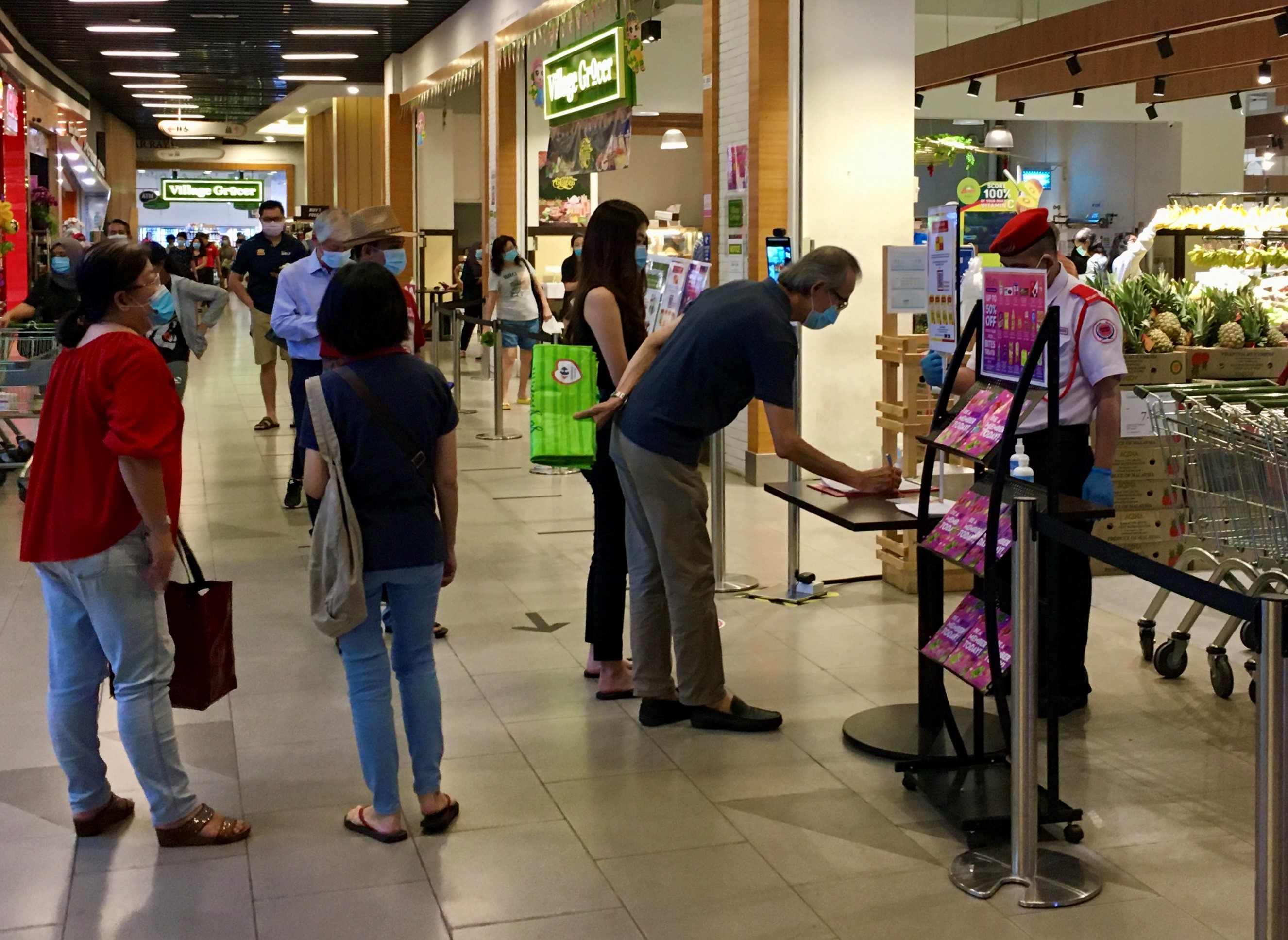
Interior of the redeveloped Atria Shopping Gallery.

On 6 July 2012, OSK Property further announced that the company had appointed Beijing Urban Construction Group (M) Sdn Bhd as the main contractor for the project. The first phase to be completed was the four-storey podium shopping mall, while the remaining developments were targeted for completion by the end of 2013. This Atria redevelopment faced protests from Damansara Jaya residents.

On 28 May 2015, the Atria was reopened. The redevelopment created 450,000 sq ft (42,000 m^{2}) of retail space for lease and 1,830 parking bays housed in two levels of underground parking and five levels of multi-storey parking. The final phase of the Atria's redevelopment commenced during the third quarter of 2016, involving the redevelopment of two food stall complexes at Jalan SS22/19 and Jalan SS22/25. For this phase, metal hoardings were placed almost in the middle of the road along a section of Jalan SS22/25.

=== Shoplots ===
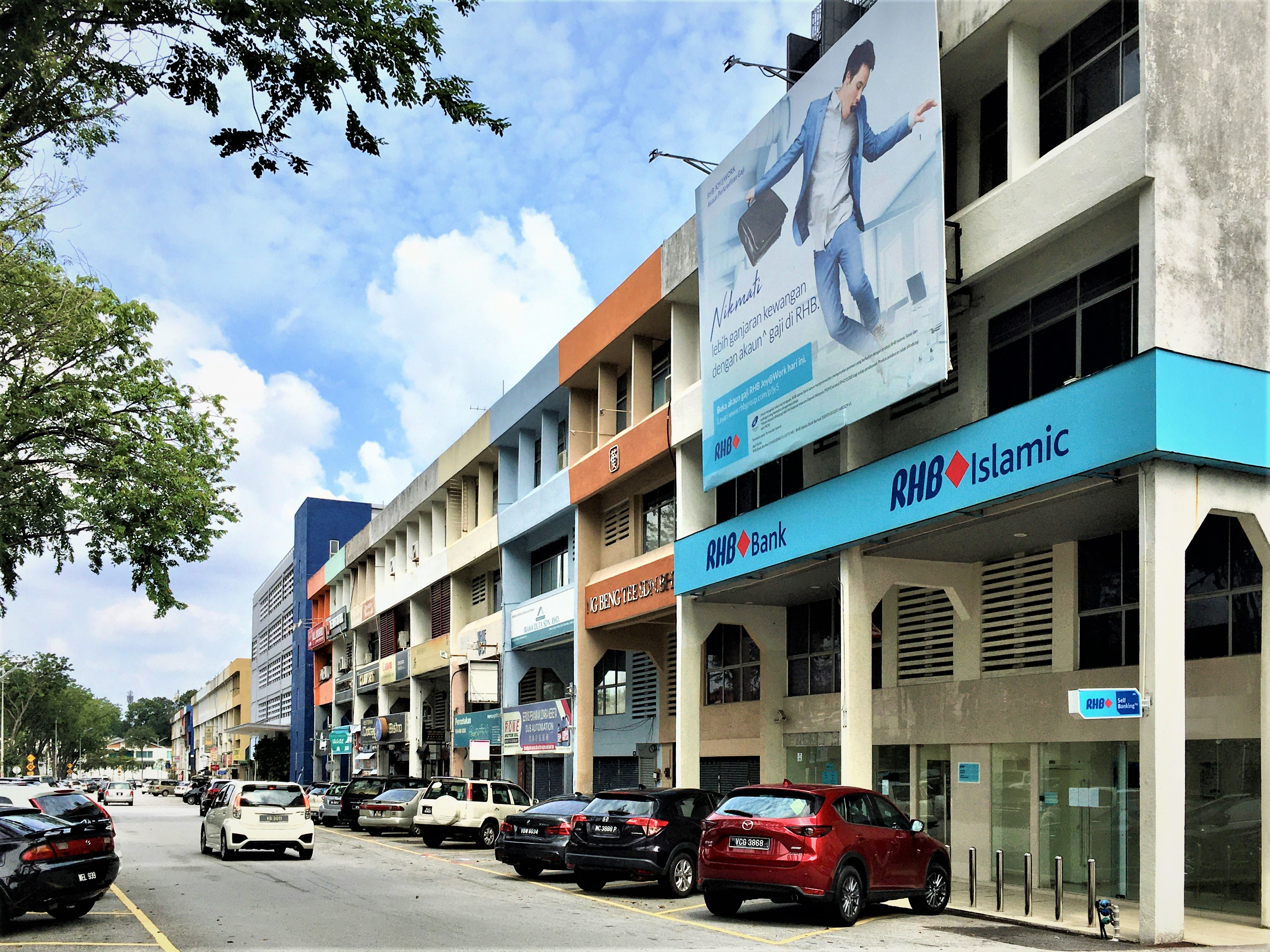
4-storey shoplots surrounding the Atria Shopping Gallery.

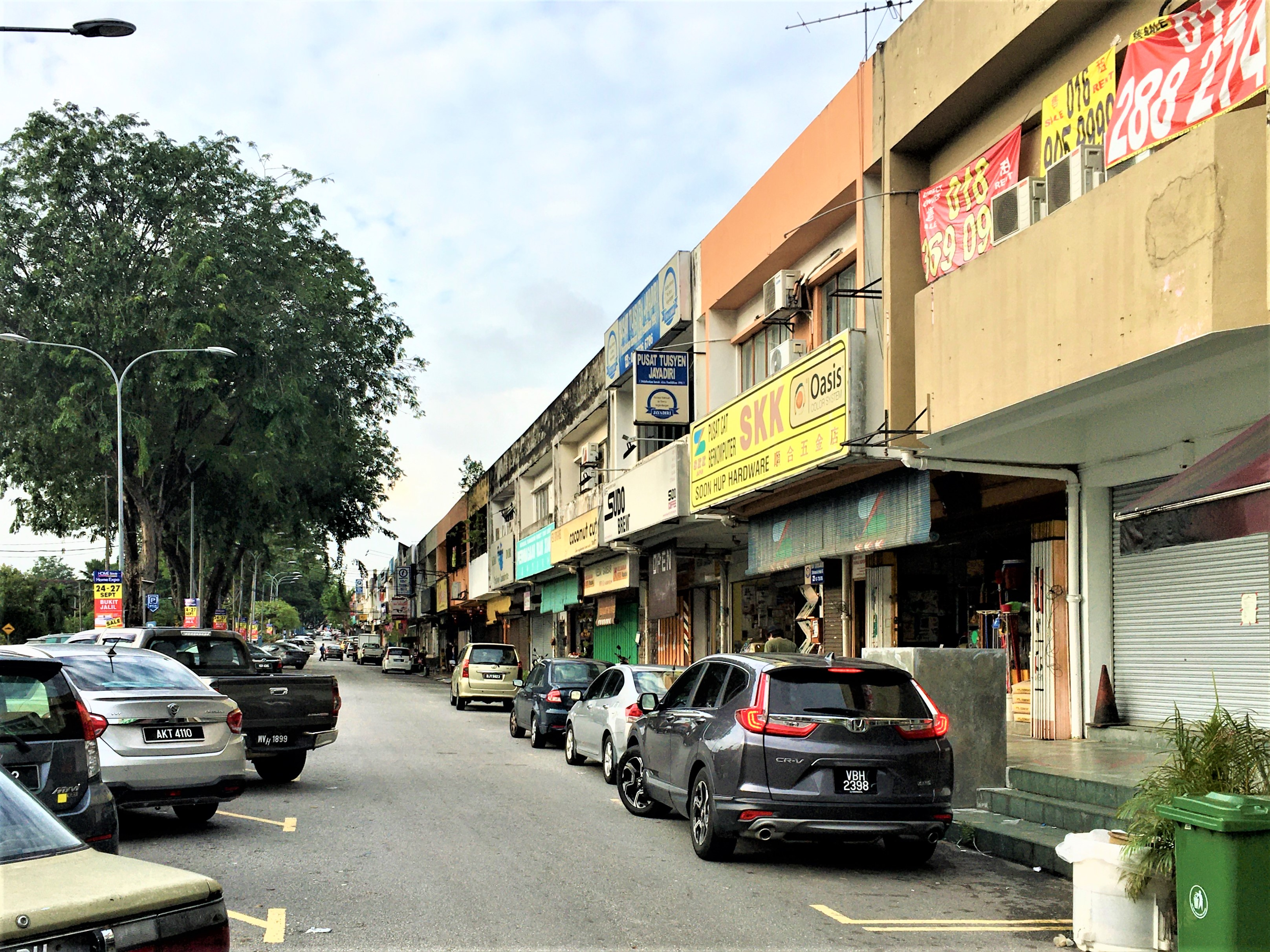
2-storey Mewah shoplots along Jalan SS22/11.

Shoplots in Damansara Jaya can found in either the 4-storey shops surrounding the Atria or the older 2-storey Mewah shops behind Sri Nobel International School. More upmarket establishments such as banks (Maybank, RHB Bank, and Public Bank), restaurants, pharmacies and clubs are found at the former. Conversely, the latter is home to more traditional businesses including coffee shops, sundry shops, and hardware stores.

== Healthcare ==
The Damansara Jaya township contains various healthcare services.

Nearby healthcare facilities include Thomson Hospital (formerly Tropicana Medical Centre) in Kota Damansara, Damansara Specialist Hospital in adjacent Damansara Utama, and BP Specialist Centre Taman Megah (formerly known as Sime Darby Specialist Center, and earlier as Megah Medical Specialist Group or MMSG) in nearby Taman SEA.

== Education ==
Damansara Jaya contains various educational establishments, including kindergartens, primary and secondary schools, tuition centres, art schools, and music schools.

The township is home to SK Damansara Jaya, a national-type primary school, and SMK Damansara Jaya, a government co-ed secondary school. The school's debate team has, to date, won ten national inter-school debating titles in recent years. These tournaments include the national Tan Sri Datuk Wira Abdul Rahman Arshad Cup (2001, 2003, 2008), Taylor's College Annual Inter-School Debate Competition (2000, 2002, 2005, 2006) and HELP University College's Tan Sri Paduka Dr Saleha Debate Cup (2004, 2006, 2008).

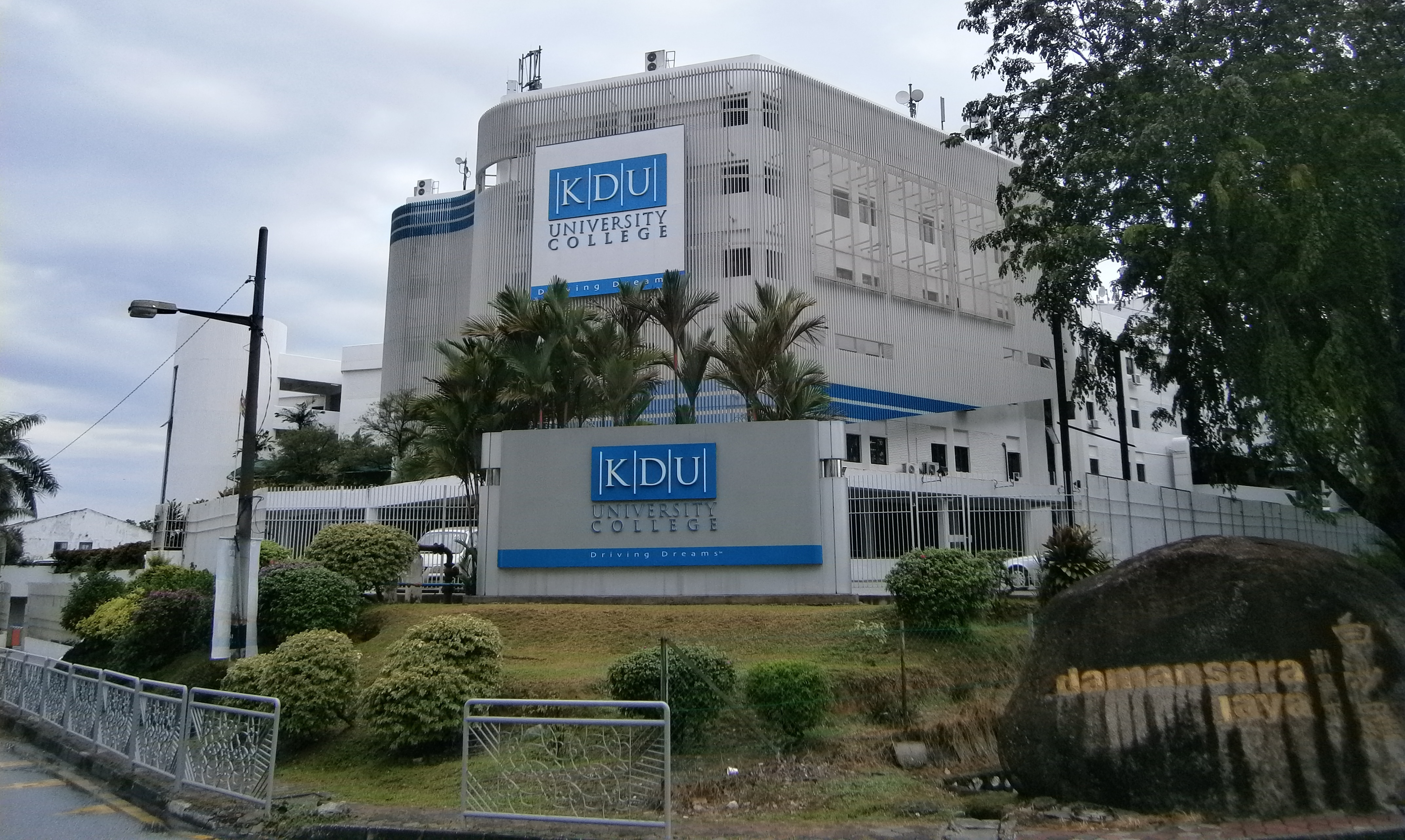
Now-closed Damansara Jaya campus of KDU University College.

In early 2007, the Itqan Integrated Islamic School commenced operations at a bungalow within the township to provide tuition and Islamic education in English and Arabic. Prior to that, the bungalow housed the Aladdin Kindergarten, which ceased operations and left behind a dilapidated building which was renovated to house the Islamic school. In November 2013, Itqan ceased operations at Damansara Jaya and relocated to Sungai Penchala. The old Itqan building has since remained unoccupied.

In the early 2020s, Nobel International School opened on the former site of KDU College.

== Transportation ==
=== Public transport ===
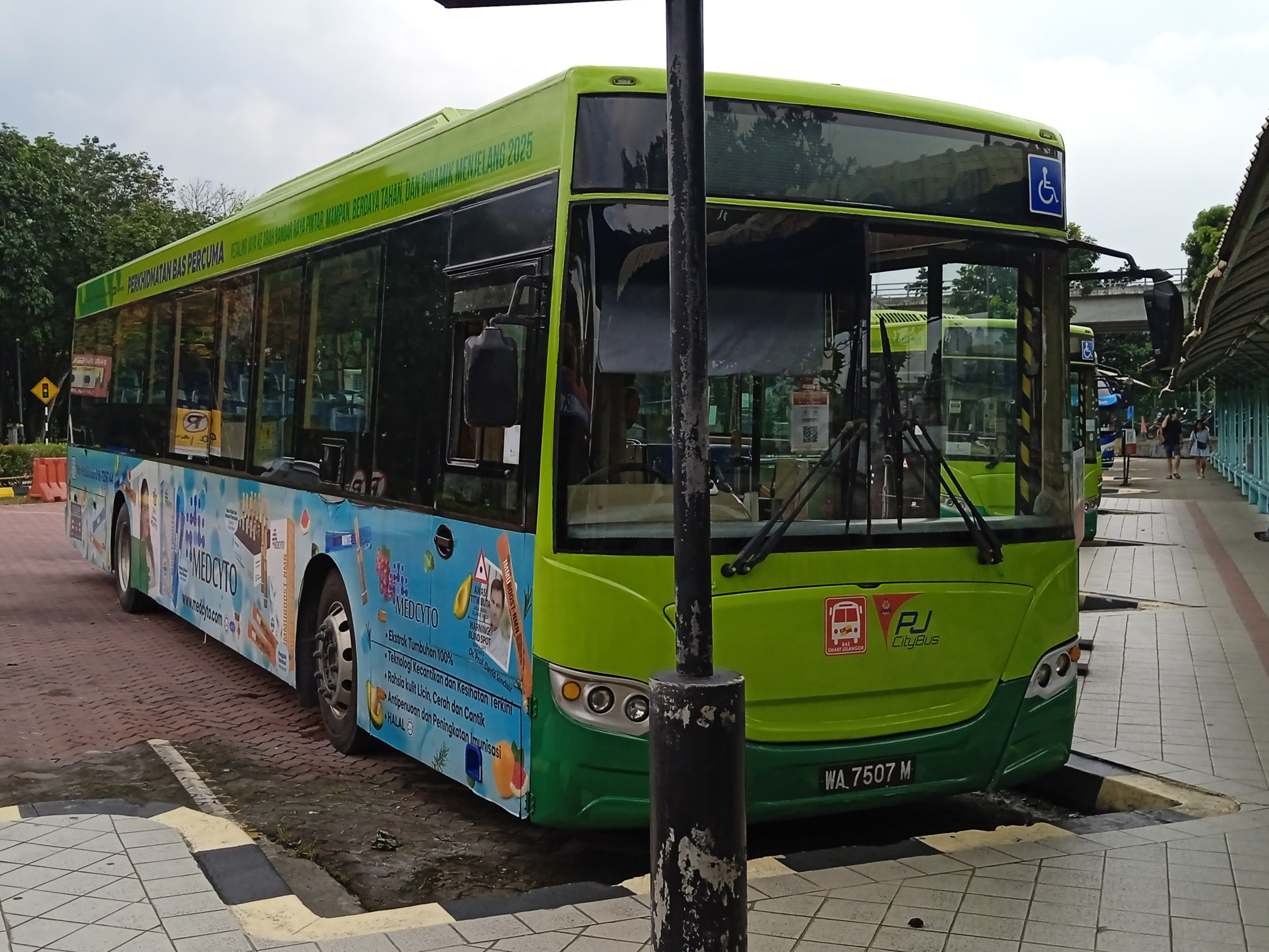
PJ City Bus route PJ05 at Bandar Utama bus hub

As of December 2019, public bus services are provided by RapidKL which operates several paid bus routes, and the Petaling Jaya City Council which operates the PJ City Bus, a free bus service. RapidKL bus route numbers 802, T784, and T813, as well as PJ City Bus route number PJ05 serve Damansara Jaya.

These bus routes connect Damansara Jaya to the Klang Valley Integrated Transit System, stopping at the Kelana Jaya LRT line stations of Taman Bahagia and Kelana Jaya, and at the Sungai Buloh-Kajang MRT line station of Taman Tun Dr Ismail.

All public transport in Damansara Jaya accept Touch 'n Go smart cards.

=== Roads ===
Damansara Jaya has excellent access to expressways. It is surrounded by the Damansara–Puchong Expressway (LDP) on its east, the Sprint Expressway (SPRINT) on its north and North Klang Valley Expressway (NKVE) on its west. Most roads in Damansara Jaya are single-lane two-way roads.

== Resident associations ==
The Damansara Jaya Residents and Owners Association (DJROA), formed in 1994, represents the interests of a majority of residents in this township. The DJROA had its beginnings in October 1993, when residents grouped together to successfully address local authority plans to have a night market at the then dead-end road of Jalan SS22/43. The association operates a community centre located on Jalan SS22/30. This community centre was officially opened on 15 December 2005 by Dato' Seri Ong Ka Ting, then the Malaysian Minister of Housing and Local Government. Activities such as line dancing and Wai Dan Gong are regularly conducted at the DJROA Community Centre.

The DJROA has participated in the United Nations-sponsored Local Agenda 21 programme under the auspices of the Petaling Jaya City Council. In November 2009, the DJROA won first prize for the Best Neighbourhood Award from the Petaling Jaya City Council, having previously also won first prize in 2001 and placed second in 2004. The DJROA has won the Petaling Jaya Sustainable Community Premier Award multiple times, including in 2011.

The Damansara Residency Residents Association looks after the interest of residents of the development on Jalan SS22/47A. In 2014, the residents of Jalan SS22/39, Jalan SS22/39A and Jalan SS22/39B established their own independent resident association.

On 5 December 2009, Nik Nazmi Nik Ahmad (then-Seri Setia State Assemblyman and political secretary to the Chief Minister) represented the Menteri Besar of Selangor, Tan Sri Abdul Khalid Ibrahim, to officially launch Community Policing in Damansara Jaya.

== Places of interest ==
=== Places of worship ===
Buddhist Wisdom Centre (Theravada) is located at 14, Jalan SS 22/27a, and it has classes about the Dharma and meditation.

A Sword of the Spirit Charismatic Church is located on the first floor at 11 Jalan SS22/23. An Evangelical Bible Presbyterian Church is located on the ground floor at 26 Jalan SS22/21. The Gospel Lighthouse Pentecostal Church is located on the second floor of at 44 Jalan SS22/25. On 1 November 2009, the New Covenant Church commenced services on the 3rd Floor of the Atria in the space which used to be the rear portion of the Big Bookshop. This church relocated elsewhere at the end of its 12-month tenancy.

Petaling Jaya's only Hindu cemetery is situated in Damansara Jaya, next to Nobel International School.

=== Prominent business offices ===
Gamuda Engineering Sdn Bhd has its corporate office located on Jalan SS22/21 in Damansara Jaya. Gamuda is principally involved in engineering and construction, infrastructure and township developments. The adjacent Damansara-Puchong Expressway (LDP), was constructed by Gamuda in a joint venture with Irama Duta. As of July 2023, Gamuda Berhad, a KLSE First Board listed company, has their corporate office currently located in PJ Trade Centre, Damansara Perdana.

== Notable people ==
- Datuk Yew Cheng Hoe - former Malaysian men's badminton player (1963–1967), former DJROA president
- Tan Sri Bakri Omar - former Malaysian Inspector-General of Police (2003–2006)
- Tan Sri Dato' Sri Ong Ka Ting - former Malaysian Minister of Housing and Local Government (1997–2008), former Malaysian Chinese Association president (May 2003–October 2008)
- Heidy Quah - Malaysian social rights advocate
