= Philharmonic Society of Selangor =

Choral and instrumental group

The Philharmonic Society of Selangor
- Choir
- Founded: 15 January 1958
- Location: Kuala Lumpur, Malaysia
- Music director: Koh Tian Yi
- Website: www.thephil.org.my

Not to be mistaken for the Selangor Philharmonic Orchestra

The Philharmonic Society of Selangor, also known as the Selangor Philharmonic Society or, colloquially, the Phil, is an amateur choral and instrumental group based in Kuala Lumpur, Malaysia, and is one of Malaysia's oldest musical societies.

== History ==
The society was launched on 15 January 1958 by a group of eleven British expatriates amateur musicians in the card room of the Selangor club with the aim of staging performances and encouraging the arts. Its first conductor was Major Leonard Sharp, and its first performance was The Mikado, in July 1958. It takes its name from the state that Kuala Lumpur was located in before the Capital Territory was created.

Originally it was an auditioned choir but in 2009 it began to accept members without audition. In the 1980s it began to practise all year long rather than only in preparation for performances. For the first 35 years of its existence, it performed only foreign works, but in 1993 it performed its first Asian-origin performance. By 2005 it was regularly performing Malaysian works as well as Western ones. As of 2015 the choir had up to 300 members and had already staged more than 50 performances. Proceeds from its performances are donated to charity. The choir has toured outside Malaysia, including in Australia and India.

In July 2023 the Phil held a concert to celebrate its 65th anniversary, the proceeds from which were donated to charity.
