= Pusing =

Town in Kinta District, Perak, Malaysia

Coordinates: 4°30′N 101°01′E

Pusing (Jawi: ڤوسيڠ; Chinese: 布先) is a small town in Kinta District, Perak, Malaysia. It is located near Batu Gajah

== Village (Kampung)/Housing Area (Taman) ==
- Railway Reserve
- Kampung Baru Gunung Hijau
- Taman Medan Pusing
- Taman Pelangi
- Taman Gunung Hijau
- Kampung Pinang A
- Kampung Pinang B
- Kampung Papan
- Kampung Papan Baru
- Taman Pusing Murni
- Taman Cenderawasih
- Taman Pusing Mutiara
- Bandar Baru Puspa
- Taman Pusing Baru
- Taman Pusing Mewah
- Medan Pusing Saujana
- Taman Pusing Perdana
- Taman Batu Gajah Perdana
- Taman Pusing Delima

== Ethnography ==
80% of the residents are ethnically Chinese of Cantonese and/or Hakka origin, and the rest are Malay, Indian or others.

== Educational ==
Primary Schools: Sekolah Kebangsaan Pusing, Sekolah Jenis Kebangsaan (Cina) Yit Chee, Sekolah Jenis Kebangsaan (Cina) Gunung Hijau.

Secondary School: SMK Pusing.

== Facilities ==
- Pusing Post Office, Lahat Road, 31550 Pusing.
- Pusing Police Station, Batu Gajah Road, 31550 Pusing.
- Perpustakaan Umum Pusing (Pusing Public Library)

== Religion ==
- Masjid Hasni
- Tham Sen Temple
- Gurdwara Sahib
- Sri Muneeswarar Temple
- Methodist Church

== Notable people ==
Jeffrey Cheah, founder and chairman of the Sunway Group.
