= Woo Wing Thye =

Malaysian-American economist

Yang Berbahagia Dato' Woo Wing Thye DSPN
- 胡永泰
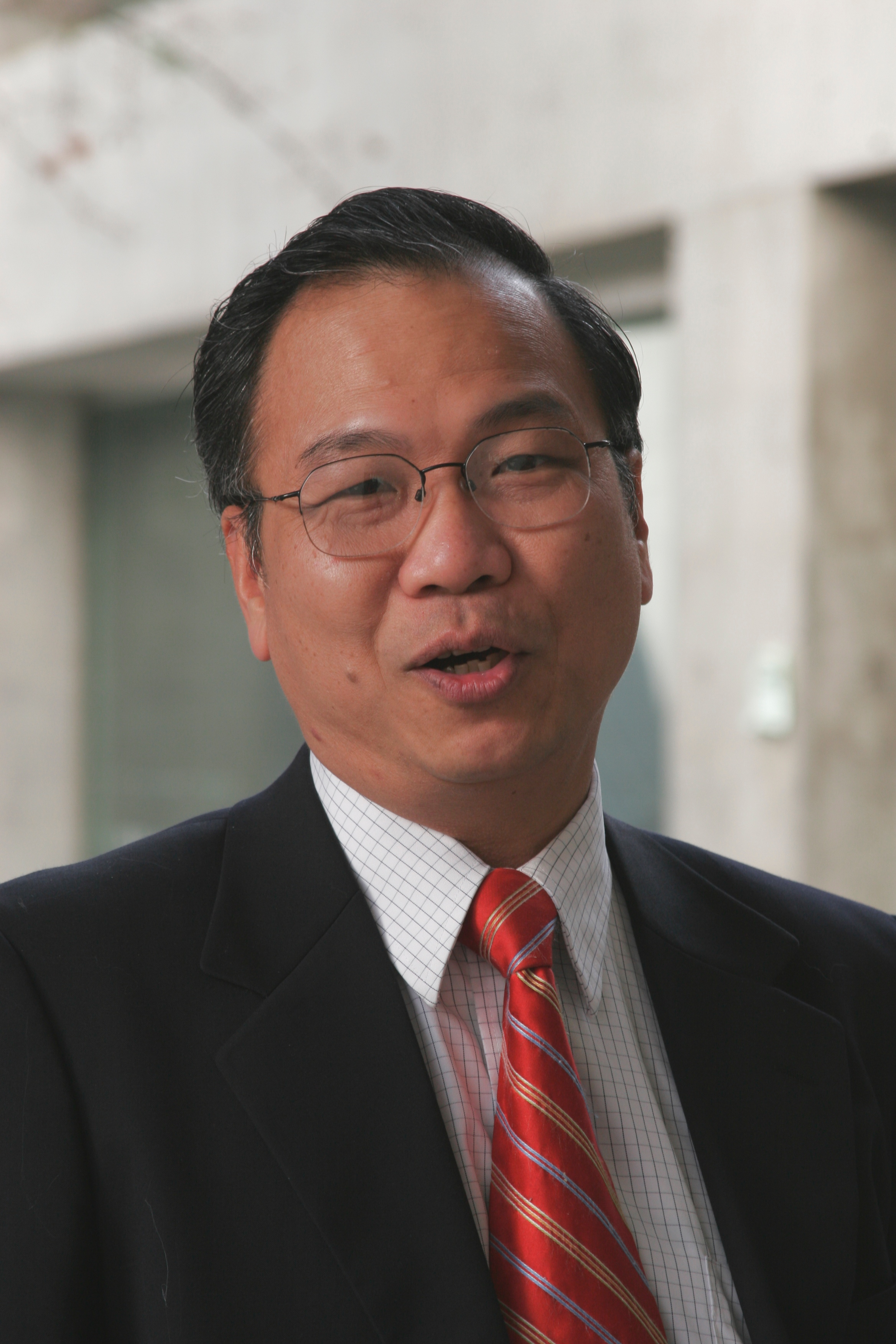
- Born: 1954 (age 71–72); Penang, Malaysia

Academic background
- Education: Swarthmore College; Yale University; Harvard University

Academic work
- Institutions: University of California, Davis; Liaoning University; The University of Hong Kong; Universiti Malaya
- Notable ideas: Middle Income Trap; Open economy macroeconomics Transition economy East Asian Economies
- Website: Information at IDEAS / RePEc

Woo Wing Thye (Chinese: 胡永泰) is an American economist. He is currently University Chair Professor at China Economic Research Institute of Liaoning University in Shenyang, China; Distinguished Fellow of the Penang Institute in George Town, Malaysia; National Distinguished Fellow in the Thousand Talents Program of China; Changjiang Professor in China; and Distinguished Professor Emeritus of Economics at University of California, Davis. He is also Visiting Professor at the School of Governance and Policy of The University of Hong Kong, Institute for Advanced Studies of Universiti Malaya in Kuala Lumpur, and Fudan Development Institute of Fudan University in Shanghai, and a member of the International Advisory Council at the Center for Social and Economic Research (CASE).

Professor Woo is an expert on East Asian economies, particularly China, Malaysia and Indonesia. He has written extensively on the middle-income trap, as well as on transition economics, growth and development, globalization, exchange rate economics, and regional economic disparity.

He earned his PhD from Harvard University in 1982 with a thesis entitled 'Exchange rate determination under rational expectations: a structural approach'. The University of Cambodia awarded Professor Woo an Honorary Doctorate in Sustainable Development in 2020.

== Biography ==
Woo was born in 1954 in George Town, Penang, Malaysia, was a student at the Pykett Methodist School (1961-1966) and the Methodist Boys' School (1967-1973), and was an active member of the 2nd Georgetown (S) Senior Scout troop. Following undergraduate study in economics and engineering at Swarthmore College, he took an MA in economics at Yale and later an MA and PhD at Harvard (1982). Woo has been a member the economics faculty at the University of California, Davis since 1985. He has also worked at the Brookings Institution in Washington, D.C., at different stages of his career, starting as a Research Assistant in 1976–77, then as a Research Associate in 1982–1985, and finally as the New Century Chair in International Trade and Economics from 2006 to 2009.

Woo worked as a consultant for China's Ministry of Finance in 1992-1993 From 1997 to 1998, he was a special advisor to the U.S. Treasury on East Asian economies.

In 2001, Woo helped establish the Asian Economic Panel (AEP), which meets three times a year to discuss issues of importance to the region's economies. Selected proceedings of the AEP are published in the Asian Economic Papers, MIT Press.

From 2002 until 2005, Woo was a special advisor for East Asian Economies to the United Nations Millennium Project. In July 2005, he was appointed to the International Advisory Panel for Malaysia's then-Prime Minister Abdullah Ahmad Badawi, and he was an economics advisor to the State of Penang in 2008–2018. He was executive director of the Penang Institute, Penang state government's public policy think tank, between 2012 and 2013. Woo was a member of the board of directors of Sunway University in Subang Jaya, Selangor state, Malaysia. He was founding President of the Jeffrey Cheah Institute on Southeast Asia in 2014–2022, founding Director of the Jeffrey Sachs Center for Sustainable Development (JSC) in 2016–2022, and Acting CEO of the Asian Strategic Leadership Institute (ASLI) in 2021–2022. He led JSC to design and offer a new Masters of Sustainable Development Management (MSDM) program in January 2019, and when COVID-19 hit in March 2020, to develop an online version of the MSDM program to meet the needs of students and to make MSDM accessible to the world.

Woo was Vice-President for Asia of UN Sustainable Development Solutions Network (SDSN) in 2020-2026.

== Research interests ==
Professor Woo's research interests are economic restructuring, financial contagion, fiscal crisis, and the 17 Sustainable Development Goals. His research covers China's economic reforms as well as its sources of growth and the wealth gap, which Woo argues has been significantly understated.

Woo has been called "one of the world's foremost experts on the Chinese economy," and appears regularly in the media. He is also a contributor to Project Syndicate.

== Honours ==
- Penang
  - Officer of the Order of the Defender of State (DSPN) – Dato' (2009)
- University of Cambodia, Phnom Penh
  - Honorary Doctorate in Sustainable Development (2020)
