= Sunway University =

Private, not-for-profit top research university in Petaling Jaya, Selangor, Malaysia

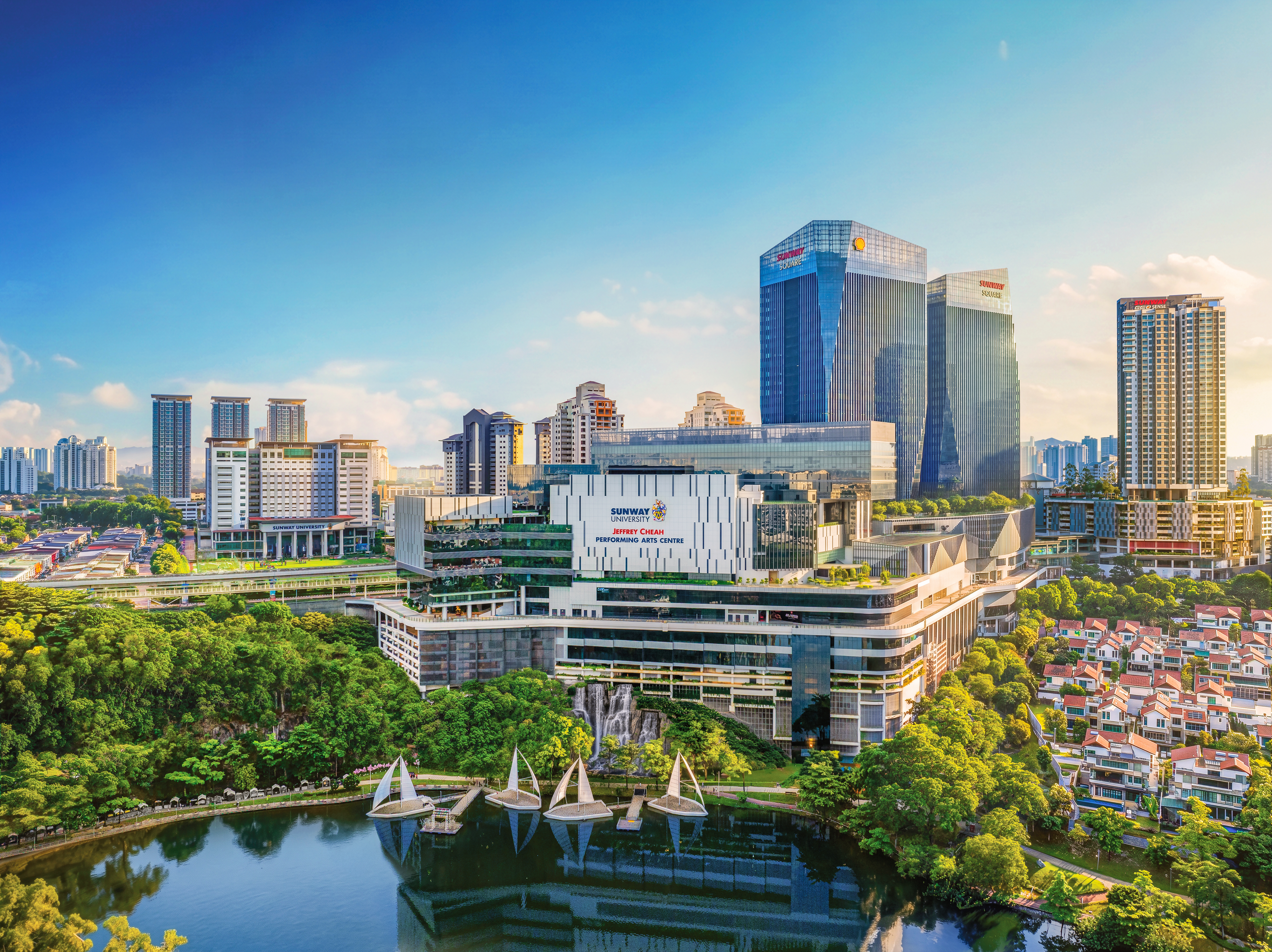
- Motto: Fortuna Eruditis Favet ("Fortune Favours the Prepared Mind")
- Type: Private - not for profit
- Established: 2004; 22 years ago
- Affiliations: Sunway College; Monash University; Lancaster University; Le Cordon Bleu; University of Oxford; University of Cambridge; Harvard University; ACCA; ICAEW; MAPCU
- Chancellor: Jeffrey Cheah
- President: Sibrandes Poppema
- Vice-Chancellor: Sibrandes Poppema
- Provost: Abhimanyu Veerakumarasivam
- Location: Bandar Sunway, Petaling Jaya, Selangor, Malaysia; 3.0681°N 101.6041°E
- Campus: Urban
- Website: sunwayuniversity.edu.my

Sunway University is a private, not-for-profit University located in Bandar Sunway, Greater Kuala Lumpur, Malaysia. Positioned as a mission-driven, 5th-generation university, Sunway University is a comprehensive institution known as the "Campus with a Conscience" for its integration of sustainability, planetary health, and real-world problem-solving into campus life. As one of the world's most sustainable universities, it is ranked #45 in the Times Higher Education (THE) Sustainability Impact Ratings.

The university has been recognised as the highest-ranked private university in Southeast Asia by the ranking body AppliedHE. It has also been named the university with the most employable graduates in Malaysia by Talentbank for five consecutive years.

The university offers a comprehensive range of undergraduate and postgraduate programmes in actuarial science and finance, business, communication, computer science, culinary arts and hospitality, design and architecture, education, engineering, medicine and healthcare, and sustainable development. As a not-for-profit institution, it is part of the Sunway Education Group, which oversees 16 institutions and is governed by the Jeffrey Cheah Foundation.

The university comprises 8 Faculties and Schools, as well as a number of research centres. The campus is divided into two main sections, both in Bandar Sunway; the main campus, and the expanded campus at Sunway Square, which was inaugurated in late 2025.

== History ==
The university's history dates to 1987 when Sunway College was established. This was followed by the launch of the Sunway Education Trust Fund in 1997. The Sunway Education Trust Fund was later succeeded by the Jeffrey Cheah Foundation in 2010.

In 2004, the college was recognised by the Malaysian Ministry of Higher Education (MOHE) as a university college, thus forming Sunway University College.

In 2006, a partnership was established with Lancaster University, allowing those who complete certain programmes to be awarded degrees from both institutions.

In 2010, Sunway University established a partnership with Le Cordon Bleu, an international culinary and hospitality education institution headquartered in Paris. Under the partnership, selected hospitality, culinary, and events programmes are delivered using curricula aligned with Le Cordon Bleu standards. Graduates receive a Sunway University degree or diploma together with a Le Cordon Bleu certificate upon successful completion of the programme.

In January 2011, Sunway University College received full university accreditation from MOHE, becoming Sunway University.

2016 saw the establishment of the Jeffrey Sachs Centre, with the aim of advancing the United Nations’ Sustainable Development Goals (SDGs) among Southeast Asian nations by promoting collaboration and linkages between leading universities and institutions.

This was followed by the establishment of the Sunway Centre for Planetary Health (SCPH) in 2021, with Professor Tan Sri Dr Jemilah Mahmood serving as executive director. SCPH is committed to research and advocacy that advance planetary health through three priority areas: healthy cities, health-centred decarbonisation, and education.

Professor Sibrandes Poppema was appointed President of Sunway University in 2021. Professor Poppema, a Jeffrey Cheah Distinguished Professor, joined the university in 2019 after serving as the President of the University of Groningen in the Netherlands.

In 2023, Sunway University established a strategic partnership with Arizona State University (ASU), a top public research university in the United States. The collaboration enables students to pursue American-style degree programmes in Malaysia, with pathways including dual-degree opportunities, credit transfer, and progression to ASU campuses in the United States. The partnership also supports collaboration in curriculum development, research, innovation, and faculty engagement.

A significant milestone for the university was the launch of the Jeffrey Cheah Medical School in 2025.

== Campus ==
The main campus area spans 22 acres and houses both Sunway University and Sunway College.

The campus is accessible via public transport, with the Sunway BRT line being linked to other major public transport systems such as the LRT and KTM lines through interchange stations. This allows for quick and direct connectivity to the heart of Kuala Lumpur and the wider Klang Valley. It is also linked to Sunway Pyramid, Sunway Lagoon, Sunway Medical Centre, Sunway Square Mall and Sunway Geo through the Canopy Walk, an elevated pedestrian walkway system across Bandar Sunway.

=== Main University Building ===
Sunway University main building

The university building was completed in 2015. It houses the Hussein Onn Sunway Library, as well as a variety of laboratories, classrooms and a campus cafeteria. The campus is also equipped with a FIFA-certified football field and a gymnasium. There used to be a Switch Apple Authorized Reseller store in the campus, but it was permanently closed in around 2025, and it has been taken over by Le Cordon Bleu Sunway. In 2025, the campus was awarded GreenRE Platinum certification in recognition of its sustainability features.

=== College Building ===
Sunway University college building

The Sunway College building was officially opened in 1993, at a ceremony attended by Tan Sri Dato’ Seri Dr Jeffrey Cheah AO, Tun Dr Mahathir Mohamad and Tun Musa bin Hitam. Pre-university courses and diploma studies are conducted in this building.

=== Sunway Square Campus ===
In late 2025, the campus was expanded as part of the new Sunway Square building, which also houses the Sunway Square Mall and the Sunway Square Corporate Towers. This expansion allows for an additional 700,000 sq ft of student capacity. The Sunway Square campus is home to Sunway Business School and the Faculty of Arts and Social Sciences. Among the facilities available at the Sunway Square campus are:

- Film shooting studio
- Post-production studio
- Foley studio
- Recording studio
- Webcast studio
- Recital hall with a grand piano
- Real-world trading room
- Behavioural labs

Sunway Square also houses the Jeffrey Cheah Performing Arts Centre, which offers two venues, the 1,200-seat Proscenium Theatre and a 150-seat Experimental Theatre. The centre will host its inaugural event in August 2026.

Net-Zero Carbon Building (Faculty of Engineering and Technology)

=== The Net-Zero Carbon Building (Faculty of Engineering and Technology) ===
Sunway's Faculty of Engineering and Technology is housed within the newly developed Net-Zero Carbon building. The building reduces embodied carbon by over 40% and cuts energy use by up to 50%. The facilities available include:

- A chemical engineering pilot plant
- Civil, robotics, and cybersecurity labs
- Architecture studios and classrooms

=== Graduate Centre Building ===
The Sunway Graduate Centre building serves as an extension to Sunway University and Sunway College, providing additional lecture halls for classes to be conducted. The building also comes with multiple study spaces for students, including a rooftop study deck.

=== Student Accommodation ===
Student accommodation is available within the campus area. The accommodation options include Sun-U Residence, Waterfront Residences, and Sun-U Apartment. These are managed by Sunway House Student Residences, which has been recognised by the Malaysian Book of Records as Largest Purpose-Built Student Accommodation (PBSA) Operator since March 2026.

== Governance ==
Sunway University is part of the Sunway Education Group, which is governed by The Jeffrey Cheah Foundation. The university's board of directors is led by Tan Sri Dato’ Seri Dr Jeffrey Cheah AO, the founder and chairman of the Sunway Group of companies. He is also the Chancellor of Sunway University. Professor Dato’ Dr Elizabeth Lee serves as the Group CEO of Sunway Education Group.

The university is led by its president and Vice-Chancellor, Professor Sibrandes Poppema, who has served in the role since 2021. The Provost and Deputy Vice-Chancellor, Professor Abhi Veerakumarasivam, is the university's second-most senior executive officer and chief academic leader, overseeing the university's academic affairs and strategic initiatives. Together, they are supported by the senior leadership team across the Chancellery, Faculties and Schools

The Academic Senate chaired by the President and Vice Chancellor is the highest academic governing body of the university.

== Research ==
The university hosts several leading research centres and institutes, including the Jeffrey Sachs Center on Sustainable Development, the Sunway Centre for Planetary Health, and the flagship Sunway University–Lancaster University Future Cities Research Institute, reflecting its strategic focus on sustainability, planetary health, and interdisciplinary research.

Other notable centres include:

- Research Centre for Carbon Dioxide Capture and Utilisation: carbon capture research and global collaboration to drive climate action, clean energy, and industrial innovation.
- Research Centre for Human-Machine Collaboration (HUMAC): fundamental and applied research to address real-world technological challenges.
- Research Centre for Nano-Materials and Energy Technology: conducts research on advanced nanomaterials to improve energy production, conversion, and storage technologies.
- Sunway Centre for Electrochemical Energy and Sustainable Technology: conducts research on graphene and two-dimensional nanomaterials for applications in energy storage, energy conversion, and biomedical engineering.
- Sunway Microbiome Centre: conducts research in microbiome science to develop applications for human health, food security, and environmental sustainability.
- Sunway Ageing, Health and Well-Being Research Centre: multidisciplinary research hub focused on the science of ageing, health, and well-being.
- Sunway Institute for Global Strategy and Competitiveness: conducts research on strategy and competitiveness beyond conventional economic metrics.
- Sunway Centre for Digital Humanities and Cultural Heritage: focused on the intersection of digital technology, creative media, and cultural heritage preservation.

Sunway also has a significant number of highly cited researchers among its academic staff. 43 academics from Sunway University were featured in the 2025 list of global Top 2% researchers jointly published by Stanford University and Elsevier.

== International Partnerships ==
Sunway University maintains several international academic partnerships, the most prominent of which is its long-standing collaboration with Lancaster University, established in 2006. Through this transnational education partnership, students enrolled in selected programmes receive degrees from both institutions upon successful completion of their studies.

In hospitality and culinary arts, Sunway University has partnered with the French culinary institution Le Cordon Bleu since 2010. The collaboration integrates Le Cordon Bleu's culinary education with Sunway University's hospitality programmes. Selected degrees offered by the School of Hospitality and Tourism Management are validated by Le Cordon Bleu, enabling graduates to receive the Le Cordon Bleu certification in addition to their Sunway University degree.

Through benefactions from the Jeffrey Cheah Foundation, professorial fellowships have been established at Brasenose College, University of Oxford, and at Gonville and Caius College, University of Cambridge. These fellowships aim to foster academic ties between Sunway University and the respective institutions. The Jeffrey Cheah Scholars-in-Residence Programme, also supported by benefactions, allows academics or postgraduate students from Sunway University to spend up to four weeks each year for research or study at Brasenose College and Gonville and Caius College.

Sunway University is the Asia-Pacific host institution for the Harvard Medical School Leadership in Medicine: Asia Pacific programme, a postgraduate certificate programme delivered by Harvard Medical School in collaboration with Sunway University and Sunway Medical Centre. The programme attracts healthcare professionals and academic leaders from across the region and includes residential workshops at both Sunway University in Malaysia and Harvard Medical School in Boston, alongside online learning. It focuses on developing leadership capabilities in healthcare, medical education, quality improvement, and institutional management. Graduates receive a Harvard Medical School certificate and Harvard Medical School Associate Member status. The partnership also extends to Southeast Asian scholarship. The Jeffrey Cheah Foundation has endowed the Jeffrey Cheah Professorship of Global Health and Social Medicine Jeffrey Cheah Professorship in Southeast Asia Studies at Harvard University, further strengthening research and educational links between the two institutions.

Sunway University collaborates with the Massachusetts Institute of Technology (MIT) on research and innovation in sustainability, advanced materials, and energy technologies. The collaboration includes research in carbon capture and utilisation, artificial intelligence for materials discovery, and next-generation materials for energy conversion and storage. The partnership builds upon Sunway University's Research Centre for Carbon Dioxide Capture and Utilisation and reflects a shared commitment to developing technologies that support industrial decarbonisation and the global transition towards net-zero emissions

Sunway University maintains a long-term strategic biomedical research partnership with the University of Cambridge, centred on collaborative research, clinical translation, and capacity building. The partnership has supported joint research in pathogen genomics, including whole-genome sequencing and phylogenetic analyses of COVID-19 cases in Malaysia, as well as precision medicine initiatives in cancer genomics. Current collaborations include research on nasopharyngeal carcinoma led by researchers led by Professor Felicia Chung at Sunway University and Professor Serena Nik-Zainal's group at Cambridge, alongside the Cambridge–Sunway Disease Genomics Programme, which applies genomic technologies to advance cancer diagnosis and treatment.

The partnership is anchored by the Jeffrey Cheah Biomedical Centre (JCBC) on the Cambridge Biomedical Campus, a major biomedical research facility that serves as a hub for collaborative research between the two institutions. Through the JCBC, Sunway and Cambridge continue to establish joint programmes in translational medicine, clinical research, disease genomics, and scientific exchange, strengthening research links between Malaysia and the United Kingdom.

Sunway University has also formed a strategic partnership with Arizona State University (ASU), which began in 2023. Facilitated through Sunway's School of Sustainable Futures and Innovation, this collaboration integrates ASU's curriculum, online resources, and global network into Sunway's American Degree Transfer Program (ADTP). The partnership provides students with enhanced US-style education in Malaysia, featuring international exchange opportunities and transfer pathways to North American universities. Additionally, the institutions have developed innovative programmes in fields like Business, Computer Science, Psychology, and Communication, allowing students to graduate with degrees from both Sunway and ASU without leaving Malaysia.

In 2024, Sunway University launched its Doctor of Medicine (MD) programme through a strategic partnership with Universiti Kebangsaan Malaysia (UKM). Jointly developed by the two universities, the programme integrates curriculum development, academic governance, and quality assurance, combining UKM's established expertise in medical education with Sunway University's research-intensive ecosystem. The programme is anchored at Sunway Medical Centre, the university's principal teaching hospital and Malaysia's largest private quaternary hospital. Ranked No. 1 in Malaysia and 138th globally in Newsweek's World's Best Hospitals 2026, Sunway Medical Centre provides students with clinical training across more than 80 medical specialties and 28 centres of excellence. The hospital also houses a dedicated Clinical Research Centre, supporting investigator-initiated and industry-sponsored clinical trials, translational research, and early-phase studies, enabling medical students to train within an active academic healthcare and clinical research environment. Sunway Medical Centre functions as the regional site partner for the University of Cambridge School of Clinical Medicine, focusing on localized disease prevention, advanced clinical trials, and Asian-centric genetic health research.

== Rankings and Reputation ==
University rankings

Global – Overall
- QS World: 354 (2027)
- THE World: 283 (2027)
- USNWR Global: 497 (2026)

Regional – Overall
- QS Asia: 55 (2026)
- THE Asia: 84 (2026)
- USNWR Asia: 130 (2026)

Sunway University is ranked among the top institutions in Asia, and among the best universities in the world.

Sunway University has been ranked No.1 in the AppliedHE Private University Ranking: ASEAN 2026 for the third consecutive edition. The ranking recognises the university's sustained excellence in student learning experience, graduate employability, research, international outlook, community engagement, and academic reputation, with teaching and learning constituting the largest component of the AppliedHE assessment methodology.

Sunway University is internationally recognised as a leader in sustainability, consistently featuring in the Times Higher Education (THE) Impact Rankings, the QS Sustainability Rankings, and the UI GreenMetric World University Rankings.

In the THE Impact Rankings 2026, the university was ranked 45th globally, 124th in the UI GreenMetric World University Rankings 2025, while in the QS Sustainability Rankings 2026, it continues to rise significantly, recognising its contributions to the United Nations Sustainable Development Goals, environmental sustainability, social impact, and good governance.

At subject level, Sunway University is ranked by all three of the major international ranking organisations. In the QS World University Rankings by Subject 2025 the university was placed in the 51–100 band for Hospitality and Leisure Management and was ranked across ten subject areas in total. Times Higher Education placed the university in the 151–175 band for Business and Economics in its 2026 subject rankings, with further placements in Engineering, Psychology, Education Studies and the Social Sciences. In ShanghaiRanking's Global Ranking of Academic Subjects (ARWU) 2025 it was ranked 51–75 in the world for Business Administration and in the 201–300 band for both Economics and Energy Science and Engineering.

QS World University Rankings by Subject 2026
Subject	Global
Arts & Humanities
Art and Design	201–260
Engineering & Technology	451–500
Computer Science and Information Systems	501–550
Engineering – Chemical	351–400
Engineering – Electrical and Electronic	351–400
Engineering – Mechanical	501–575
Life Sciences & Medicine
Medicine	501–550
Natural Sciences
Environmental Sciences	401–450
Mathematics	501–600
Social Sciences & Management	365
Accounting and Finance	251–300
Business and Management Studies	201–250
Economics and Econometrics	351–400
Hospitality and Leisure Management	51–100

THE World University Rankings by Subject 2026
Subject	Global
Business & economics	151–175
Clinical & health	301–400
Computer science	301–400
Education studies	176–200
Engineering	176–200
Life sciences	301–400
Physical sciences	251–300
Psychology	176–200
Social sciences	201–250

ARWU Global Ranking of Academic Subjects 2025
Subject	Global
Engineering
Energy Science & Engineering	201–300
Social Sciences
Business Administration	51–75
Economics	201–300

== Student Life ==
The university hosts more than 100 clubs and societies. These include clubs for student leadership bodies, sports, recreation, and hobbies. There are also clubs for students of various nationalities, as Sunway has a significant number of international students, with students from more than 90 countries.

Beyond student organisations, Sunway frequently brings industry partners to campus for networking events, career days, and guest lectures. The university is also home to major student-led events, such as the annual SunFest and the Rock the Goals Concert, which supports the UN's Sustainable Development Goals (SDGs). Due to the frequency of campus events, Sunway has branded itself as the ‘Most Happening Campus’.

In 2024, Times Higher Education presented Sunway University with the Outstanding Support for Students award, in recognition of its exceptional commitment to student support and well-being, as well as the positive environment for students.

== Sustainability ==
Sustainability is a significant aspect of Sunway University's curriculum and identity. Under the S.U.S.T.A.I.N~~,~~.(Sunway University Sustainability-Focused Transformative Accessible Immersive and Networked) framework, all students are enrolled in sustainability-based modules in addition to their course-specific modules. Students are also engaged in activities that serve the community such as the Desa Mentari Community Development Programme, which serves the urban-poor community in Desa Mentari. The campus’ focus on sustainability and SDGs has led to it being branded as the Campus with a Conscience.

In terms of rankings recognition, the university is one of the 50 most sustainable universities in the world. The university also offers the Master in Sustainable Development Management Programme, the first of its kind in Malaysia.

The university is a hub for sustainability research, hosting the Jeffrey Sachs Center on Sustainable Development, the Future Cities Research Institute, and the Sunway Centre for Planetary Health, alongside a multitude of other research centres. Sunway University also serves as the host of the United Nations’ Sustainable Development Solutions Network Asia headquarters.

Notably, the university has implemented a zero-plastic policy on campus under its Zero Plastic Hour campaign, ensuring vendors and tenants of the campus grounds no longer utilise single-use plastics.

== Innovation and Entepreneurship ==
The university supports entrepreneurship, with one of its main initiatives being Sunway iLabs. Sunway iLabs is the innovation lab and Corporate Venture Capital (CVC) arm of Sunway Group, which exists in collaboration with Sunway University. iLabs identifies startups with high potential and supports them through partnership and investments. iLabs also runs the LaunchX programme, a university startup accelerator programme that turns validated ideas into fundable startups. LaunchX is available to current students of any Higher Education Institution across Malaysia.

Under the Xplorer Hub, the university's interdisciplinary elective platform, students from any academic discipline can enroll in entrepreneurship-focused modules, including Startup Foundry and Innovation Discovery and Validation Studio. The university also offers an entrepreneurship degree, the Bachelor of Arts (Honours) Entrepreneurship.

== Industry Engagement ==
To support its graduate outcomes, the university maintains an active emphasis on industry engagement. Consequently, Sunway University was ranked number one in Malaysia for graduate employability for five consecutive years (2022–2026) in the Talentbank National Graduate Employability Index.This index measures top employers’ preferred universities in terms of hiring. The university also holds a 100% employment rate as per the Malaysian Ministry of Higher Education's Tracer Study. The university frequently hosts events that invite industry leaders and companies to its campus, such as the Get Hired Career Fair and Employer Day events. As part of the wider Sunway Group, students are also exposed to the various industry branches Sunway is present in. These include:

- Real Estate - Sunway Property (Sunway Berhad - Property Division)
- Construction - Sunway Construction Group Berhad (SunCon)
- Healthcare - Sunway Healthcare Group (Sunway Healthcare Holdings Berhad)
- Education - Sunway Education Group (includes Sunway University and Sunway Colleges)
- Malls (Retail) - Sunway Malls (operates Sunway Pyramid, Sunway Velocity Mall, Sunway Carnival Mall)
- Hospitality - Sunway Hotels & Resorts (operates Sunway Resort Hotel, Sunway Pyramid Hotel, Sunway Hotel Big Box)
- Leisure - Sunway Theme Parks (operates Sunway Lagoon and Lost World of Tambun)
- REIT & Real Estate Funds - Sunway REIT (Sunway Real Estate Investment Trust)
- Trading & Manufacturing - Sunway Marketing (Sunway Trading & Manufacturing Division)
- Building Materials - Sunway Building Materials (comprising Sunway Paving Solutions, Sunway VCP, and Sunway Spun Piles)
- Quarry - Sunway Quarry (Sunway Quarry Industries)
- Investment & Financial Services - Sunway Capital / Sunway Ventures
- Digital - Sunway Digital / Sunway iLabs

A flagship offering is the Success X-Factor Coaching Model, whereby all students of Sunway University are assigned coaches from the industry to provide them with career guidance. Coaches include:

- Chef Wan
- Dato' Sri Idris Jala
- Datuk Nicol David
- Evan Cheah Yean Shin
- Professor Dato' Dr Elizabeth Lee
- Tan Sri Dr. Jeffrey Cheah
- Tan Sri Dr Jemilah Mahmood
- Venon Tian
- YB Steven Sim Chee Keong

== Community Engagement ==
As part of its commitment to sustainability, Sunway University is involved with several community engagement initiatives. The most significant one is its Desa Mentari Community Development Programme. As part of this programme, Sunway organises and participates in activities that contribute to the urban-poor community in the Desa Mentari area. The university aims to contribute to long-term development instead of short-term solutions, running vocational training programmes and creating a community learning hub. Special initiatives such as back-to-school programmes are also held.

The university also regularly holds fundraising events for various societies. In 2026, it successfully raised RM 4,880 in contribution to the Malaysian Association for the Blind (MAB), as part of its ‘Claws For A Cause’ claw machine game. The Sunway Student Volunteers club also regularly engages in community activities, organising 324 events in 2025, ranging from environmental clean-up activities to wildlife awareness programmes.

Via the Sunway Education Group and the Jeffrey Cheah Foundation, Sunway University offers various scholarships to students who are in need, including children from welfare homes or poor communities.

== Libraries and Learning Resources ==
The Tun Hussein Onn Sunway Library occupies an area of 72,000 square feet distributed across three levels of the main university building. While primarily serving the institution's students and staff, the library is also accessible to the general public. The library features an Extended Hour Study Area that remains open late into the night, often until 2:00 AM or 3:00 AM. The library also has a large selection of research materials available via online access.

The university also utilises digital resources in teaching and learning. Through Sunway iLabs the university integrates Paradox of Theron (POT), an award-winning, game-based online learning platform. Sunway also offers accredited Online Distance Learning (ODL), a format that uses digital technology to deliver remote instruction and facilitate interaction between students and educators.

These digital initiatives are centralized via eLearn, a virtual learning environment powered by the Blackboard Ultra platform. Recognised as a Premier Digital Tech Institution by the Malaysia Digital Economy Corporation (MDEC), the university also features specialised digital spaces. These include immersive virtual reality (VR) laboratories for engineering and cultural heritage preservation, as well as the House of Multimodal Evolution (H.O.M.E.) robotics lab.

== Notable Alumni ==
- Steven Sim Chee Keong: Minister of Entrepreneur and Cooperatives Development and MP for Bukit Mertajam.
- Jenny Choy Tsi Jen: Deputy Speaker of the Perak State Legislative Assembly and MLA for Canning.
- Noor Neelofa Mohd Noor: High-profile actress, television host, and founder of the modest wear empire Naelofar Hijab.
- Heidy Quah Gaik Ru: Founder of Refuge for the Refugees and the first Malaysian woman to receive the Queen's Young Leader Award.
- Leong Mun Yee: Celebrated retired diver, four-time Olympian, and co-winner of Malaysia's first-ever World Championship diving medal.

== Gallery ==
Campus
360 Lecture Theatre

FIFA-certified Football Field

Main University Building

Sunway Square Building

Recital Hall

University Building View From Entrance

Sunway Square Grandstand

Destiny Statue

== See also ==
- List of universities in Malaysia
