= Heidy Quah =

Malaysian social rights advocate

- 柯玉莉
- Education: University of Hertfordshire
- Awards: Queen's Young Leader Award

Heidy Quah (Chinese: 柯玉莉; pinyin: Kē Yùlì) is a Malaysian social rights advocate. She is the founder and chief of Refuge for the Refugees, a non-profit organization that aims to raise awareness on the pressing conditions of refugees and provide them support. She was the first Malaysian woman to receive the Queen's Young Leader Award.

Quah was born and raised in Damansara Jaya. She graduated with a bachelor's degree in Accounting and Finance from the University of Hertfordshire. Prior to establishing Refuge for the Refugees, she was planning to work at an Accounting firm.

== Advocacy ==
After finishing high school, Quah decided to volunteer as an English teacher at a refugee school in Kuala Lumpur. It was cramped and congested, and food was also insufficient. The school was distant to the dwelling-place of the refugees and they were often stopped by authorities. Nevertheless, the children were persistent in obtaining education. It made Quah question herself as she used to beg to be absent in school. The circumstances of the refugees made her feel privileged.

The headmaster later informed Quah that the centre would be closed due to lack of funds—the United Nations Refugee Agency decided not to renew its sponsorship. Together with fellow volunteer Andrea Prisha, Quah sold food door-to-door and utilized social media to raise funds. They were able to keep the school operating for 6 months. Afterwards, in 2012, Quah established Refuge for the Refugees together with friend Andrea Prisha. Malaysia does not endorse the Refugee Convention and Protocol, so the organization provides refugees an access to basic education and healthcare. They provide vocational and entrepreneurship training so they will be able to sustain themselves. The organization also rescues refugees from detention camps and human trafficking syndicates. They also visit refugee communities and donate hardware and funds.

Quah juggled finishing her university studies while directing the organization. She studied Burmese and Chin to be able to communicate with the refugees. She also undertook Muay Thai classes to ensure her safety as rescuing refugees from trafficking rings has exposed her to law offenders.

Quah remains vocal in speaking out against misconceptions and prejudice towards refugees. She heads the organization's awareness campaigns which are conducted in malls and universities. Refuge for the Refugees has established 10 schools in Malaysia and 25 in Myanmar. They have educated thousands of refugee students.

In 2022, Quah joined Entry Point, a social enterprise in Malaysia providing ethical recruitment services to hire migrant workers. She is managing Pinkcollar's service expansion to serve Indonesian migrant workers and Malaysia's manufacturing sector, in advocacy for better labour conditions for migrant workers in Malaysia.
