= Sunway College =

Private college in Subang Jaya, Malaysia

- Kolej Sunway (Malay) 双威学院 (Chinese)
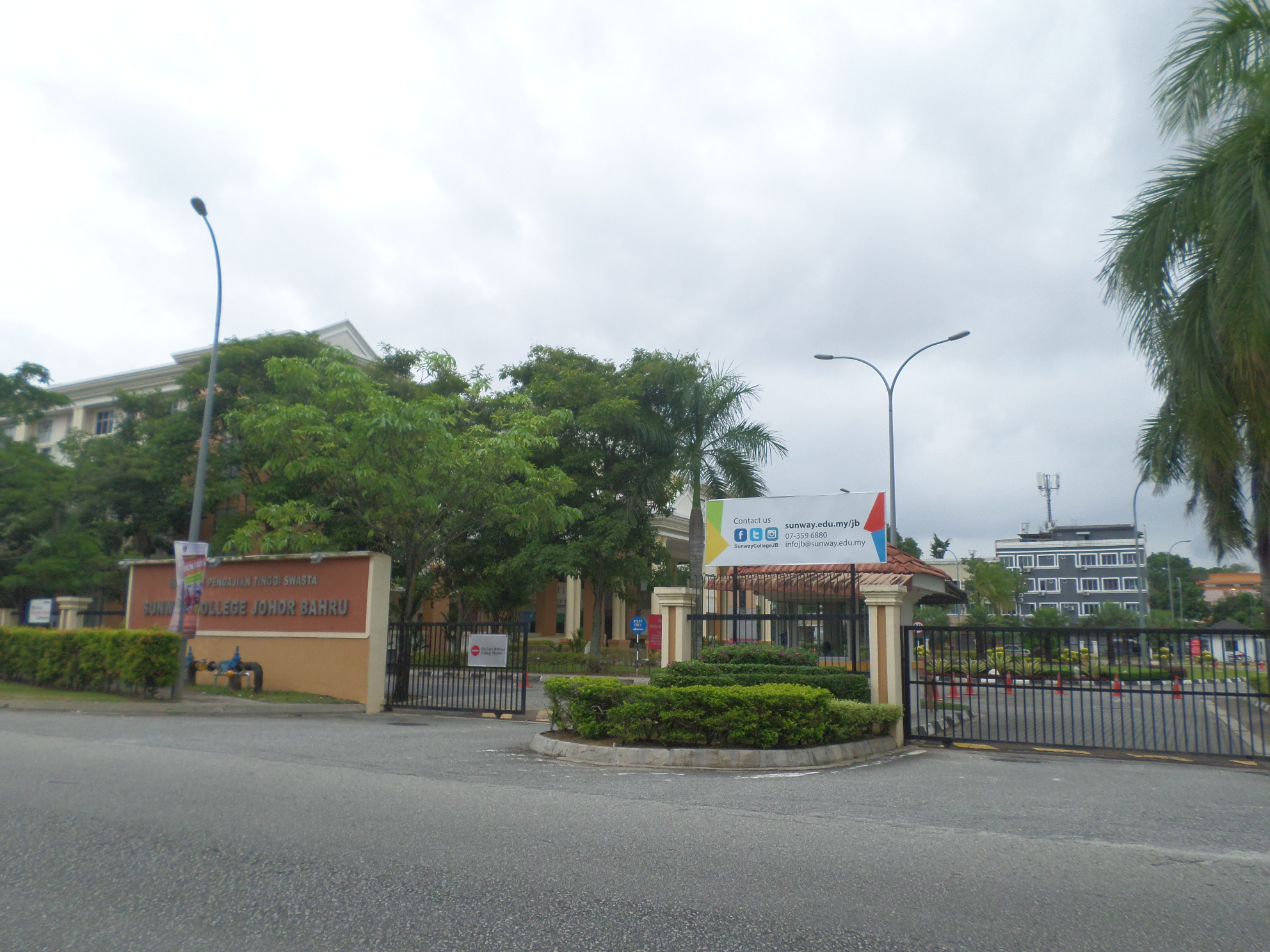
- Sunway College Johor Bahru
- Motto: Fortuna Eruditis Favet ("Fortune Favours the Prepared Mind")
- Type: Private
- Established: 25 July 1987
- Founder: Tan Sri Dato' Seri Dr Jeffrey Cheah Fook Ling, AO
- Affiliations: DoE Western Australia; DfE South Australia; Cambridge; EDU Ontario; Sunway University; Monash University; Victoria University; ACCA; ICAEW; MAPCU
- Provost: Dr Khatijah Khalid (Bandar Sunway)
- Principal: Mrs Hor Po Choo (Johor Bahru); Wan Nor Haliza Wan Harun(Ipoh); Mr Joseph(Kuching)
- Location: Bandar Sunway, Subang Jaya, Selangor, Malaysia; 3.0681°N 101.6041°E
- Colours: Gold, Black, and Light Blue
- Website: sunwaycollege.edu.my

Sunway College is a private college based in Bandar Sunway, Subang Jaya, Selangor, Malaysia. It was established on 25 July 1987 by Jeffrey Cheah. It has a 10-hectare (24 acre) campus comprising academic and residential blocks adjacent to the Sunway Lagoon theme park.

In addition to the Bandar Sunway campus, there are also colleges in Johor Bahru, Ipoh, Kuching and in Kuala Lumpur @ Velocity. The college offers a number of international sixth form, university foundation, diploma and professional courses. In some campuses, Victoria University, Australia undergraduate courses are offered as external and/or twinning courses.

== History ==
In 1987, Sunway College was established by its Founder, Tan Sri Dr Jeffrey Cheah, AO. Sunway College offers Malaysian and international students the opportunity of obtaining foreign university qualifications from the UK, Australia and the USA here in Malaysia. Sunway College was upgraded to Sunway University College in 2004.

In January 2011, at the time when Sunway University College became Sunway University, Sunway College was re-formed as an education provider of internationally recognised pre-university, diploma programmes, professional accounting programmes as well as undergraduate twinning degree programme with Victoria University, Australia.

Sunway College and Sunway University are part of the Sunway Education Group, fully owned and governed by the Jeffrey Cheah Foundation (JCF). The Foundation, launched in March 2010 operates via the Sunway Education Trust Fund which was set up in 1997. Sunway College channels its surpluses to provide scholarships and financial support to deserving students. To date, a total of more than RM538 million in scholarships has been disbursed by the Foundation to thousands of deserving students.

== Pre-University Studies ==
At the pre-university studies level, Sunway College offers grade 12 or matriculation studies options from the UK, Australia, Canada together with its own home-grown programmes. The pre-university programmes offered are:

- Australian Matriculation (AUSMAT)
- Cambridge GCE Advanced-Level (A-Level)
- Canadian International Matriculation Programme (CIMP)
- Monash University Foundation Year (MUFY)
- Sunway Foundation in Arts (FIA)
- Sunway Foundation in Science (FIST)

== Sunway Diploma Studies ==
Sunway College offers 8 diploma programmes & 2 certificate studies designed to prepare students for careers in the various fields of study. The programmes are:

- Diploma of Accountancy
- Diploma in Finance
- Diploma in Communication
- Diploma in Interactive New Media
- Diploma in Business Administration
- Diploma in Information Technology
- Diploma in Computer Science
- Diploma in Digital Creative Content
- Certificate in Business Studies
- Certificate in Digital Creative Content
