= Selangor Philharmonic Orchestra =

- Orchestra
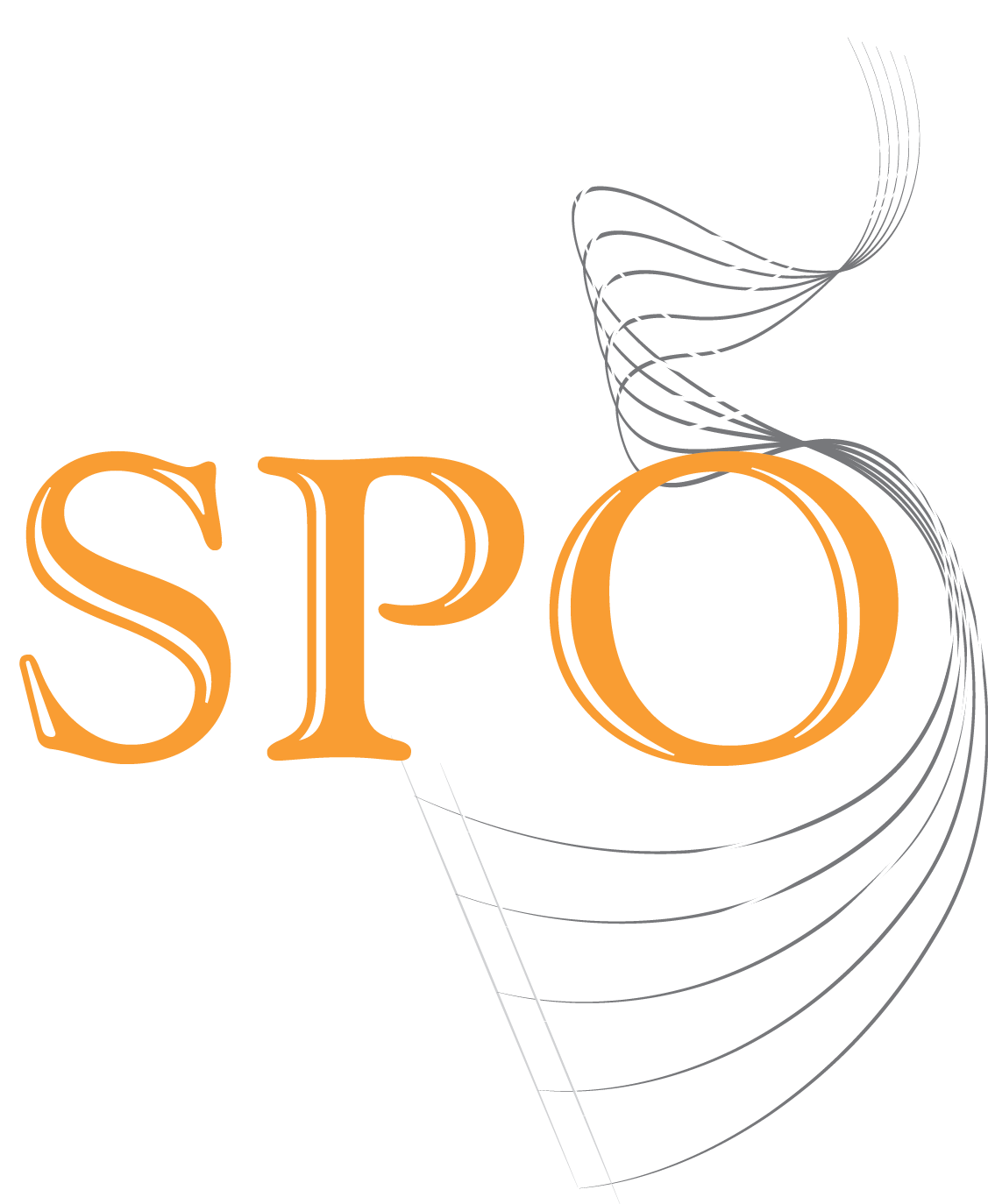
- Short name: SPO
- Founded: 2012
- Location: Selangor, Malaysia
- Principal conductor: Chan Ling Chee
- Website: spo.org.my

Not to be mistaken for the Philharmonic Society of Selangor, also known as the Selangor Philharmonic Society

The Selangor Philharmonic Orchestra (SPO) is an amateur orchestra based in Selangor, Malaysia. It was founded in 2012 by Chan Ling Chee to spread the interest on classical music throughout Selangor and to help educate young musicians.

The orchestra made its debut in June 2012 with "Chapter One: Thunveil," conducted by their principal conductor, Chan Ling Chee. The orchestra presents their main concert of each season as a "Chapter" performing a wide variety of music but centering on classical and romantic repertoire. The orchestra frequently performs with local soloists and has been featured numerous times in local publications such as The Star.

The orchestra also includes the Selangor Philharmonic Youth Orchestra (SPYO), where young musicians can perform in an orchestra.
