= Chung Ling High School =

Private school in Penang, Malaysia (1917–1955)

Chung Ling National Type Chinese High School
- 锺灵国民型华文中学

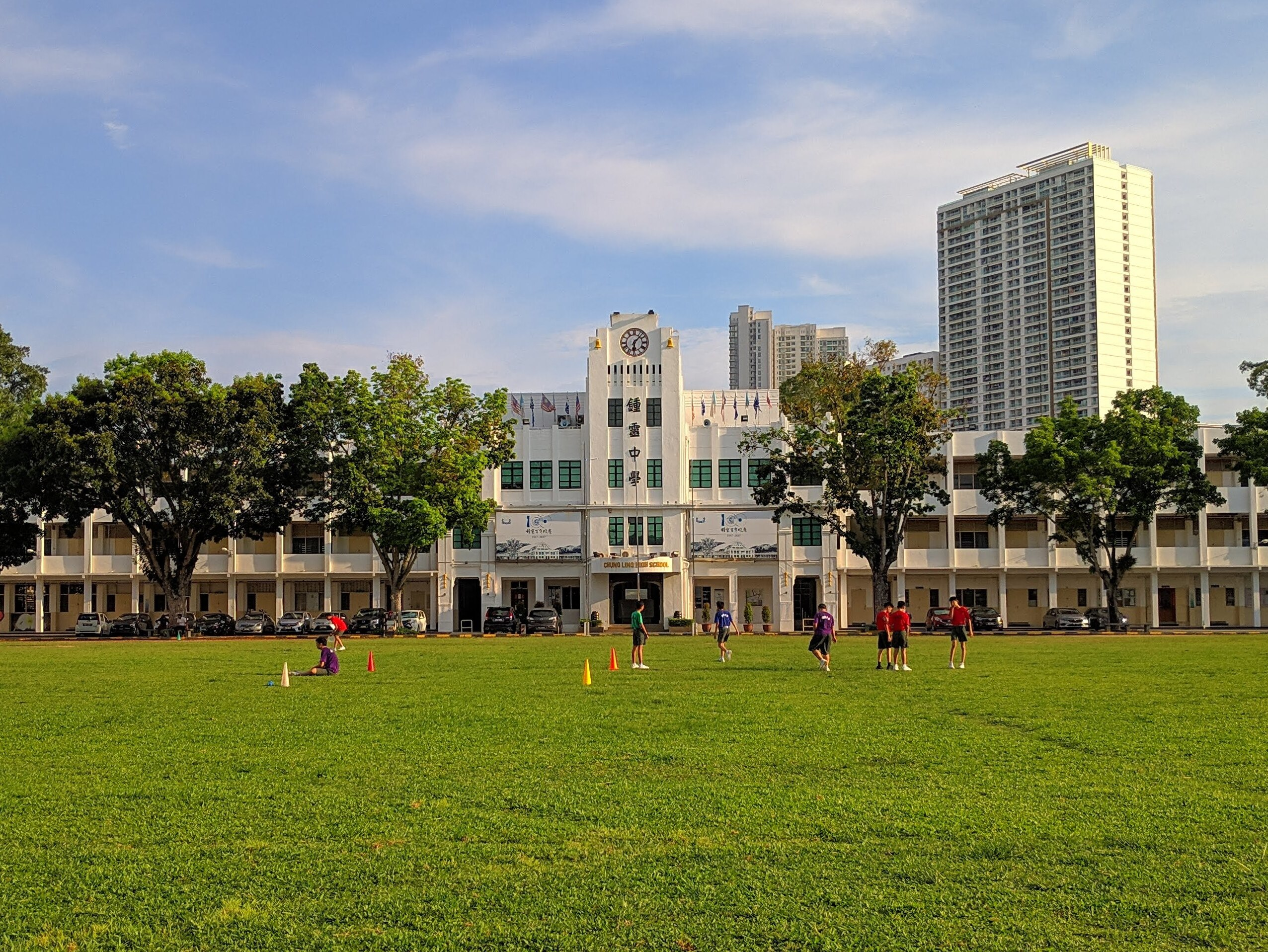
- Chung Ling High School, 2022

Location
- Air Itam, George Town, Northeast District, Penang, 11400; Malaysia; 5°24′13.35″N 100°17′42.67″E

Information
- Type: National-type Chinese secondary school
- Motto: I Cherish My Chung Ling 爱吾锺灵
- Established: 9 February 1917; 109 years ago
- School district: Northeast
- Director: Koay Hean Eng
- Principal: Khor Chin Soon
- Teaching staff: 169 (2025)
- Gender: Boys (Form 1 to Form 5); Mixed (Form 6)
- Enrollment: 2,069 (2025)
- Classes: 80 (2025)
- Area: 11 acres (4.5 hectares)
- Colours: Dark-blue and ochre
- Affiliations: Chung Ling Butterworth High School; Chung Ling Private High School
- Website: https://www.clhs.edu.my/bbs.php

Chung Ling National Type Chinese High School
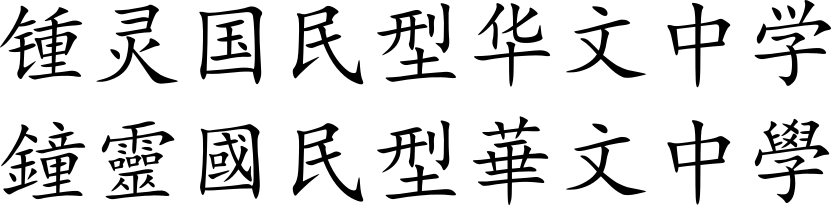
- Chung Ling National Type Chinese High School in Simplified Chinese (top) and Traditional Chinese character (below)
- Traditional Chinese: 鍾靈國民型華文中學
- Simplified Chinese: 锺灵国民型华文中学
Transcriptions
Standard Mandarin
- Hanyu Pinyin: Zhōng Líng Guó Mín Xíng Huá Wén Zhōng Xué
Southern Min
- Hokkien POJ: Chong-lêng Kok-bîn-hêng Hôa-bûn Tiong-o̍h

Chung Ling High School
- Traditional Chinese: 鍾靈中學
- Simplified Chinese: 锺灵中学
Transcriptions
Standard Mandarin
- Hanyu Pinyin: Zhōng Líng Zhōng Xué
Southern Min
- Hokkien POJ: Chong-lêng tiong-o̍h

Chung Ling High School, officially the Chung Ling National Type Chinese High School (Chinese: 锺灵国民型华文中学; Malay: Sekolah Menengah Jenis Kebangsaan Cina Chung Ling) is a National-type Chinese secondary school in George Town, Penang, Malaysia. It was initially established in 1917 as a primary school, and later became a junior high school in 1923, becoming the oldest extant Chinese high school in Malaysia. Following the merger of The Chinese High School in Singapore in 2005, Chung Ling High School became the oldest surviving Chinese high school in Southeast Asia.

Chung Ling High School was the only Chinese school in Penang to retain its all-male students only tradition. It was a hub of educated Chinese intellects, and was known to harbor radical political thoughts, from both the Kuomintang and the Chinese Communist Party during the Chinese Civil War. In the 1930s, the students of the school, as a response of the Japanese invasion of Manchuria and China, held anti-Japanese protests and demonstrations. During the Japanese occupation of Malaya, their past anti-Japanese sentiment resulted in retaliation by the Japanese occupation government, mostly in the form of forceful disbandment of classes, manhunts and a purge of its former staffs and alumni.

The school reopened in 1946 following the end of the Second World War, and achieved its present academic peak during the 1950s and early 1960s, under the tenure of headmaster David Chen (1898–1952), a Chinese education reformer, as the leading Chinese institution of higher education in Southeast Asia. The teachers within the school were noted poets, leading intellects and university professors. Numerous graduates later became educators, Olympic athletes, ministers and important politicians of both Singapore and Malaysia.

Chung Ling High School became a public-school under the British colonial government in 1956. As a result, a breakaway private school, Chung Ling Private High School, was founded in 1962. In 1967, the school was the first Chinese school in the country to introduce pre-university courses (Form 6). Computerization of the administration in the school was launched in 1983, the first in the country. In 1984, the government school was separated once more, forming Chung Ling Butterworth High School, a Butterworth-based Co-Ed high school for students based in Seberang Perai.

Chung Ling has been categorized as a public school for students of excellent grades. It is designated as a Cluster School of Excellence since 2013, a recognition for the academic performances of the school, and one of four Chinese "controlled-schools" (admission-only under invitation) in Penang.

== History ==
=== Background ===
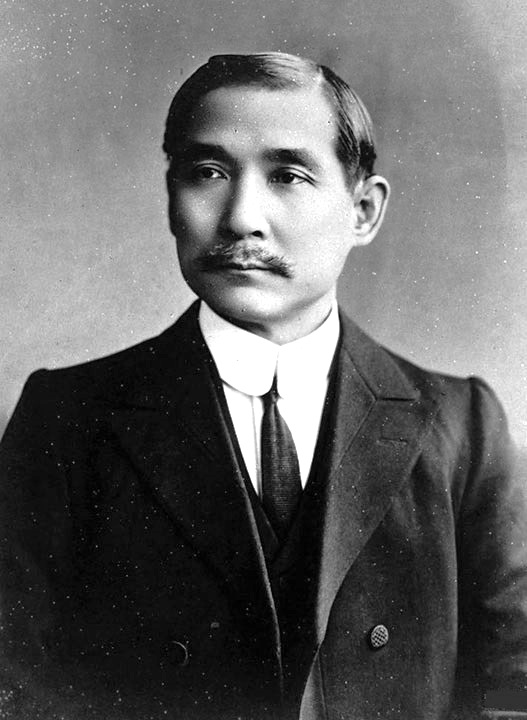
Sun Yat Sen, leader of the Tongmenghui and later the Republic of China

During the early 20th century, there was an influx of Chinese immigrants at the Straits Settlements, where a large proportion of them later resided in Penang. The events within China, after the Boxer Rebellion triggered political echoes locally, mostly within the city of George Town. Penang was designated as the headquarters of the Nanyang Tongmenghui (later Kuomintang) between 1909 and 1911. 29 Penang Tongmenghui members, as well as Sun Yat Sen, leader of the Tongmenghui and later the revolutions in China, formed the Penang Philomathic Union (Chinese: 槟城阅书报社）in December 1908, at Sun's residence at 404 Dato Keramat Road as a political wing of the Tongmenghui in Southeast Asia.

Chinese education in Penang (especially secondary-education), despite having establishments as early as 1819 (the earliest in modern-day Malaysia), was seen as undeveloped and outdated by the early 1900s, in contrast to established English institutions such as the Penang Free School (1816), the St. Xavier's Institution (1852), and the Anglo-Chinese School (1891, now the Methodist Boys School). Reforming and expanding the reach of Chinese education, among the views of local educators and prominent social figures, was seen as a major step to improve the life standards and literacy rates of the Chinese people in Malaya and the Straits Settlements (Nanyang). Newly formed Chinese pro-revolutionary institutions highlighted the philosophy of the Three Principles of the People (San Min Zhu-i, Chinese: 三民主義) as the basis of their teachings, to show a positive plight on the political changes led by the revolutionaries, and to hope for a shift in local support, both morally and financially for the cause. Royalist sentiment was still sympathized by a large proportion of the local Chinese population prior to the Xinhai Revolution.

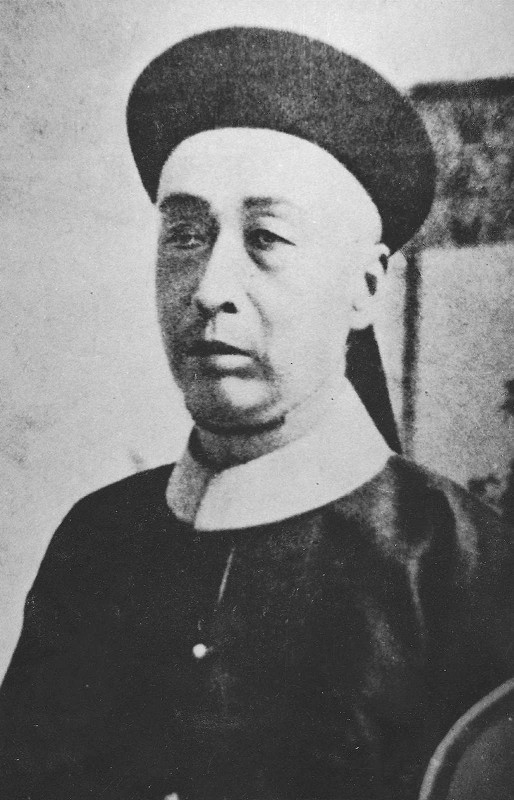
Cheong Fatt Tze, Chinese businessman and politician

In 1904, Chung Hwa School (Chinese: 中華學校, now Chung Hwa Confucian High School) was formed by Cheong Fatt Tze. It was the first modern Chinese school in Southeast Asia, adopting Vernacular Chinese as the standard curriculum. In the following two decades, there was a surge of newly founded high schools throughout Malaya. In February 1919, the first Chinese high school in Malaya, the Penang Hua Chiao High School (Chinese: 檳城華僑中學) was established at the Ping Zhang Chamber (Chinese: 平章會館, now the Penang Chinese Town Hall) by Tye Siok Guan, son of Tye Kee Yoon. On 21 March 1919, the first Chinese high school in Singapore, the Singapore Nanyang Overseas Chinese Middle School (Chinese: 新加坡南洋华侨中学校, later The Chinese High School) was founded in Singapore by Tan Kah Kee.

=== Formation and first years ===
Plans for a Tongmenghui-funded Chinese institution in Penang first appeared as early as 1908. In 1915, five members of the Penang Philomathic Union – Tan Xin Cheng (1881–1924), an important member and financier of the Tongmenghui and one of the founders of the Kwong Wah Daily; Lim Joo Teik (1864–1930) a prominent member of the local Hokkien community; Khoo Beng Cheang (d.1935–1946), Tongmenghui member and later Vice President of the Rubber Trade Association of Penang in 1930; Khaw Seng Lee (1886–1967), jeweller and rubber tycoon, once nicknamed the "King of Gold" (Chinese: 金王); and Chee Yeong It, political writer and publisher, spearheaded efforts to organize the creation of a privately funded institution. It was decided that the formation of the institution will involve primary education. The school was named Chung Ling (鍾靈), a name proposed by Chee. The name was later set as Chung Ling School, the first iteration of the present institution.

Founders of the Chung Ling School, 1915–1917
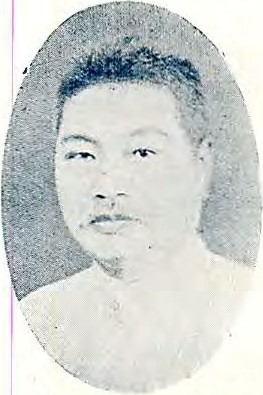
Khoo Beng Cheang

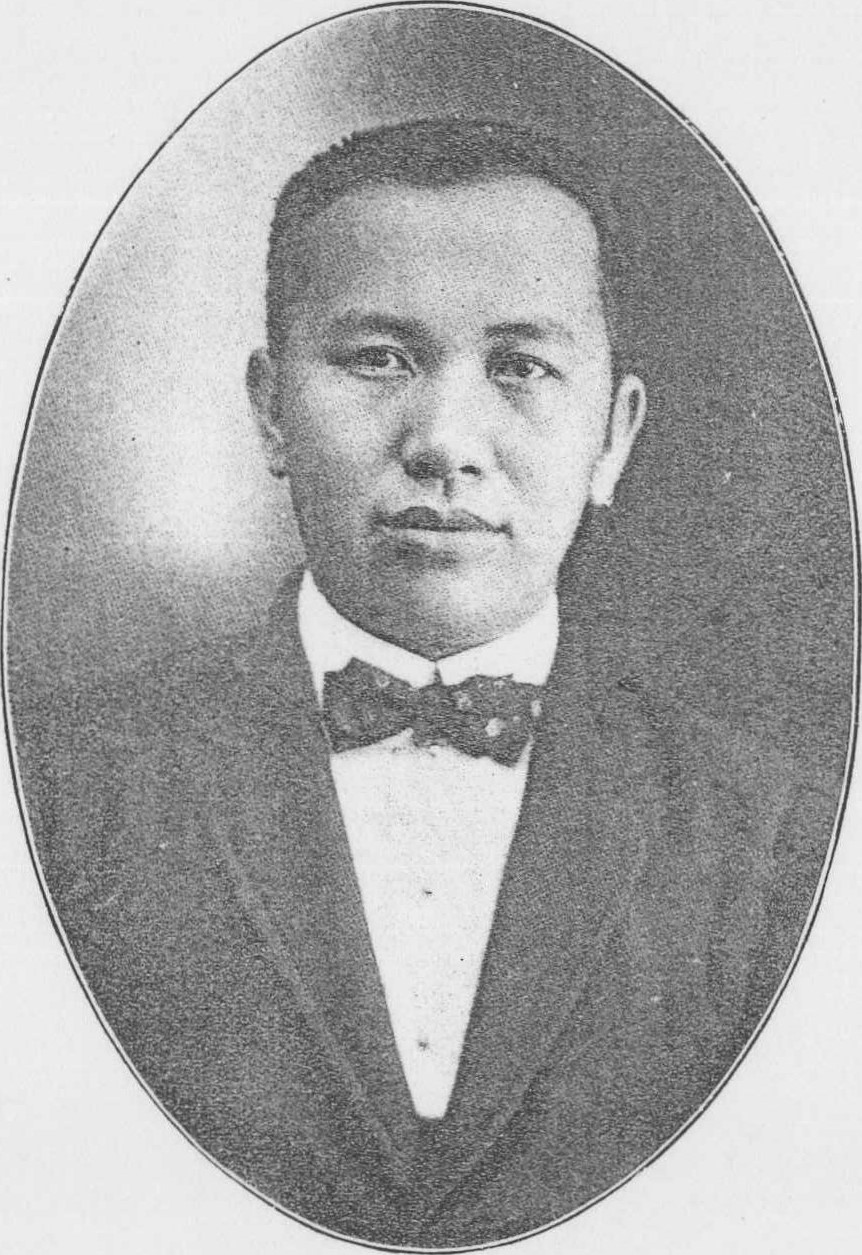
Khaw Seng Lee

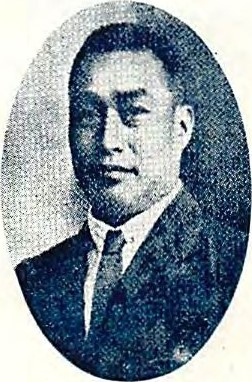
Tan Xin Cheng

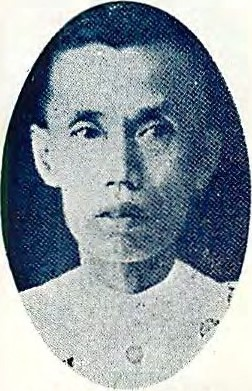
Chee Yeong It

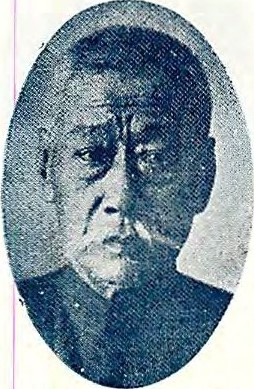
Lin Joo Teik

Classes were first held on 9 February 1917 at the second floor of the shophouse owned by the Penang Philomathic Union at 16 Malay Street (Chinese: 台牛后十六號). It was purchased along with 18 Malay Street nearby, after the operations of the Southeast Asia Tongmenghui was moved from Singapore to Penang in 1909, the prior being an office and the latter for Kwong Wah Daily. Lim Joo Teik and Chee Yeong It was elected as the first chairman and deputy chairman of the Board of Governors respectively. Goh Ah Long (1891–1943), an immigrated teacher from Zhao'an County, Fujian was appointed as the first headmaster of the school at the age of 24. Wu was noted to be a prolific author and an avid member within the Tongmenghui. During his tenure as headmaster, he was invited by the Kwong Wah Daily as their managing director. The school had 81 students within the first year, under the supervision of three teachers.

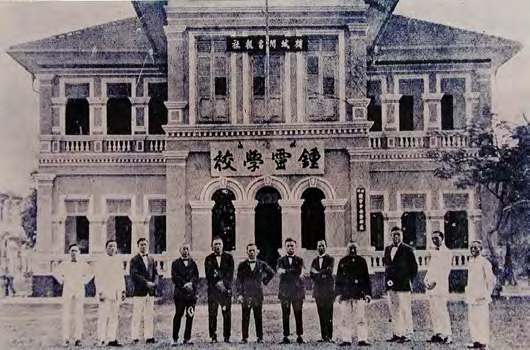
The "Xiao Lan Ting" mansion at 65 Macalister Road, later the campus of Chung Ling High School for 17 years. Photographed circa between 1918 and 1921.

The following year, there were 130 students. Previously, when the school was first held the year before, the shophouse at 16 Malay Street was remarked as being "small and crowded". Visiting scholars urged for the school to move to larger premises for better accommodation. The Penang Philomathic Union decided (upon large donations from the members of the society), to purchase the mansion at 65 Macalister Road at a hefty sum of 20-thousand Straits dollars in June 1918. The mansion was formerly a club by the name of Xiao Lan Ting (Chinese: 小蘭亭; lit. '(The) Little Orchid House'). The school and the teacher's dormitory was to occupy the second floor of the mansion, while the ground floor became the headquarters of the Penang Philomathic Union. By 1919, there were 170 students. Khoo Beng Cheang was elected as the new chairman of the Board of Governors, replacing Lim Joo Teik. Chee Yeong It remained as the deputy chairman.

In January 1921, under the decision of the Board of Governors, Wang Tsuntong was appointed as the new headmaster, replacing Goh. Not long after, he tabled the first motto of the school, Justice, Honesty, Tireless, Sparing (Chinese: 公诚勤俭), which was said to be carved on a piece of wood. Rising politicization of Chinese schools (including Chung Ling) after the end of the First World War culminated fears from the governments of nationalistic sentiments within the colonies. By 1919, in response to the May Fourth Movement in China, students from Chinese schools held anti-Japanese demonstrations and boycotts of Japanese goods throughout Malaya. The radical actions alerted the British colonial government, who previously had a laissez-faire attitude towards Chinese institution from funding concerns. On 13 October 1920, the government introduced the Education Ordinance of 1920 (Chinese: 1920年学校注册法令), aimed at controlling the expansion of Chinese institutions and its politicization through forceful registrations of existing schools across Malaya. The bill was passed on 27 October 1920. It was met with extreme dissatisfaction and opposition from the Chinese community. Wang, along with the teachers of the school, mass-resigned to protest against the bill. In January 1922, to comply with the 1920 Education Ordinance, the Board of Governors abolished the post of headmaster and instead opted for a provost (Chinese: 教務長) to lead the school's affairs. Wang Ji-ou was appointed as the first provost of the school in the same month.

=== Transition into a secondary school ===
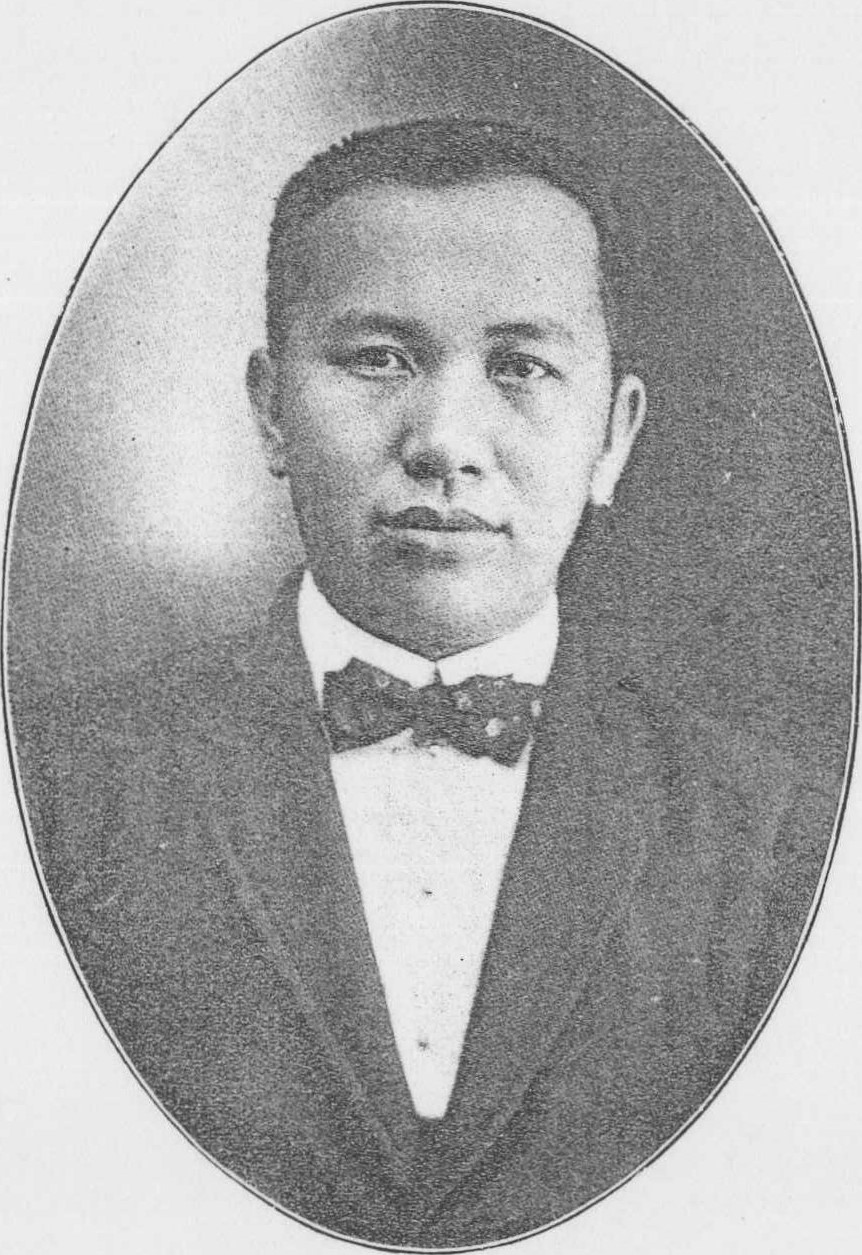
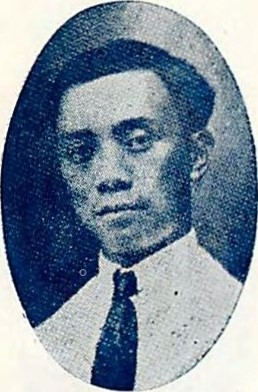
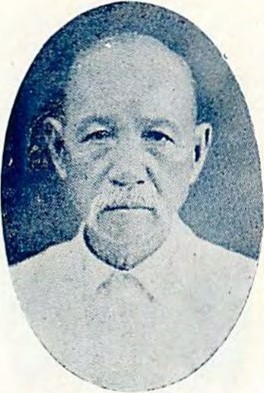
Khaw Seng Lee (left), Lim Fuquan (middle) and Wang Wenqu (right) led the 12-man preparation committee for the formation of a high school under Chung Ling School.

The closure of the Penang Hua Chiao High School in 1921 from financial difficulties and lack of leadership after the death of Tye Kee Yoon had negative implications on the development of early secondary education in Penang. There was a dire need at the time for a replacement school to cope with the rising amount of newly graduated primary students. Tan Xin Cheng proposed in an article (dated 15 December 1920) to expand the primary-school into a middle-school. On 11 November 1922, a meeting was set up by Khaw Seng Lee (by then the chairman of the Board of Governors), Lim Fuquan and Wang Wenqu (educator and revolutionary), and 9 other prominent Chinese figures to discuss the issue. Wang Deqing, the deputy chairman of the Board of Governors, suggested the conversion of the school to include secondary education. The plan was subsequently agreed and a preparation committee was formed. The school was renamed, to the "Chung Ling High School" (Chinese: 鍾靈中學校). Equipment of the school was supported by the now defunct Hua Chiao High School. On 20 January 1923, Chung Ling High School commenced its courses, officially becoming a joint-primary and secondary school. Ko in Beng (顾因明, b.1881), a graduate of Fudan and a former teacher at Pudong High School, was invited to be the first joint-provost of Chung Ling High School.

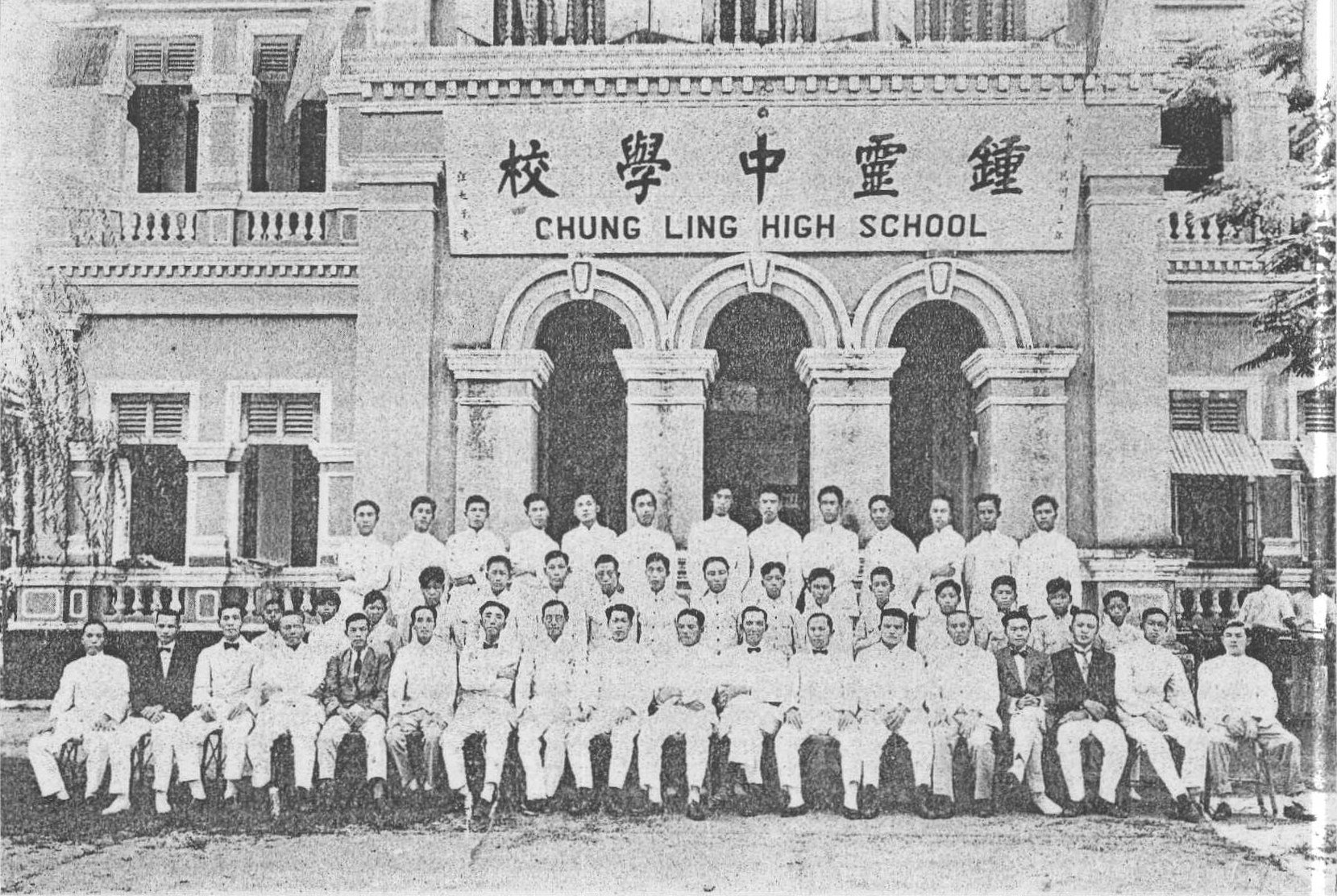
The first graduates of the high school, October 1925

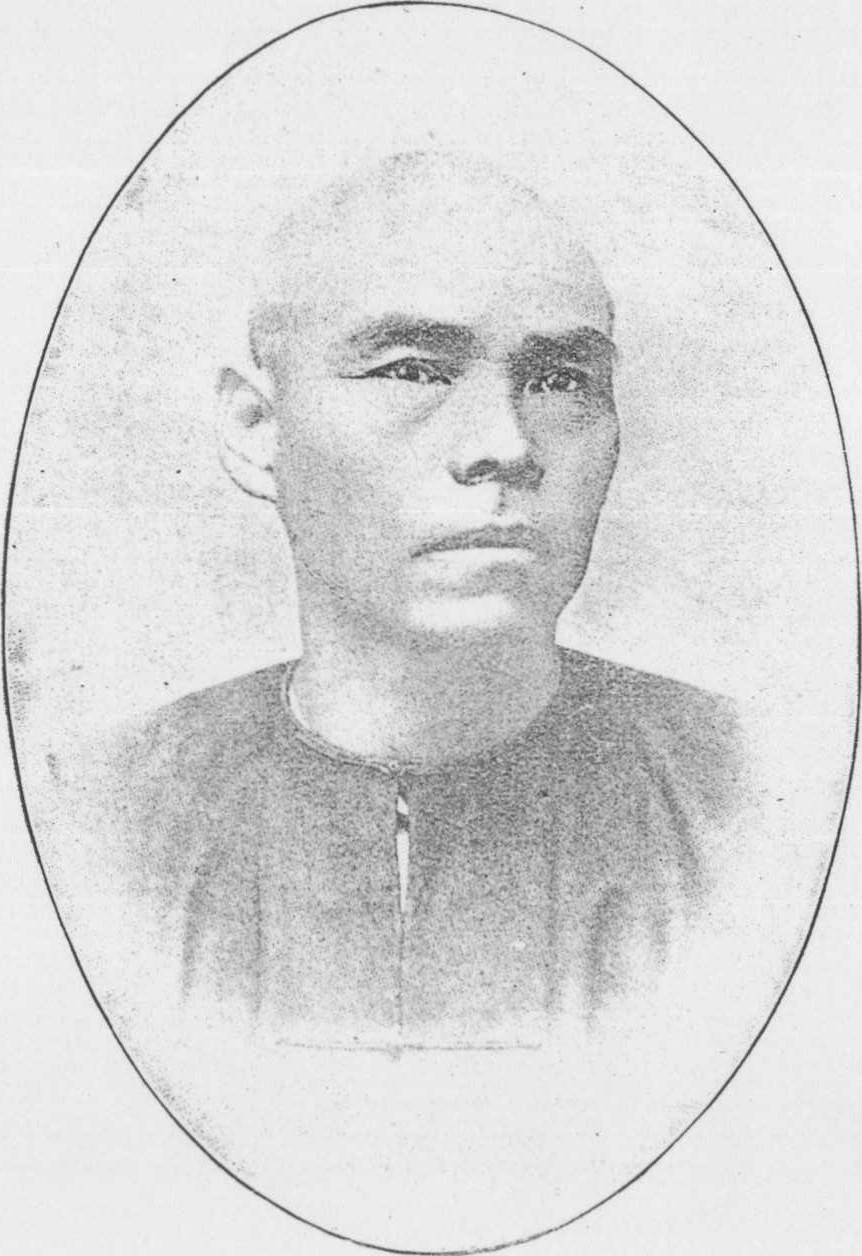
Phuah Hin Leong (1844–1901), also known as Lim Choo Guan, was a merchant and owner of the Khie Heng Bee rice mills.

Ko was a poet and was employed as an English translator by the Straits government. His tenure laid the importance of both Chinese and English as standard subjects, combining the best of two into a mixed curriculum system. English classes were introduced for the first time to raise the language standards of the students for practical usage. This system is still widely implemented in the school today. In 1924, he established a new motto for the high school: 誠愛 (English: Honesty and Love or Honesty and Passion). The high school had 182 students and 9 teachers, covering five different grades, ranging from two years of pre-secondary education to three years of lower-secondary education. Early education reports at the time recorded the school's tuition fees at 4 yuan for lower-secondary courses and 2-and-a-half yuan for pre-secondary courses. Ten percent of the students were exempted from payment. Entrance exams, on the other hand were paid by the Board of Governors. The following year, to counter the ever-expanding enrollment, an expansion was made on the campus, involving two buildings east of the site. They were donated by the trust-holders of the trustee of the late Phuah Hin Leong (1844–1901). In October 1926, the school published its first annual. In May 1927, Ko resigned from health issues. He was replaced by Tang Tong Hou, who resigned in February 1929 to return to China. Ooi Cheow Cheng (1887–1962, alias Zao Liu) became the new provost in August 1930. Ooi, a student of the Nanyang Public School (1896–1904) from Haimen, was the founder and the first headmaster of the Haimen Middle School in Jiangsu, but was forced to resign amidst student protests and left China for Malaya shortly after. In December 1930, Chung Ling Old Boys Association, the first alumni organisation for the school was formed at Abu Siti Lane. During Ooi's tenure as provost, the campus underwent some extensions under efforts by the Old Boys Association and the Board of Governors. Ooi resigned in June 1931 to visit his family in China. His return to China was not welcomed and promptly moved to Shanghai to work as a librarian in the library of Shanghai Jiao Tong University (SJTU).

On 18 July 1931, David Chen was appointed as provost, replacing Huang. Further expansions on the campus were made in 1932, this time with funding from the local government. Multiple buildings west of the campus were purchased and converted into a library and multiple laboratories. During the turn of the 1930s, the insistence of the school on focusing on both English and Chinese education garnered a solid reputation as a well-established high school. This brought in foreign students across Asia, notably from neighbouring Siam and Singapore. The influx of new students heavily strained the usage of the recently expanded campuses, and in 1933 it was finally decided (under a mutual agreement between David Chen and the Board of Governors) to construct an entirely new campus from scratch in a new location. A twelve-men development committee was formed after approval. Calls for donations for the construction began and shortly after, the acquisition of a plot of land (designated as Lot 133) 11 acres (4.5 hectares) in size near Kampung Ayer Itam was made. Construction commenced on 10 October 1934, in conjunction with the National Day of the Republic of China (Double Tenth Day), marked by a stone-laying ceremony hosted by Khoo Beng Cheang. The cost of the construction in its entirety was estimated to be over 300-thousand Malayan dollars.

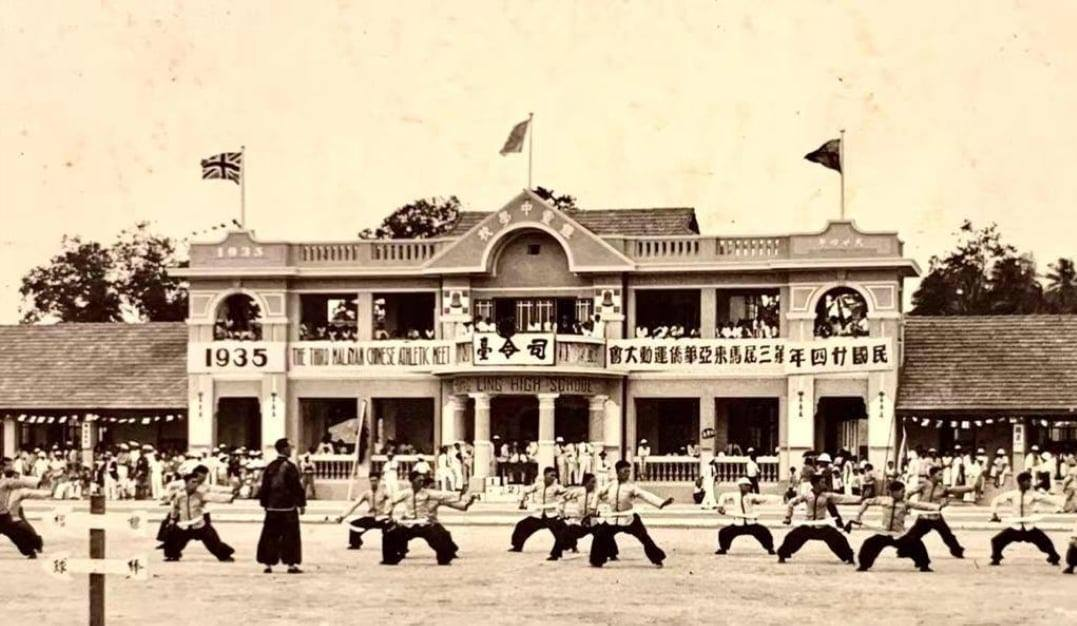
Between 2 and 5 August 1935, track-and-field events of the Third Malayan Chinese Athletic Meet were held at the school.

The school experimented with upper-secondary courses in 1935. This move made Chung Ling the first institution in Malaya to provide complete uninterrupted courses for both primary and secondary education. Construction of the new campus was completed shortly afterwards. The new campus featured a grand central hall. 20 classrooms were given special names: each after the organisations and people that had donated more than a thousand Straits dollars during the donation campaign as a token of appreciation. The campus also featured modern offices for the teachers and staffs, dormitories, washrooms, dedicated courts for badminton and basketball, as well as a 400 metres (1,300 feet) long athletic track, the first in Malaya. The newly built campus was the site for the opening ceremony and later track-and-field events for the Third Malayan Chinese Athletic Meet (第三届馬來亞華僑運動大會), between 2 and 5 August 1935 by the Penang Philomathic Union. The school moved in on 2 October 1935, while classes start on the 7th. The school had an estimated 939 students with 53 teachers by 1936.

=== Echoes of war ===
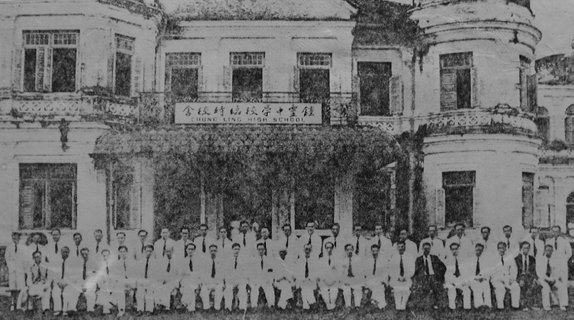
The temporary campus at Northam Road, 1940

In 1937, David Chen expanded the present mottoes of the school and compiled a list of disciplinary principles. This was known as the Ten Principles (十大信条, or The Ten Commandments). In 1938, the first graduation ceremonies for upper-secondary students were held. The events in China during the Second Sino-Japanese War provoked students and teachers to contribute to the war effort. David Chen resigned and returned to Kunming in September 1939 to serve as the general director of the Kunming National Zhong Zheng School of Medicine, and later the first principal of the China Air Force Junior School at Sichuan.

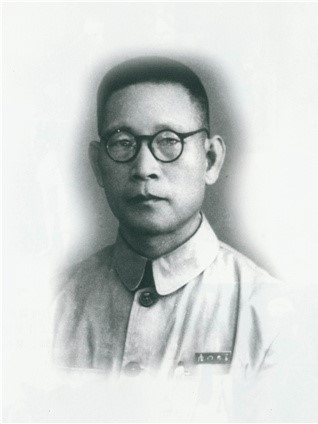
Lim Hooi Seong (Lin Hui Xiang), 1939. He was the provost of Chung Ling High School until March 1941, when he was fired for political reasons.

Anthropologist Lim Hooi Seong, whom previously worked in Singapore as a teacher, was appointed as provost after Chen's departure. In late–1939, he led the school to launch a nationwide campaign across Malaya for the donation of winter clothing for the war in China. For four months, starting from 9 September 1940, the school was forced to hold classes at a temporary campus at 41 Northam Road, before returning to Ayer Itam. Classes were again shifted back to 41 Northam Road in early–1941 under orders by the British government to convert the Ayer Itam campus into a makeshift military hospital. In October 1941, Lim was fired from his position by the Board of Governors. According to Lim's personal memoirs, the dismissal was political – his origins at Xiamen led the pro-Nationalist Board of Governors to assume he was a communist sympathizer. His daughter Lin Huaming later wrote otherwise, stating Lim's refusal to expel 10 students suspected to be communists, led to his forceful removal. Provostship of the school was abolished soon afterwards, and in October 1941 an emergency message was sent to David Chen, whom returned to the school as its first headmaster.

=== Japanese occupation and purges ===
On 8 December 1941, the Japanese invasion of Malaya, the first military conflict of the Pacific War, began at Kelantan. Dogfights above the skies of Penang started on the following day, and the city was bombed by Japanese bombers and aircraft from the 11th. Japanese landings commenced on the 17th, and the island was secured on the 19th. Upon the Japanese arrival, classes of the school were terminated and the school was forced to shut down indefinitely. Equipment from both the campuses at Northam Road and Ayer Itam were raided, looted and destroyed. Staff members of the school, fearing reprisals for their anti-Japanese political involvement, either fled or remained incognito. David Chen, whose name was listed among the blacklists for wanted anti-Japanese intellects, found shelter in the jungles of the Cameron Highlands, posing himself as a vegetable farmer. The Japanese purges of hostile dissidents, notably Chinese intellects, known as Sook Ching, started in February 1942. The purges eventually reached Penang by April 1942. Chung Ling was one of the main targets, after its high-profile local anti-Japanese demonstrations and donation efforts involved by both students and teachers alike. Between 5 and 6 April 1942, the Kempeitai arrested all ten remaining teachers and hundreds of students for interrogation. They were subjected to heavy torture and brutality. Among the eleven teachers, six were killed during imprisonment. The surviving five teachers were released in July 1942. Two of them later succumbed from their injuries. 46 students were also killed, totaling the confirmed tally to 54. There were reports of as much as 200 to 300 dead – however the figure still remains highly disputed. All 8 teachers became martyrs within the school. A memorial was set up in 1950 commemorating their legacy.

The Eight Martyrs
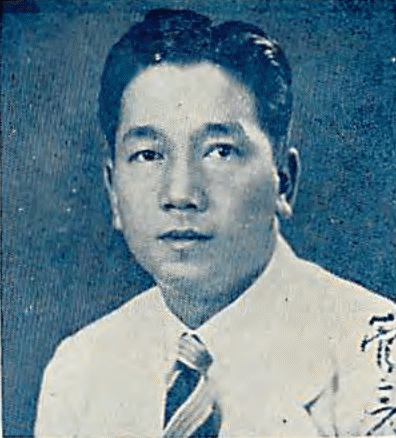
Guan Lianggong

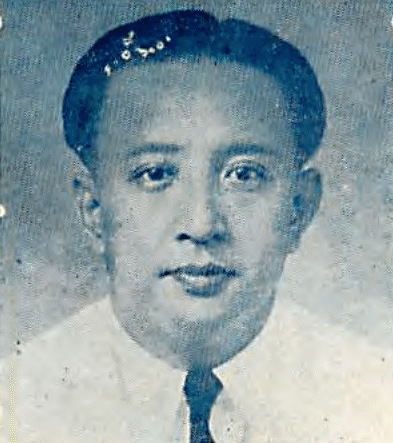
Cha Qitang

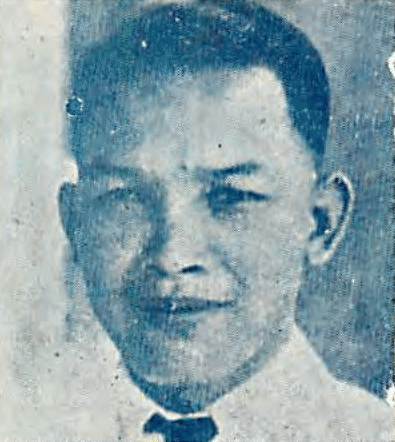
Jian Dehuei

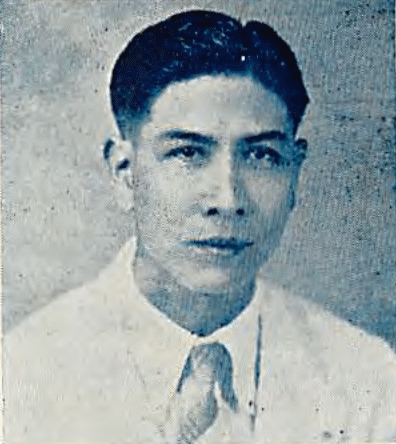
Ke Citong

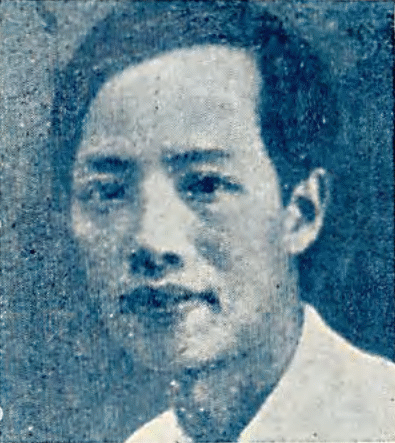
Li Ciyong

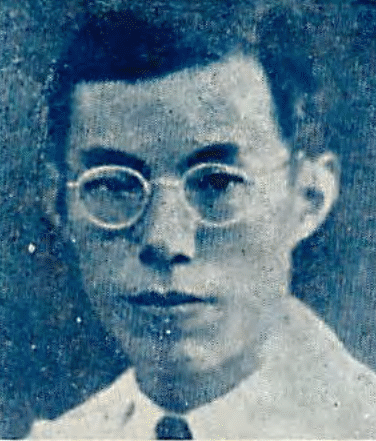
Lin Zhenkai

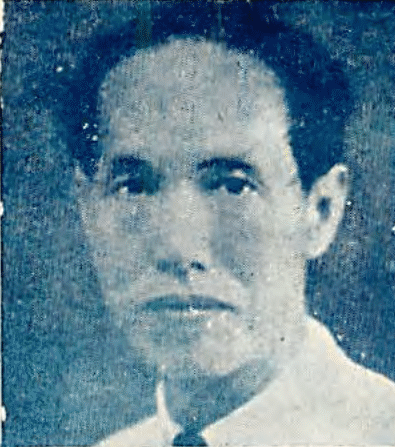
Xiao Baiying

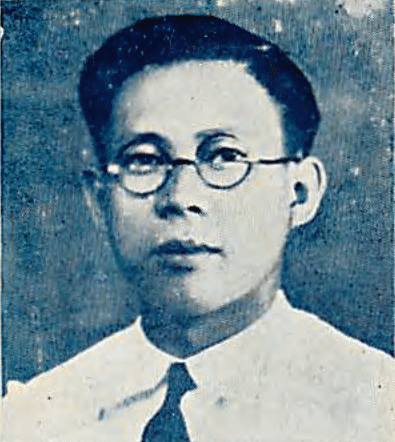
Zhu Xuanyi

=== Post-war recovery (1946–1952) ===
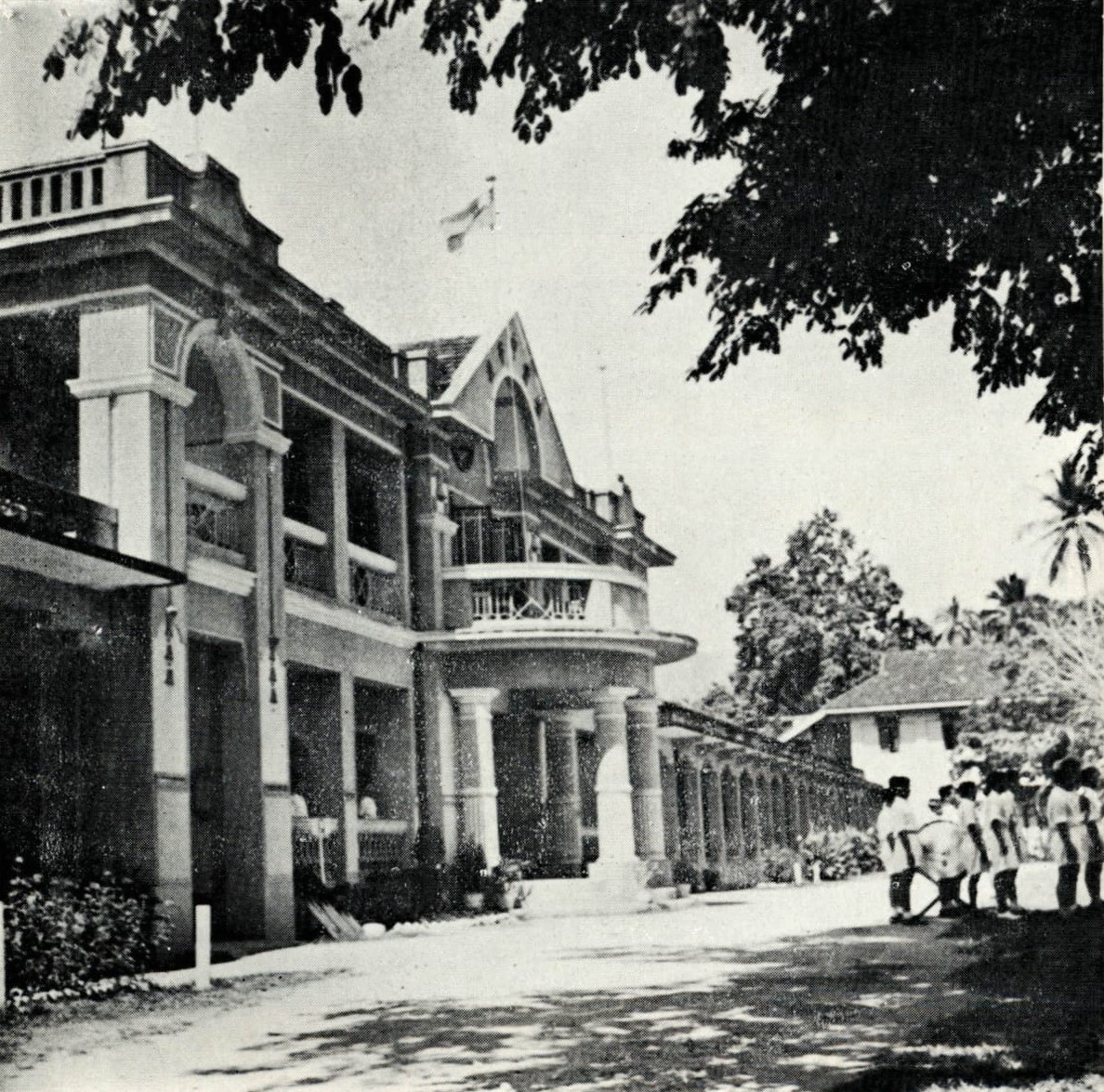
The campus, 1948

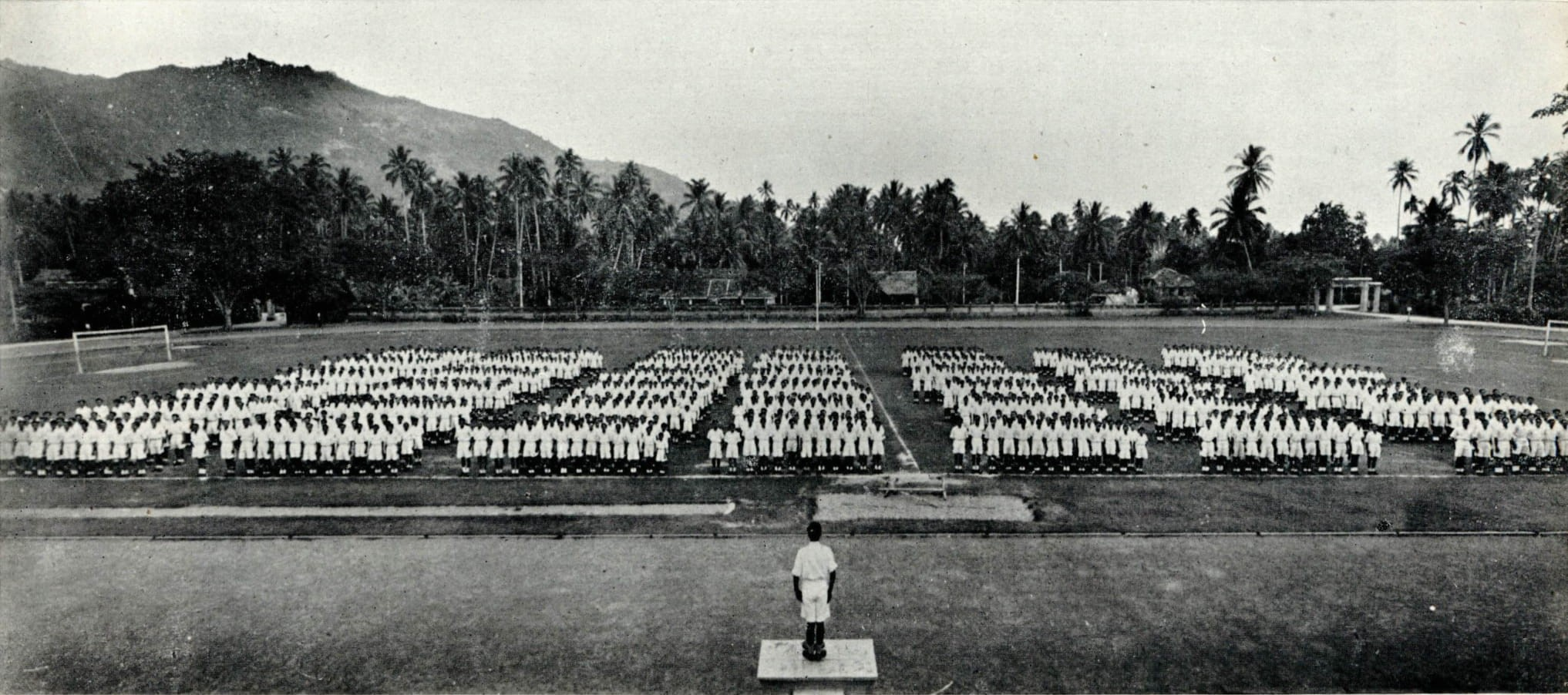
Roll call of all students, 1948

Japan officially accepted the terms for unconditional surrender on 15 August 1945. Allied reoccupation of Malaya began on the following month. Under Operation Jurist, Penang was formally reoccupied by the British on 2 September, the first in Malaya. David Chen returned to Penang on 15 September 1945 and gathered seven former staffs of Chung Ling on 23 September to discuss about reconstructions. On 15 October 1945, former students were open to registration to return to their studies. Preparations were complete by 31 October. A staff meeting was made on 2 November 1945, and a reopening ceremony was conducted on the 11th. Another ceremony was made on 8 December, and on 10 December 1945, classes resumed for the first time since the outbreak of the war in 1941. There were 847 students and 45 staffs upon the reopening of the school, exceeding expectations by the staffs which placed estimations at "only 500 to 600 students". By August 1946, the number had swelled to 1,323 with 320 boarding students, including foreign nationals as far as the Dutch East Indies and Burma, as well as 61 staffs. A census, dated February 1948, lists the school's official student count at 1,334. The record number of students came as a surprise, where it caused a major shortage in equipment, furniture, and classrooms. The need for a larger campus became dire once more, and in 1948 upon charity and donations 16 more classrooms in two separate buildings were constructed.

By 1948, the school had three targets:

1. 擴建校舍，拓展校地，盡量完實教學設備。
2. 重質不重量，切實施行訓教合一。
3. 物質建設告一段落，經濟相當充裕時，從事專業訓練，俾學生升學與謀生得以并行不悖。

— 鍾靈中學校刊復興號三 (本校簡史)
Translation:

1. Expansion of the campus, development of school-owned lands, and to fulfill all teaching equipment as much as possible.
2. Value quality but not quantity, and faithfully execute a unified education system.
3. End of material construction; when the economy recovers, commence professional trainings, promoting the importance of the parallel commencement of education and supporting oneself.

— Chung Ling High School Annual Revival Edition 3 (1948)

The hall was expanded in 1949, where construction proceeded until May 1950. The hall was renamed the Huai-ze Hall (懷澤堂, meaning the Hall of Remembrance of the Li Tek Seah), as a gift of appreciation to the large-sums of donation from the Li Tek Seah, a local organisation. The hall was the largest in any Malayan school at the time, with an estimated capacity of over 2000 people, costing in excess of 250 thousand Malayan dollars. On 1 December 1950, 73 teachers protested against the school's decision to reduce allowances for all teachers.

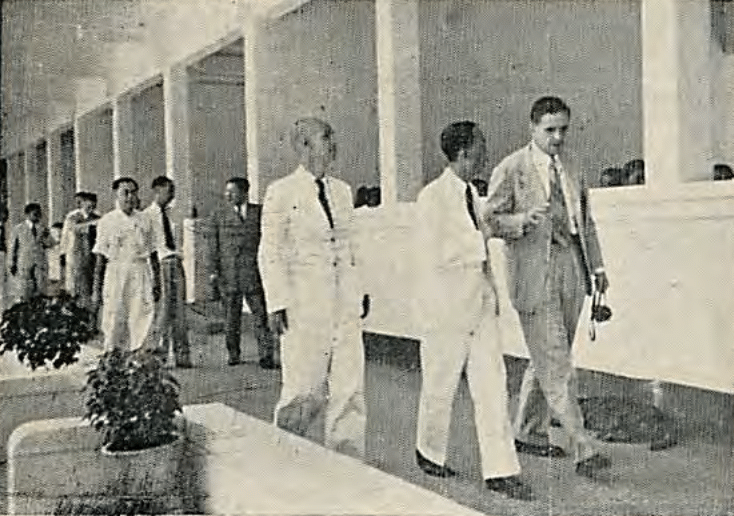
Draftees of the Fenn-Wu Report visit the school, 15 March 1951.

Starting from 3 March 1951, David Chen and Zhong Sen, Honorary Member of the board of directors, as well as their respective wives embarked on a series of official visits to schools of 7 different countries in Europe for an educational study, observing the local education systems. Chan Chong Yuk (referred to as "Chan Tsung Nyok" or "Tan Chong Gark", 1889–1951), the Director of Chinese Studies, was appointed as the acting-principal during Chen's trip. The visit ended on 22 July 1951 when the team returned to Georgetown.

During the early 1950s, education reports and surveys were conducted on Malaya. Chung Ling was subjected to multiple visits from different education authorities due to its significance. The school opposed the Barnes Report, published in 1951. In an interview by Singapore Standard dated 16 September 1951, David Chen argued that the Barnes Committee (the committee behind the drafting of the Barnes Report), controversial for lacking in Chinese and Indian members, was "arbitrary and undemocratic". On the other hand, the school supported the Fenn-Wu Report, which proposed a more flexible education system that tolerated non-Malay vernacular schools. One of the draftees of the Fenn-Wu Report, Dr. Wu Teh Yao, was in fact an alumnus of the school (graduated 1936). Both draftees of the Fenn-Wu Report, Dr. William P. Fenn and Dr. Wu visited Chung Ling High School's campus between 15 and 17 March 1951 for the drafting of the education report. A separate visit was made on 26 May 1951 by E.E.C Thuraisingham, then the Minister of Education within the Communities Liaison Committee (CLC) and L.D. Whitfield, the chairman of the Barnes Committee.

Construction of the Huai-ze Hall (1949–1950)
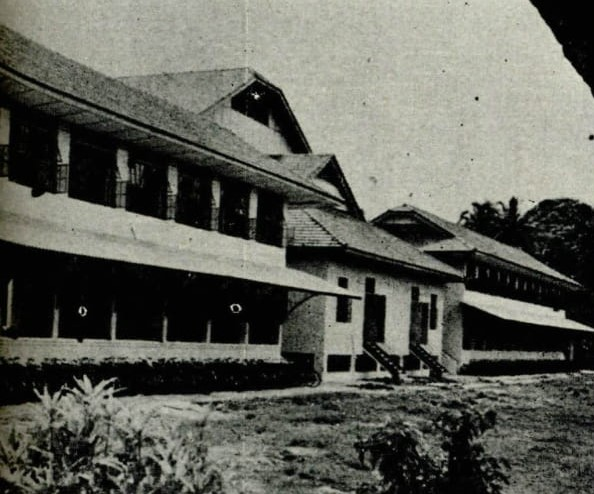
Huai-ze Hall, 1950

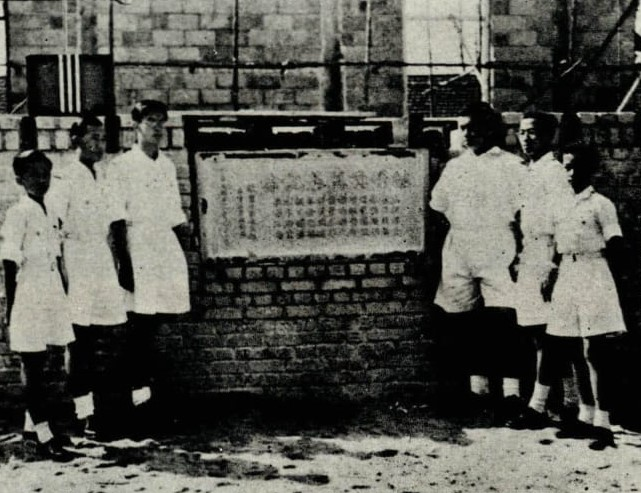
Foundation stone laid

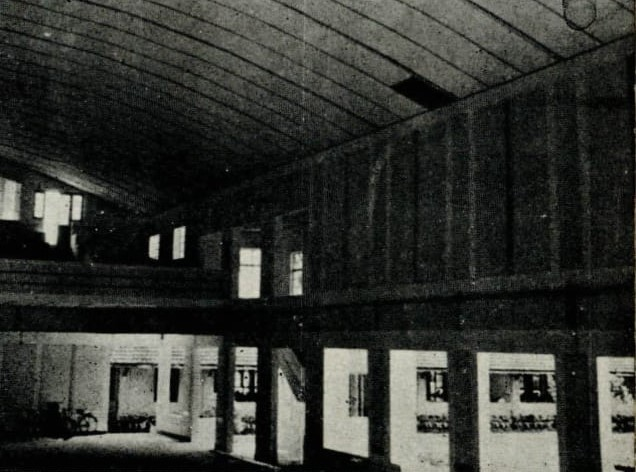
Interior of the Huai-ze Hall

=== Malayan Emergency (1949–1952) ===
The school's origins, notably the heavy political influence exerted by Kuomintang-sympathetic personnel on the school, garnered attention by members of the Malayan Communist Party (CPM) during the Malayan Emergency. Between 1949 and 1951, 2 teachers of the school were shot dead by unknown assailants – widely attributed to the members of the CPM. The assassinations ended with the death of David Chen, purportedly shot dead by CPM members.

==== Assassination of Boey Eng Eng (1949) ====
The first assassination occurred on 20 September 1949, when Boey Eng Eng (1900–1949), a retired teacher of the school, and a prominent leader of the Kuomintang-aligned Malayan Chinese Association (MCA, later Malaysian Chinese Association), was shot in the stomach at his residence by an unknown youth with a revolver. He was killed three hours after he was officially appointed an important position within the Penang branch of the political party. He died while on transit in a police van to the Penang General Hospital.

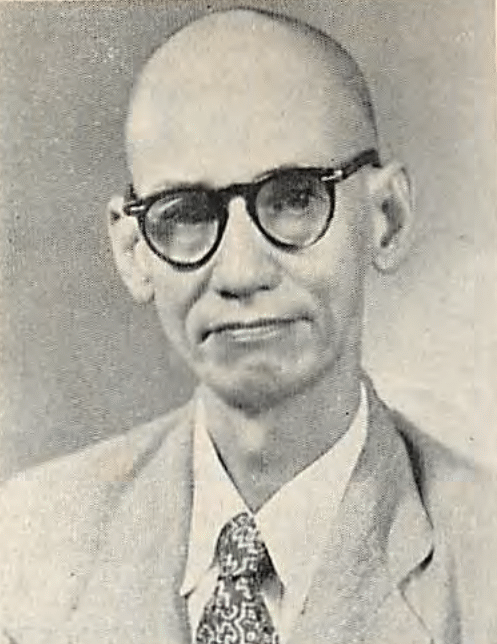
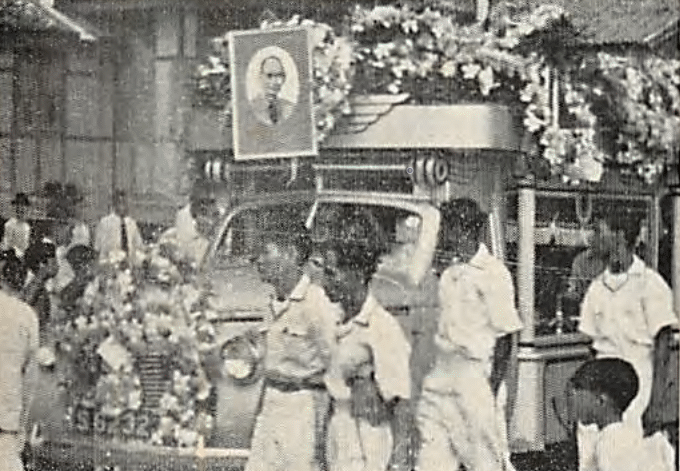
Chan Chong Yuk, prior to his death (left); Chan's funeral, held after his assassination in October 1951 (right)

==== Assassination of Chan Chong Yuk (1951) ====
During the late-night of 21 October 1951, Chan Chong Yuk was shot dead on his trishaw by unknown snipers while returning to his apartment after a teachers' banquet. Prior to his death, his trishaw was followed by a youth riding a bicycle, tailgating him until his death near Kampung Kolam. He was shot in the head and died instantly. A funeral procession was held soon after his death.

==== Communist infiltration within students ====
On 18 March 1950, nearly 17,200 pamphlets, published by the CPM, titled "Truth" were discovered by the police. The pamphlets were distributed to classrooms. A student was sentenced to 18 months in prison on 22 June 1950 after police found documents and newspapers that were affiliated to the CPM in his living quarters. On 27 January 1951, Communist posters, written in Chinese, were found in dormitories and classrooms. Teachers and students were interrogated by the authorities. On 10 February 1951, pamphlets were found in the school which were handed over to the police. On 30 October 1951, over 100 Communist pamphlets were found in several classrooms. Some of them were related towards the recent assassination of Chan Chong Yuk, killed on 21 October 1951, 9 days earlier. The pamphlets portrayed Chan as "a Kuomintang-agent". A man, suspected to be part of the Min Yuen, was arrested at Tanjung Tokong the day after in relation to the discovery.

==== Assassination of David Chen (1952) ====
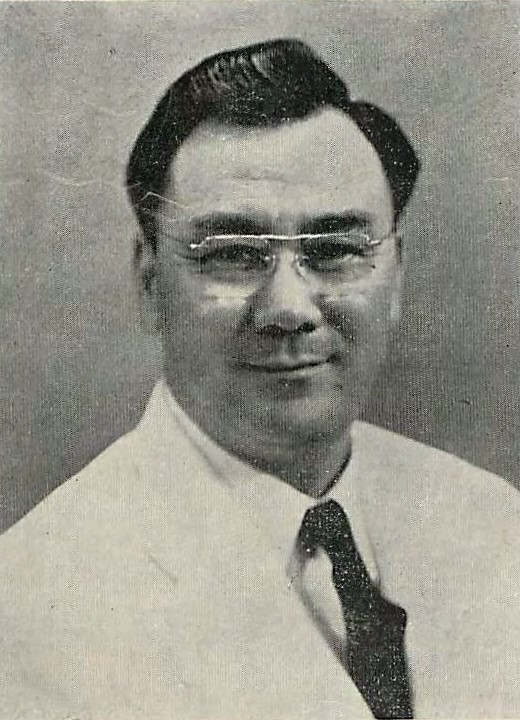
Portrait of David Chen, 1951

On 4 February 1952, David Chen was assassinated while seated at the driver's seat of his car, parked at the junction between Macalister Road and Lorong Selamat. The incident took place opposite of the campus of the Fukien Girls' School (later Penang Chinese Girls' High School, where their campus at Macalister Road was formally moved to Gottlieb Road in 1956). He was on his way to a meeting at the office of the Chinese Teacher's Association of Penang nearby, accompanied by Yong Oui Seng, another teacher of the school. The assassin rode his bicycle towards his stationary car and shot his head with a pistol. He was instantly killed. Commotion erupted around the scene where the lone assassin escaped among the confusion of the crowd. A former pupil nearby, realising his former headmaster had been shot, drove the car, along with Yong and Chen's body to the hospital. He was pronounced dead on arrival.

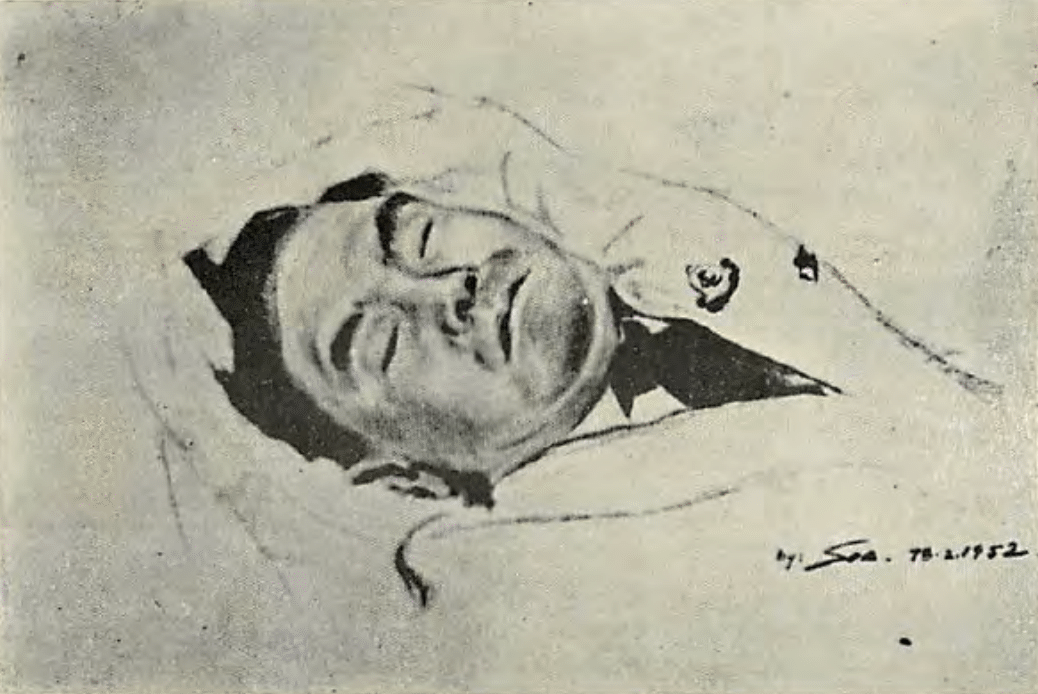
Sketch of David Chen by K.Sia (7 February 1952)

David Chen's death became headline news in Malaya and Singapore throughout the rest of 1952 and 1953. It triggered widespread shock and paranoia among the local Chinese population of both Penang and Malaya. The Penang police responded shortly after by launching one of the largest manhunts in the city's history to locate and arrest the killers. His body was laid in state at the Huai-ze Hall on 7 February 1952. Over 4000 students, both former and present alike, attended his funeral. The school flag was placed on his coffin by Ong Keng Seng, executive director of the school. A charcoal sketch of David Chen's upper torso, drawn by K.Sia, a notable Malayan artist, and art teacher of the school, was displayed at the hall. The funeral procession, over 1.5 miles (2.4 kilometres) long, stretched along a 6 miles (9.7 kilometres) route from Kampung Bharu, where thousands of students and teachers of both Chung Ling High School and Fukien Girls' School marched under the escort of motorcycles. Tens of thousands of residents of Georgetown were said to have witnessed the procession, one of the largest in the city's history. The convoy stopped briefly at the junction of Macalister Road and Lorong Selamat, where David Chen was killed. It ended at the Western Road Cemetery, where he was laid to rest under a Christian burial ceremony conducted by Reverend T.H.Huang.

Accusations of the main culprit for the assassination landed on the CPM, whom previously were displeased with his anti-communist stance in education. There were rumours, circulated around the time of his death, that Communist-sympathetic students, working for the CPM, submitted intelligence reports that characterised David Chen as an anti-Communist hardliner, which provoked the upper echelons of the CPM to eliminate his presence. Another theory forwarded regards the possible involvement by the British colonial government, for Chen's supposed extremist views on Chinese education. Two Chinese youths, Lee Khuan Koa and Chan Kwong Siew, were charged for his murder. The trials began on 24 March 1953. Both youths pleaded guilty.

完全不必要的，而且对我们的事业起了反作用。(...totally unnecessary, and it even backfired our operations.)

— Chin Peng on David Chen's death, My Side of History, 2003

While awaiting trial, both suspects escaped from prison. Chan was shot and killed by the police on 27 March 1953 while evading capture. A third suspect, Lam Yew Cheong, was later known to have involved in the assassination, but he shot himself during a police standoff in a Chinese school near Seh Tan Court (at the Eng Chuan Tong Tan Kongsi) after a failed heist on 7 April 1952. Investigations confirmed that all three members involved in the shooting were part of a branch of the CPM, known as the Lau Tong Hui. The branch was involved in ten murder cases (six murders, four attempted murders) and three firearms heists. The branch was internally dissolved in an unknown time after April 1952 when branch members were either executed by the CPM, fled to China, or were captured by authorities. On 25 June 1953, Lee, the last surviving member of the group, was found guilty and sentenced to death.

In 2003, Chin Peng, Secretary-General of the CPM, admitted full responsibility for personally approving the killings of Chen. He also stated that he subsequently regretted his approval after David Chen's death.

Funeral of David Chen (4–8 February 1952)
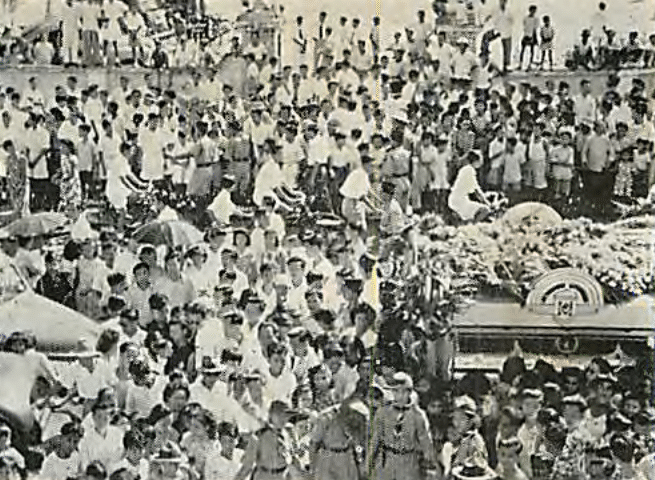
Massive crowds gather at the school and the school hall to pay their last respects.

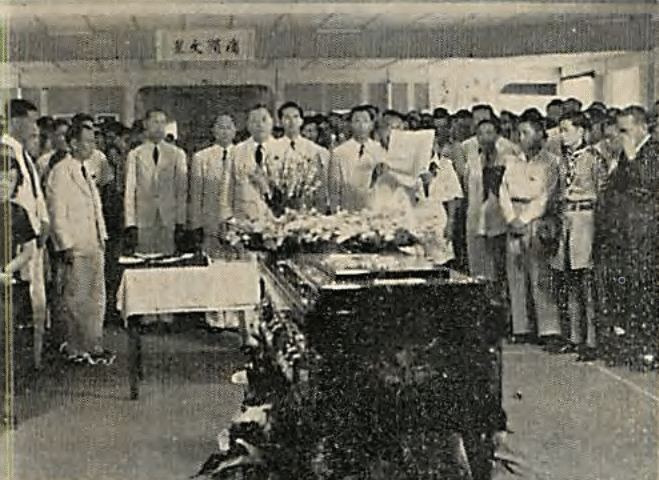
Members of staff, students and members of the public pay their respects.

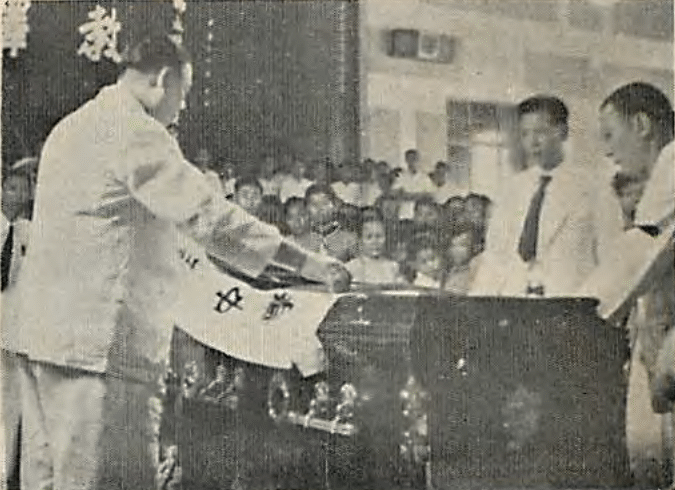
Ong Keng Seng, Executive Director of the school, lays the school flag on David Chen's casket.

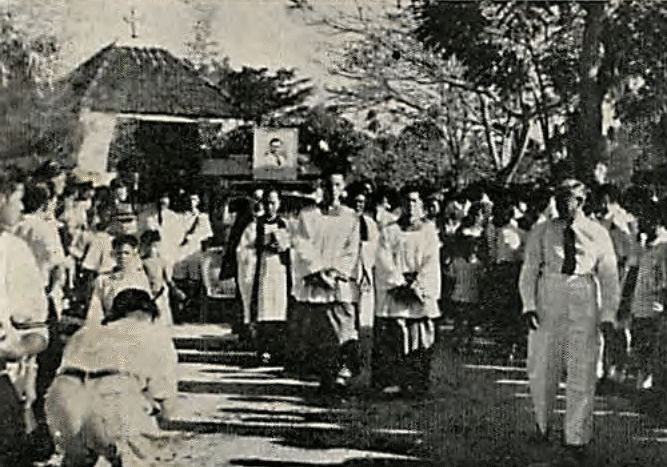
Rev. T.H.Huang leads the funeral procession at the Western Road Cemetery.

==== Assassination of Cheah Cheng Teik (1953) ====
On 6 February 1953, Cheah Cheng Teik, a 19-year-old student of the school, and a member of a local Communist organisation, was shot and killed by an unknown man. Two shots were fired when he left his house for school. One bullet shot through his head, while the other struck a car nearby. He was sent to hospital by ambulance, but died three hours after. His death, according to the authorities, was attributed to his conflict with other members in an underground Communist organisation.

=== Early Wang Yoong Nien-era (1952–1955) ===
Soon after David Chen's death, Wang Yoong Nien, the school Dean, assumed his position as headmaster pro tempore. He was formally appointed as the temporary headmaster on 1 June 1952. A grand ceremony took place on 4 February 1953, commemorating the late-David Chen. Construction of the school hostel complex was complete and inaugurated on 30 May 1953. The hostel has a capacity of 250 boarding students with a dining hall capable of hosting 800 people. The dining hall was renamed Huai-en Hall (Huai-en Ting, Chinese: 怀恩厅; "恩" in reference to David Chen's middle name) in memoriam of the late David Chen.

In 1954, the central portion of the campus complex was extended, forming a clock tower six stories tall. Construction lasted until 1955. 16 semi-detached houses were built behind the campus as residences for teachers, staffs, and their families. Primary school classes, which had been in operation since 1917, were permanently terminated in 1955.

=== Nationalisation (1955–1957) ===
At the turn of the mid-1950s, Malaya was entering a period of self-governance and eventual independence from the United Kingdom. In 1952, the British colonial government in Malaya issued the Education Ordinance of 1952, with the aim of creating a national education curriculum which could be implemented in all institutions of the country. However, the Chinese community protested against the 1952 Ordinance, as it effectively diminished the importance of the Chinese language within the proposed nationalized education system. In the end, the 1952 Ordinance was cancelled, not because of the Chinese uproar, but the lack of funding from budget deficits in the Malayan government of the time. The United Chinese School Committees Association of Malaysia (UCSCAM), or better known as Dong Jiao Zong (or Dong Zong), was founded as a response towards the highly controversial 1952 Ordinance. The Council Paper No. 64 of 1954, published in September 1954, suggested the formation of English classes as an intermediary measure to anglicise Chinese vernacular schools. It was again heavily opposed by the Dong Zong and the Chinese community. In 1955, the Razak Report was drafted by then Education Minister, Tun Abdul Razak. It was again met with dissatisfaction towards the policy of using Malay as the only medium within secondary education. The Dong Zong became a proponent of Chinese education in Malaya, and heavily influenced Chinese schools of the 1950s.

Starting from 1955, Chinese and Indian vernacular schools were approached by the federal government, led by Chief Minister (later Prime Minister) Tunku Abdul Rahman to receive federal funding at the expense of accepting the integration of the school into the national education system. This move was controversial, as it was accused, by the non-Malay community, as a move to assimilate the local population – known by some as Malayanisation. At the behest of the Malayan government, some schools, such as Chung Ling High School and the Penang Chinese Girls' High School, eventually caved in, accepting federal funding, becoming a National Type School. This was the case of most of the Chinese institutions in Malaya. However, other schools, such as the Han Chiang High School abstained the offer, defending their previous statuses, becoming what was later known to be the 60 Chinese independent high schools of Malaya and later, Malaysia under the supervision of the Dong Zong (the Dong Zong insisted on the '60+2+1' formula, which would be the correct and official interpretation). The move by Chung Ling High School, under the decision of the administrators led by Wang Yoong Nien, sparked heavy disagreements by students and teachers alike, and provoked demonstrations which ended up in police detentions and violent clashes throughout 1956 and 1957. It also caused a split in Chung Ling, sowing the seeds for the formation of Chung Ling (Private) High School.

==== First student strikes (5–20 July 1955) ====
As early as June 1955, there were rumours that Chung Ling High School was prepared to accept federal funding. The rumours were later proven to be true, when on 3 July 1955, the board of directors formally accepted the federal government's offer to receive financial backing. The decision was made public on 6 July by Wang Yoong Nien, the headmaster. According to Wang, the school was facing financial difficulties for a long time, having a budget deficit of almost 60 thousand Malayan dollars every year. The announcement shook the students, as no other Chinese school had accepted the government's offer, and the news was quickly spread to other Chinese high schools across Penang and Malaya. Wang promised the students that the present curriculum would not be affected. However, the promise was not taken seriously by the students. Ng Kok Leong, the Head Monitor, called for a meeting discussing the issue, which was reluctantly approved by Wang. The meeting was held the following day, where the Board of Monitors agreed to conduct an opinion poll among the students regarding the school's decision.

By 9 July, Ong Keng Seng admitted that the school had been in contacts with the government to receive financial aid since 1953. On 14 July 1955, inspired by the incidents in Chung Ling, 800 students of the Han Chiang High School, dissatisfied with their headmaster's lack of response towards a donation program to fund the construction and formation of the Nanyang University at Singapore, launched a boycott on their classes. The boycott was called off after Lim Lean Teng, the chairman of the Board of Directors of the high school, mediated the incident. On 18 July 1955, students of Chung Ling gathered at the hall for a demonstration, requesting the school, as well as Wang himself, to revert the Board of Director's decision to accept federal funding, for the preservation of Chinese culture, vernacular education and the prevention of the Malayanisation of the independent Chinese education system operated by the school. Both Wang and Ye Chih Yen (Dean of disciplinary affairs), attempted to dismantle the tension among the students and mediate the situation.

On 20 July 1955, a committee of 13 students drafted a memorandum, citing the rejection of federal funding, from the reasons of failing to pursue an equal status of federal aid along with other English schools. The memorandum, showing sympathy to the school's failing financial status, also proposed to raise tuition fees to counter the appeal from the government as an alternative method to solve the financial issue. An independent referendum was held, overwhelmingly approving the memorandum. In response, the committee submitted the memorandum to the federal government, rejecting all forms of federal funding unless the circumstances are unconditional.

==== Chung Ling Seven incident (12 August 1955) ====
On the early hours of 12 August 1955, twelve students from three schools (three from Han Chiang High School, two from Chung Hwa High School and seven from Chung Ling High School) were arrested and detained by the police under the Emergency Regulation for the reasons of 'removing Communist infiltration from Chinese schools'. All 12 students were accused by the authorities as being Communists, although the allegations were denied by both the parents and the students themselves. The seven detained students from Chung Ling High School were given the moniker "Chung Ling Seven" (Chinese: 鍾靈七君子). The incident sparked a silent protest participated by the students of the morning classes. The students, numbered at 1,400 from 35 classes, refused to participate in examinations that were meant to be scheduled for the day. Fearful of similar protests in other states, the Malayan federal government issued an order on 14 August to all Chinese students of Malaya, demanding them to not get involved in the demonstrations or face repercussions, including "damaging the interests of vernacular education by the Alliance government". As of the time of the announcement, students from Singapore and Penang were already in protests. On 17 August 1955, an appeal was sent to Tunku by the students of the school, requesting the immediate release of all detainees. Appeals to Tunku were also sent by the Alliance Party of Penang. On 20 August 1955, all 12 detainees were released. 5 of them were exiled from Penang as their parents reside outside from the island.

==== Xuebao incident (November 1956) ====
In May 1956, the Razak Report was formally published. Within the articles of the report, Chinese schools were to be incorporated into the national curriculum as "National-type schools", where the curriculum will be conducted in English instead of Chinese. The government aimed at using federal aid as a measure to lure the interests of the Chinese schools to integrate themselves into the newly implemented policies by the Razak Report. The school was officially designated as a National-type school on 30 June 1956. In August 1956, the federal government introduced a nationwide program that required parents to register their children for education. The move was responded by a fierce campaign by the Dong Zong, under the leadership of Lim Lean Teng, to promote Chinese and Indian parents to register their children in vernacular schools.

On 2 November 1956, the 41st issue of Xuebao, a student-edited publication, was found to contain elements that satirized the school's policy on nationalization. No consultations were made by the editors with Yeh Chih Yen, the advisor for the publication. The president, Yang Songbiao, was sacked from his position and expelled from the school, whereas the head editor, Chen Yuansong, was given two demerits by the school. On 8 November, Prefect Ye Longxin begged the headmaster to not expel Yang. Ye was immediately expelled and detained by the police. On 23 November 1956, students began a demonstration at the Huai-ze Hall, protesting against Ye and Yang's expulsion. On the evening, riot police entered the hall and clashed with the demonstrators. Fights ensued, but the hall was cleared moments after. The school was ordered to close for 3 weeks under the orders of the federal government. 402 board students were expelled from their hostels, becoming homeless overnight. The federal government bypassed the school's authority, resulting in the forceful expulsion of 88 students and the sacking of two teachers.

This act permanently damaged relations between the administrators of the school and the Chinese education community. Wang was accused as a traitor and was given the nickname "Buffalo Wang" (Wang Shui Niu, Chinese: 王水牛) for his involvement in the forceful expulsion of his students.

=== Post independence ===
==== Expansion of facilities ====
The modern laboratories, auditorium, music room and canteen which in aggregate cost over 300,000 ringgit, were opened on 11 March 1962, by the Education Minister. A modern living skills workshop complex, completed at a cost of 200,000 ringgit, was opened by Mr Loh Boon Siew on 22 June 1968. The Sixth Form Block was completed on 14 August 1971, and was opened by Mr Cheah Phee Cheok. An indoor multi-purpose volleyball, badminton and basketball court was added to Huai Ze Hall in April 1977.

A room dedicated to the learning of technology, a collaboration between the school and Intel Malaysia, was opened on 19 August 1987. Such a facility and the collaboration in setting it up was the first in the country. Under the sponsorship of Kwong Wah Yit Poh, the school upgraded its electronic administration system into a local-area network in 1991 to increase the administrative efficiency of the school. The library received an upgrade in July 1993 and was air-conditioned. In addition, an alumni database and electronic network was set up to facilitate communications between alumni worldwide. The school set up its website in March 1996, and the library acquired Internet connections. In February 1997, the offices of teachers and staff, the staff lounge and the exercise room were renovated and air-conditioned.

The school launched a major expansion from 1997. The single-storey classrooms near David Chen Garden were demolished in June 1996. Replacing it were a four-storey building containing 24 classrooms, completed in October 1998. Similar arrangements were employed for the old classrooms on the other side of the school, of which the demolition works started in December 1998 and the new building was completed on late 1999.

==== Formation of the Private and Butterworth sisters ====
In 1961, Chung Ling (Private) High School was formed to take in those students who wished to receive their education totally in their mother tongue.

In 1986, Chung Ling High School Butterworth Branch was opened. It was later renamed Chung Ling Butterworth High School to reflect its independent identity. Together with the Private School, the three Chung Lings became known as Tri-Chung Ling High Schools which share a Board of Governors but are essentially three independent schools.

==== Changes in curriculum ====
The Education Minister, his deputy and alumnus Michael Chen inspected the school on 8 April 1966, when the Minister announced that the school would commence pre-university course the next year. The course commenced 16 January 1967, enrolling 36 students, of which five were female. It was the first time that the school had enrolled female students.

The school included extracurricular activities as one of the weighted subjects on 1 January 1989.

==== Development ====
The school celebrated its 50th anniversary on 25 August 1967, and held the third Annual Alumni Revisiting Day on the occasion. A diamond-jubilee celebration of the establishment of the school was held from 19–20 June 1992. The event concurred with the 10th Annual Alumni Revisiting Day. The school held two major events three years later. The first was the first Tri-Chung Ling High Schools Joint Sports Carnival, held on 15 August. On the same day, a memorial service was held in memoriam of the teachers and students died during the Second World War.

Wang Yoong Nien retired as principal in December 1970. His position was occupied by Yeap Eng Hoe, who taught pre-university mathematics. Yeap Eng Hoe retired as principal on 14 September 1998. He had served Chung Ling for 29 years, and had been a principal for 27 years. He was succeeded by Teh Kwan Like.

=== The new millennium ===
Apart from the two new buildings mentioned above, two new basketball fields, adjacent to each other, was built in 1999. A new clock tower, sponsored by Datuk Lim Siak Yu, was added in 2000. Other works include the completion of an amphitheatre, a guard house, covered walkways, landscaping projects, upgrade of old classrooms and air-conditioning systems of the library. The clock tower complex was renovated, with the teachers’ offices modified into administrative offices, the gerko center renovated into guests’ rooms, re-partition of office on the first floor and addition of a meeting room. A dental treatment room was added in 2001.

A memorial service was held for Principal David Chen on 4 February 2002, fifty years after his assassination, to show appreciation of his efforts to improve Chinese education and the school. Among those attending were board of directors of the Tri-Chung Ling High Schools, representatives of the Parent-Teachers Association, alumni worldwide, the Chen family, teachers and students of the Tri-Chung Lings and volunteers of Chinese education. The group was led by Datuk Oo Jooi Tee, the Chairman of the Memorial Service Committee, to pay respects to Principal Chen at his resting place at Jalan Sultan Ahmad Shah (Northam Road), Penang.

=== 2010 Penang dragon boat tragedy ===
On 17 January 2010, the school's dragon boat team capsized during practice, having collided with a tugboat amid strong currents. The tragedy claimed six lives in total. Among the dead were coach and school teacher Chin Aik Siang and students Jason Ch'ng, Brendon Yeoh, Goh Yi Zhang, Wang Yong Xiang and Chiah Zi Jun.

== The school ==
With over 90% of its students studying in the Science Stream, Chung Ling High School conforms to the government policy of 60–40. The 60–40 Policy encourages students to focus on the study of science (Science Stream/Curriculum) as compared to the study of art or commerce (Art/Business Streams/Curricula) to the ratio of 60:40.

The school enrols approximately 2,200 students as of 2019. The students are being served by over 160 academic and non-academic staff.

== School identities ==
The school shares its name, logo, flag, anthem, and the Ten Commandments with Chung Ling Butterworth High School and Chung Ling Private High School.

== The campus ==
The school has 86 classrooms, 14 Science Laboratories (of which four are dedicated to Biology, five to Physics and five to Chemistry), five Workshops for Living Skills, one Field, three Basketball Courts, four Indoor Badminton Courts and five Computer Laboratories.

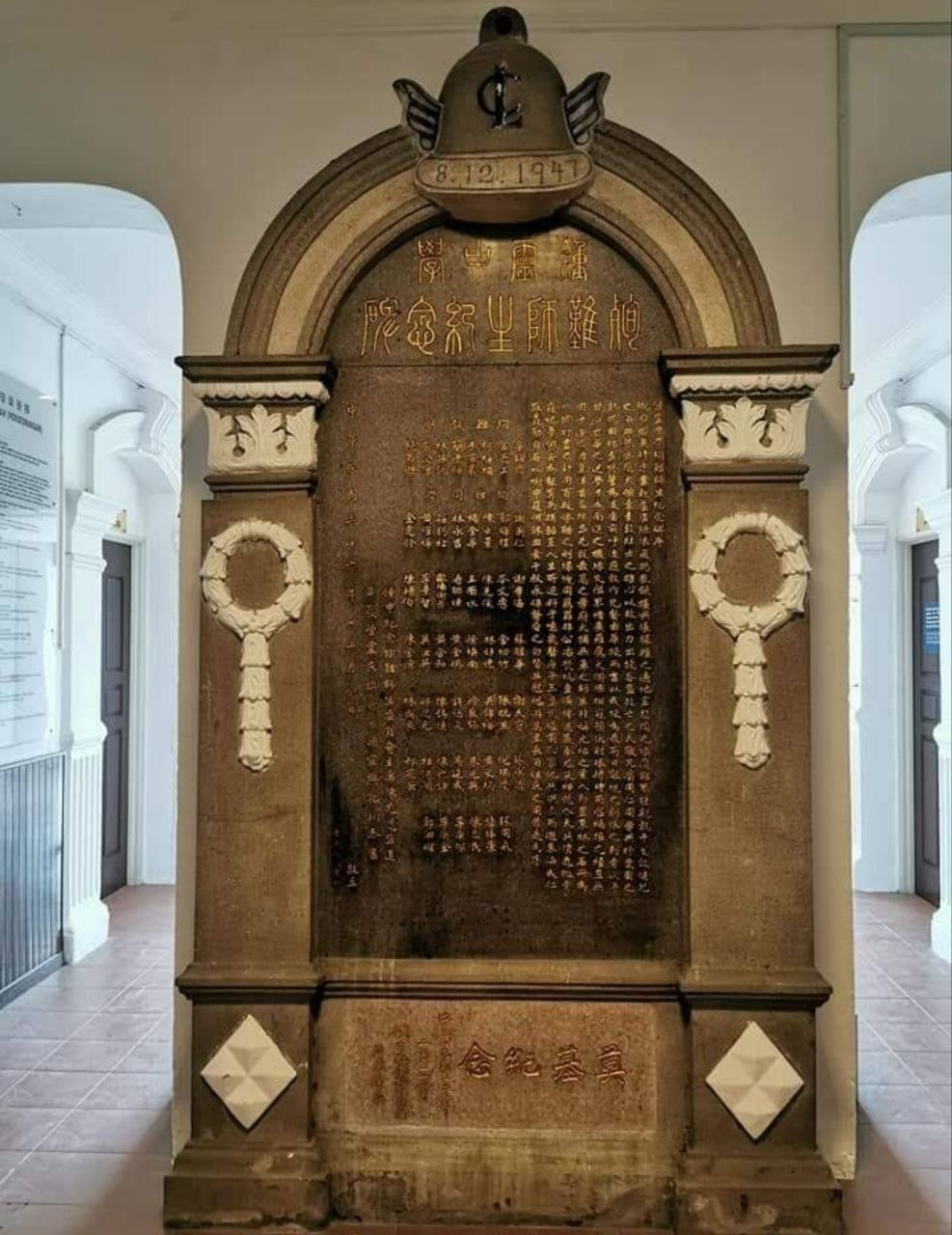
Memorial Monument in front Huai Ze Hall

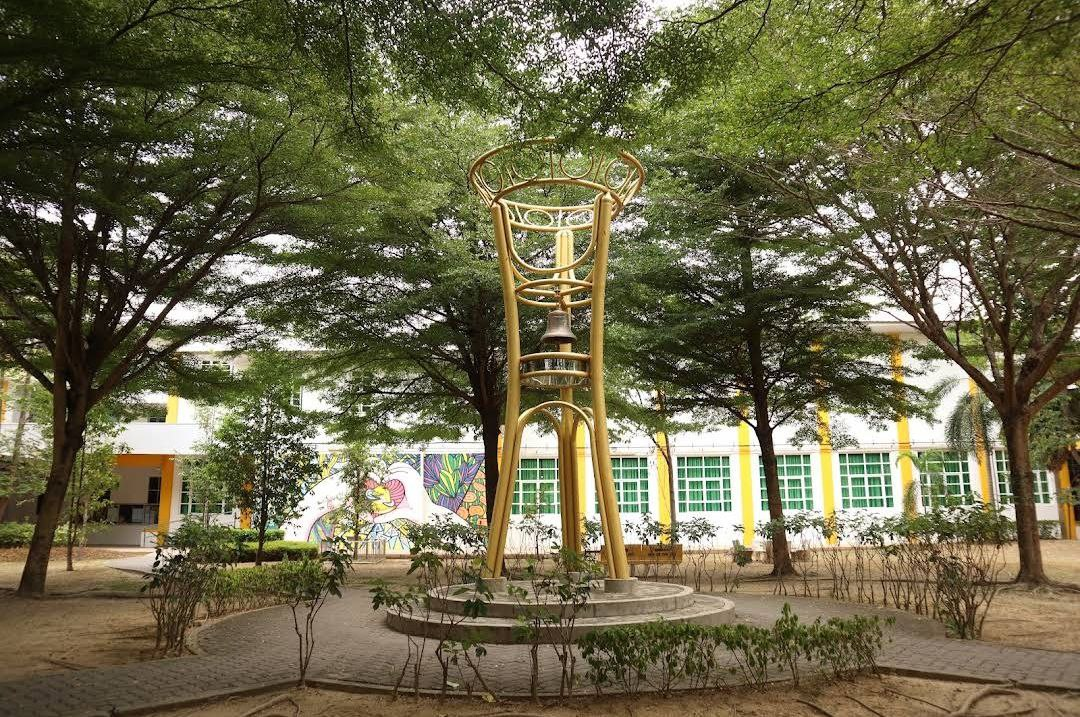
Clock Tower

Huai Ze Hall (怀泽堂) was named in memory of Chung Ling students and teachers who died for the school in the Second World War. To the front of the hall lies the clock tower which also houses the staff and administration of the school. The hall was designed in the early 1940s to have 14 entrances, which were spaced out evenly across the side of the hall. Many of these 14 were never used, and in the subsequent renovation in the Year 2004, six were sealed off, and there only remain eight. Glass windows were fixed, along with curtains to replace the grills and bamboo blinds.

There have been two sets of Blocks A and B. The first pair were single-storey buildings flanking the clock tower, and at the end of each, there were two two-storey science labs. In the 1960s, they were demolished, and new buildings were built in their place. The latter set of Blocks A and B were these, two three-storey buildings, each with 5 classes to a level. The old science labs were renovated to fit into both blocks. Today, Blocks A and B consist of 25 classrooms, two discipline rooms, a knowledge centre, the gerko room and the Vice Principals' Room.

Blocks D and Es flank both sides of the hall and are two-storey buildings with four classrooms per level. The classrooms found here are the oldest ones in the school still in use.

Blocks C and F are the newest buildings of the school, with Block F being finished in 1998 and Block C in 1999. They are the highest buildings in the school at four storeys and six classrooms to a level. The predecessors to these new buildings were two-storey ones. The topmost level of Block C holds the Computer Labs 1 to 3, with 4 and 5 being kept at the former science labs at Block A. Block G is the oldest building in the school, and its ageing condition is evident. This block's classrooms were used until 2004, where the last occupants were two Lower Six classes. Its classrooms have been converted into bookshop, gymnasium, counselling section, school cooperative, prefects' room, prayer room, dental clinic and bookloans room. A pathway which splits Block G into two leads down to the air-conditioned music room, Amateur Wireless Society room and numerous sports stores. Block G was demolished on year 2020 and replaced by multipurpose building.

The Sixth Form Block houses most of the sixth form students and eight of the school's 14 labs. The Sixth Form Block holds a library for the students and has seven lecture halls which have been partitioned to form nine classrooms.

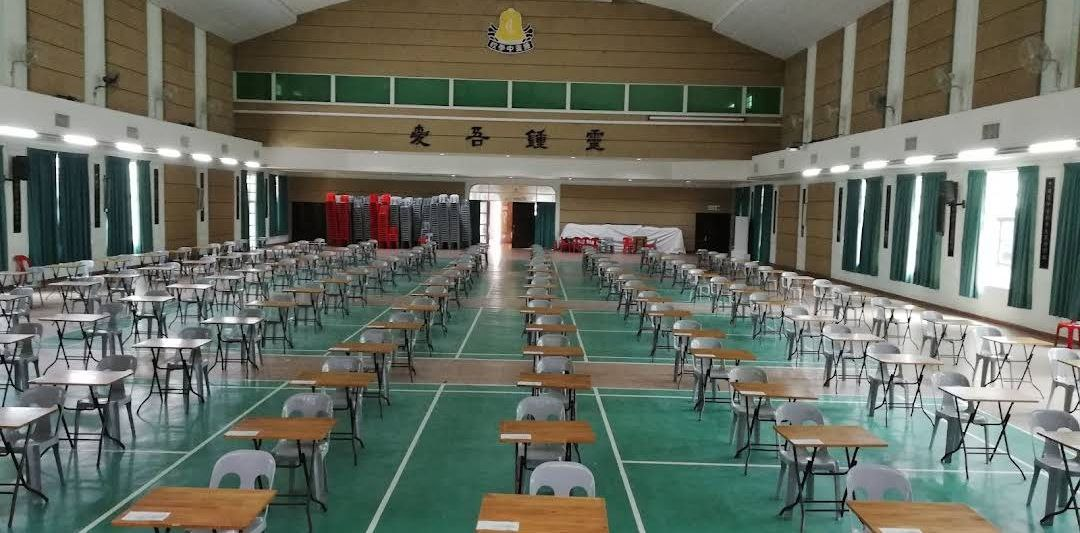
Huai Ze Hall

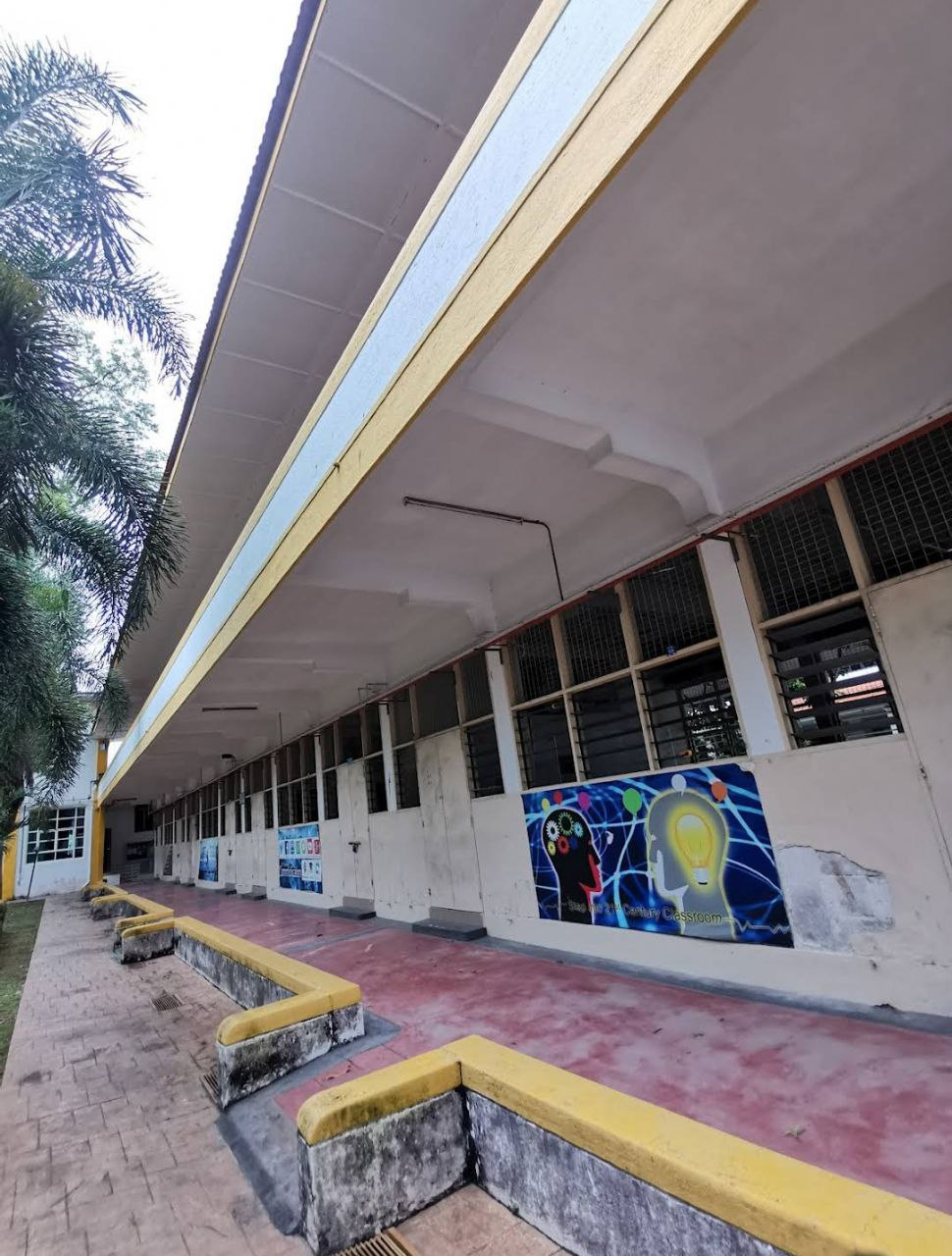
Block D

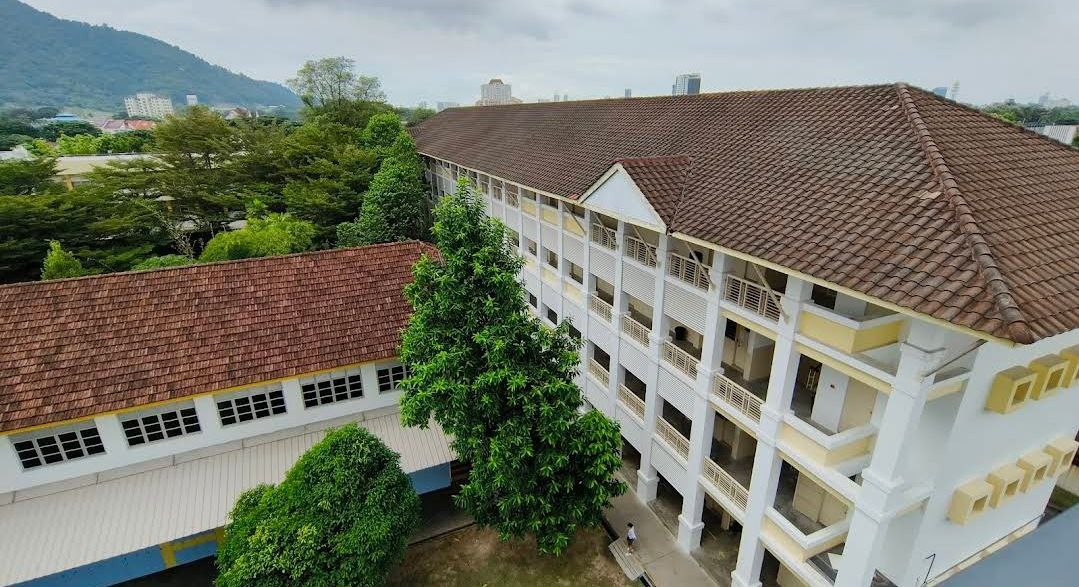
Block F

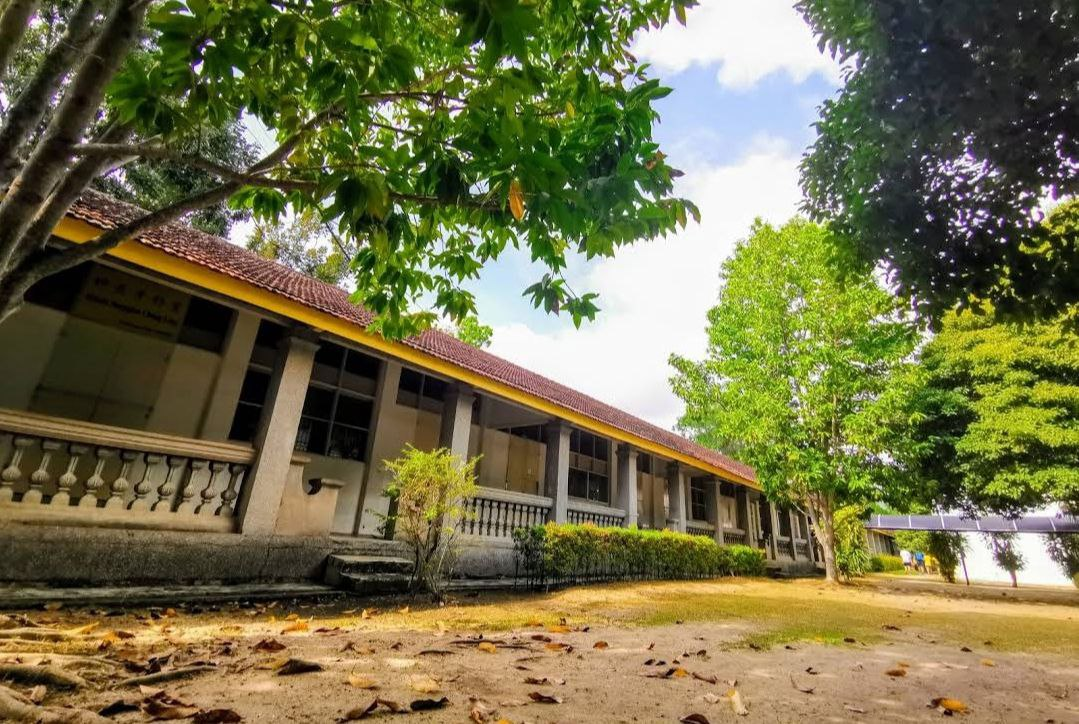
Block G

== Extracurricular activities ==
=== Chung Ling High School Choir ===
In 1969, a group of Chung Ling High School students came up with the idea of forming a choir with the support of the alumni.

== Present and former staffs ==
=== Executive Directors ===
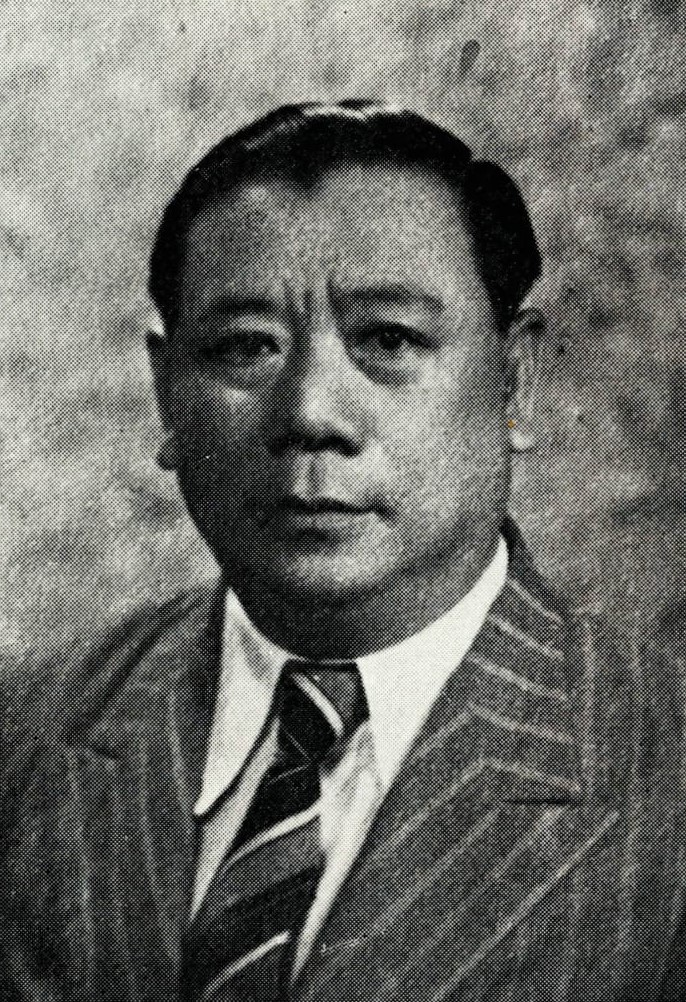
Portrait of Ong Keng Seng, 1948

- Khoo Beng Cheang – 1917 to 1919
- Xie Sheng Zhen – 1919 to 1920
- Khaw Seng Lee – 1921 to 1923
- Lim Lean Teng – 1924 to 1925
- Chen Min Qing – 1926 to 1928
- Khoo Beng Cheang – 1929 to 1930
- Lin Shun Tian – 1931 to 1932
- Khaw Seng Lee – 1933 to 1935
- Lim Lean Teng – 1936 to 1937
- Liu Yu Shui – 1938 to 1941

Interregnum (Japanese occupation of Malaya, December 1941 to September 1945)

- Ong Keng Seng – 1947 to 1962
- Xu Jin Liang – 1963 to 1964
- Loh Poh Heng – 1965 to 1967
- Cheah Phee Cheok – 1968 to 1980
- Tan Sri Loh Boon Siew – 1981 to 1994
- Datuk Ong Hoo Kim – 1995 to 2000
- Dato' Oo Jooi Tee – 2001 to 2010
- Dato' Seri Tan Boon Pin – 2011 to 2013
- Dato' Seri Koay Hean Eng – 2014 onwards

=== Headmasters ===
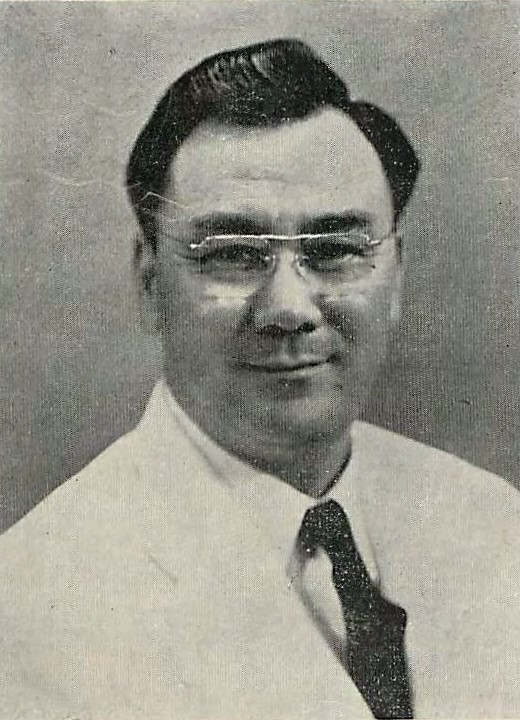
Portrait of David Chen, 1951

The school practices an unofficial tradition where its headmasters can only be a former alumnus. This has been the case for 9 successive headmasters, the first being Yeap Eng Hoe in 1971. The present headmaster is Na Lean Hong, since September 2021.

- Goh Ah Nong (吴亚农, 1891–1943) – 9 February 1917 to January 1921
- Ong Choon Chong (王存统, d. unknown) – January 1921 to December 1921
- Ong Kee Au (王寄欧, d. unknown) – January 1922 to December 1922
- Ko in Beng (顾因明, b. 1881) – 20 January 1923 to May 1927
- Tang Tong How (唐桐侯, d. unknown) – May 1927 to February 1929
- Ooi Cheow Cheng (黃照青, 1887–1962) – August 1930 to June 1931
- David Chen (陈充恩, 1900–1952) – July 1931 to September 1939
- Lim Hooi Seong (林惠祥, 1901–1958) – October 1939 to March 1941
- David Chen (陈充恩, 1900–1952) – October 1941 to December 1941

Interregnum (Japanese occupation of Malaya, December 1941 to September 1945)

- David Chen (陈充恩, 1900–1952) – 11 November 1946 to 4 February 1952
- Wang Yoong Nien (汪永年, 1902–2001) – June 1952 to 31 December 1970
- Yeap Eng Hoe (叶荣和, 1943–2005) – January 1971 (interim)/ 1 April 1972 to 14 September 1998
- Teh Kwan Liek (郑权力, 1998–2004) – 1 October 1998 to 5 June 2004
- Sim Jin Tang (沈仁东, 2004–2006) – 1 August 2004 to 9 May 2006
- Tham Kong Chee (谭匡智, 2006–2007) – 16 May 2006 to 6 December 2007
- Chuah Yau Chou (蔡耀祖, 2007–2012) – 6 December 2007 to 2012
- Ooi Poh Beng (黄保明, 2012–2014) – 2012 to 2014
- Teh Min Hwa (郑明华, 2015–2017) – 2015 to 2017
- Soo Seng Poh (朱圣保, 2017–2021) – 2017 to September 2021
- Na Lean Hong (蓝年丰, 2021–2025) – September 2021 to April 2025
- Khor Chin Soon (许谨顺, 2025-Now) - 2025 to present

== Notable alumni ==
=== Academics ===
- Wu Teh Yao (1915–1994), political scientist; university president of Tunghai University, 1957–1971;
- Wang Kang Ding (1937–2011), sinologist; professor of the Department of Chinese Studies in the National University of Singapore, 1980–1998;
- Goh Boon Poh, educator, recipient of the 8th Shen Muyu Educators' Award, 2014;
- Neoh Kah Thong, The Venerable Wei Wu (born 1949), abbot; founder of the International Buddhist College, 2005;
- Soo Khin Wah (1957–2019), sinologist; associate professor of the Department of Chinese Studies in the University of Malaya, 1989–2013;
- Chuah Hean Teik (born 1961), university president of Universiti Tunku Abdul Rahman, 2008–2019;
- Ewe Hong Tat (born 1967), university president of Universiti Tunku Abdul Rahman, 2019–present;
- Chew Kok Wei, the first Malaysian gold medalist in the International Physics Olympiad, 2011;

=== Athletics ===
- Fong Seow Hor (1937–2022), swimmer, represented Malaya in the swimming events of the 1956 Summer Olympics and 1960 Summer Olympics;
- Zy Kher Lee (born 2006), para swimmer, gold medalist in the boy's 200m freestyle S1-5 category of the 2021 Asian Youth Para Games.

=== Journalists ===
- Cheng Khee Chien (born 1955), press secretary of Mahathir Mohamad, 2001–2003; editor-in-chief of Nanyang Siang Pau, 2004–2007;
- Yong Soo Heong (born 1955), chief executive officer of Bernama, 2013–2014;

=== Politicians ===
==== Malaysian politicians ====
- Yeung Kwo (1919–1956), Deputy Secretary General of the Malayan Communist Party, 1947–1956;
- Michael Chen (1932–2024), Minister of Housing and Local Government (BN-GERAKAN), 1978–1979; President of the Dewan Negara (BN-MCA), 2000–2003;
- Song Ban Kheng (1924–1986), Member of the Penang State Legislative Assembly for Pekan Bukit Mertajam (BN-MCA), 1982–1986;
- Tan Seng Giaw (born 1942), Member of the Dewan Rakyat for Kepong (PR-DAP), 1982–2018;
- Kee Yong Wee (born 1936), Member of the Dewan Negara (BN-MCA), 1982–1988;
- Lai Kuan Fook (born 1935), Member of the Perlis State Legislative Assembly for Titi Tinggi (BN-MCA), 1986–1990;
- Ong Tin Kim (1938–1997), Member of the Dewan Rakyat for Teluk Intan (BN-GERAKAN), 1986–1997;
- Koh Tsu Koon (born 1949), Chief Minister of Penang (BN-GERAKAN), 1990–2008;
- Lee Kah Choon (born 1960), Member of the Dewan Rakyat for Jelutong (BN-GERAKAN), 1999–2008;
- Ng Wei Aik (born 1977), Member of the Dewan Rakyat for Tanjong (PR-DAP), 2013–2018;
- Sim Tze Tzin (born 1976), Deputy Minister of Agriculture and Agro-based Industry (PH-PKR), 2018–2020;
- Wong Hon Wai (born 1973), Member of the Dewan Rakyat for Bukit Bendera (PH-DAP), 2018–2022;
- Joseph Ng (born 1980), Member of the Penang State Legislative Assembly for Air Itam (PH-DAP), 2018–present.

==== Singaporean politicians ====
- Lee Khoon Choy (1924–2016), Senior Minister of State in the Prime Minister's Office (PAP), 1979–1985;
- Khaw Boon Wan (born 1952), Minister for Transport (PAP), 2015–2020.

==== Supranational politicians ====
- Chan Kai Yau, Secretary-General of ASEAN, 1982–1984.

=== Scientists ===
- Chumpon Chantharakulpongsa, Thai neurosurgeon;
- Lam Su Shiung (born 1981), recipient of the 2020 Top Research Scientists Malaysia Award (TRSM);
- Ming Tatt Cheah (born 1983), immunologist;

=== Writers ===
- Lin Jun Jing (born 1937), poet; he is theorised to be Han Yu Zhen, author of The Jasmine Princess (1963), a landmark poem in Malaysian Chinese literature;
- Lee Kim Chong (1947–2017), writer and historian;
- Fu Cheng De (born 1959), poet;
- Low Lim Wah (born 1959), columnist and comic artist;

=== Other notable alumni ===
- Chen Qingshan (1919–2003), major general of the People's Liberation Army, 1964–1984;
- Ngan Ching Wen (1932–2011), philanthropist;
- Woon Wen Kin (born 1938), maestro and founding president of the Penang Philharmonic Orchestra, 1981;
- Lee Yee (1952–1980), influential singer;
- Hong Juk Hee, news anchor of NTV7, 1997–2006;
- Law Chu Hian (1964–2018), news anchor of NTV7, 2002–2005;
- Axian (born 1975), food critic and television host on Astro;
- Adrian Teh (born 1984), film director.
- Jho Low, businessman and international fugitive, most infamously known for his involvement in the 1MDB scandal.

== Students ==
- Zy Kher Lee (born 2006), Para swimming Athlete

== Gallery ==
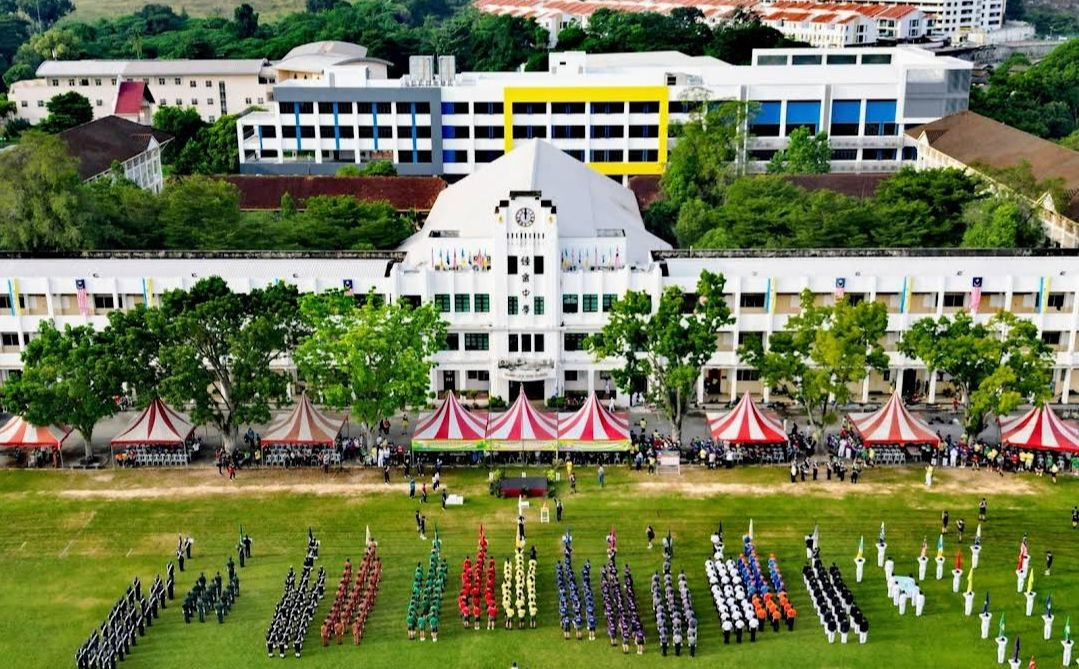

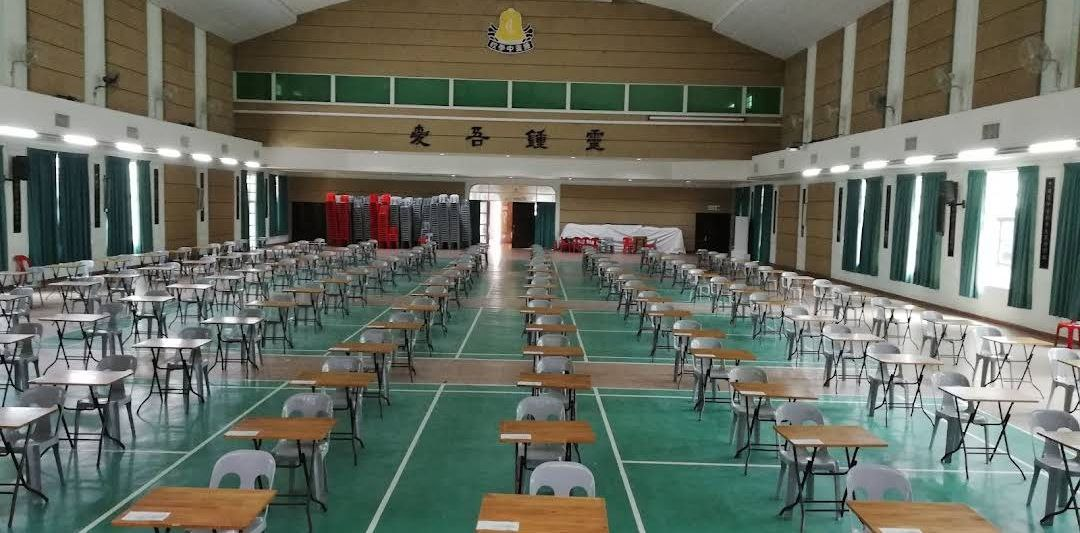

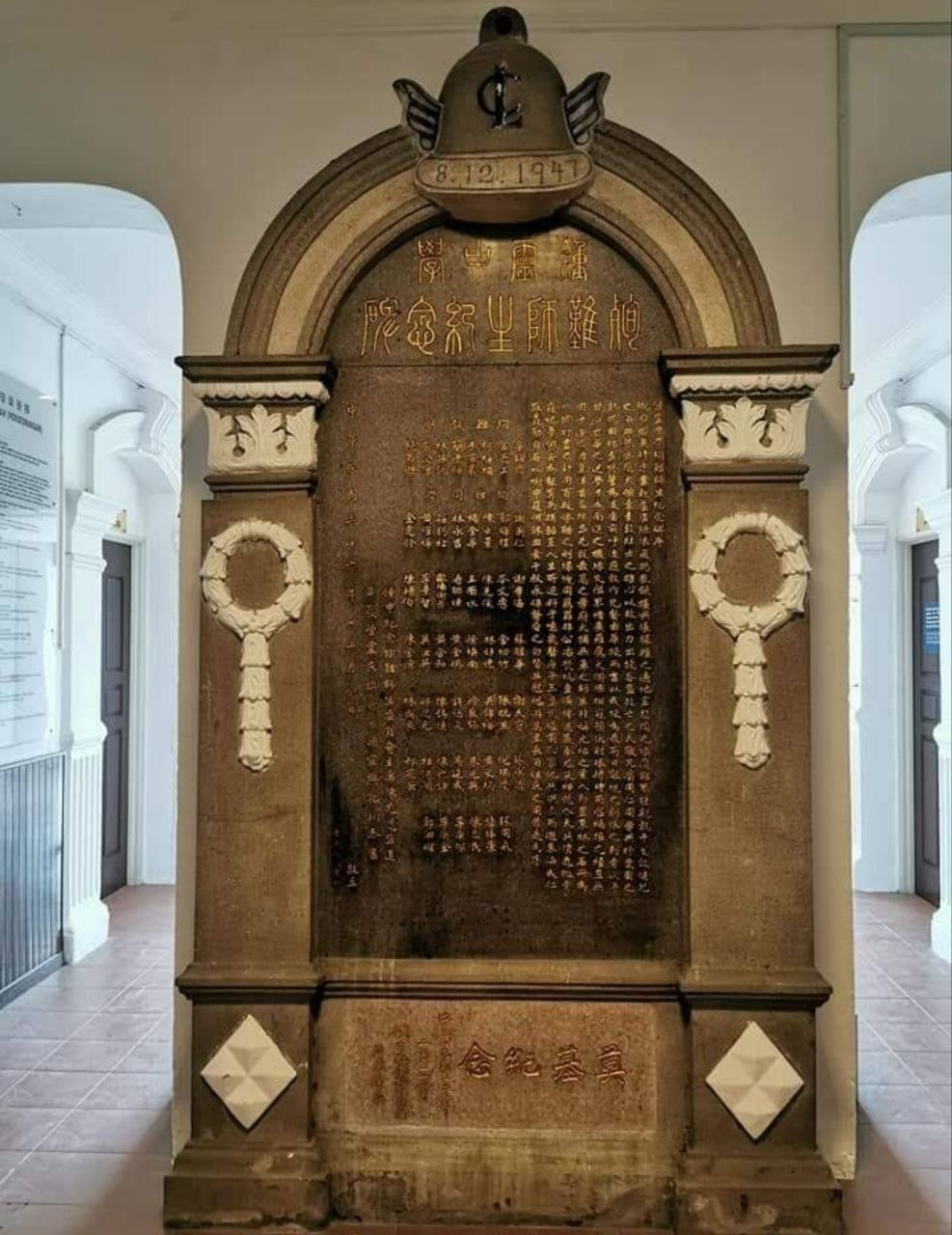

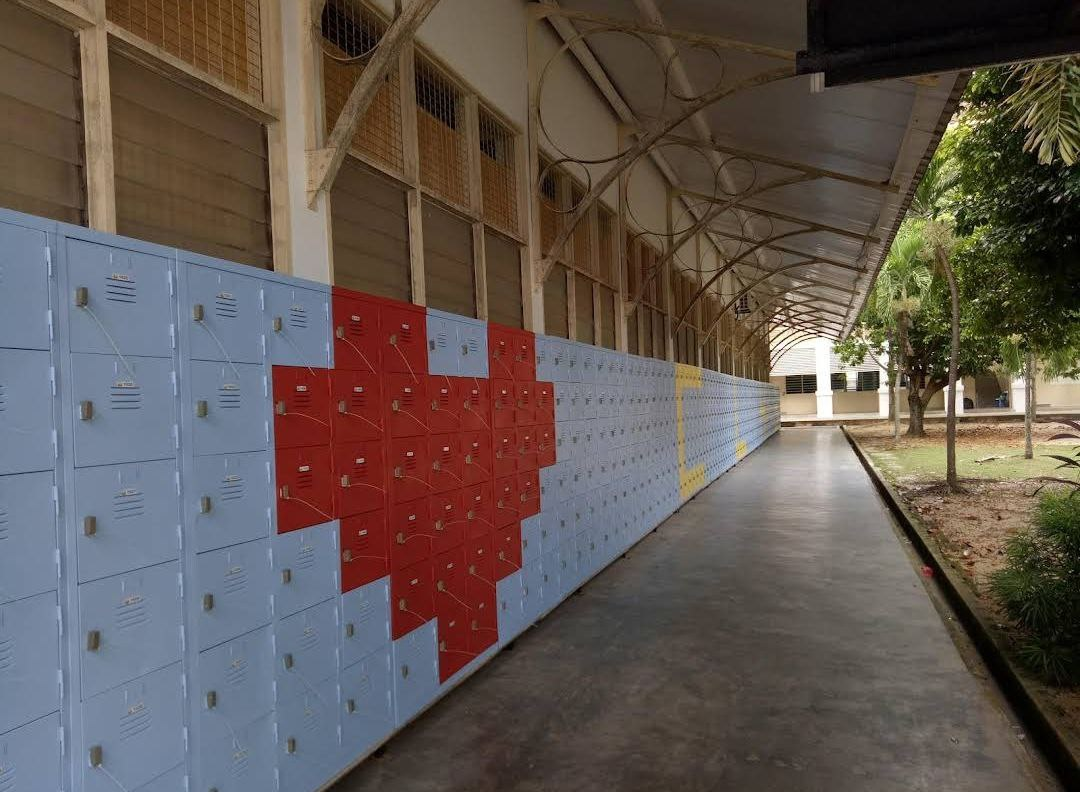

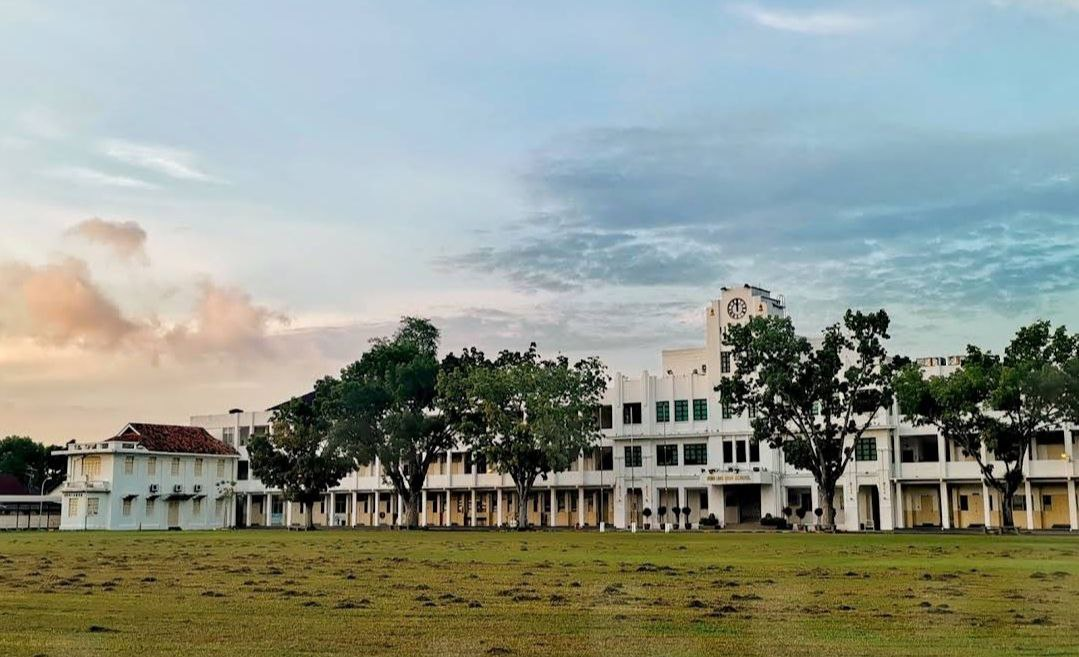

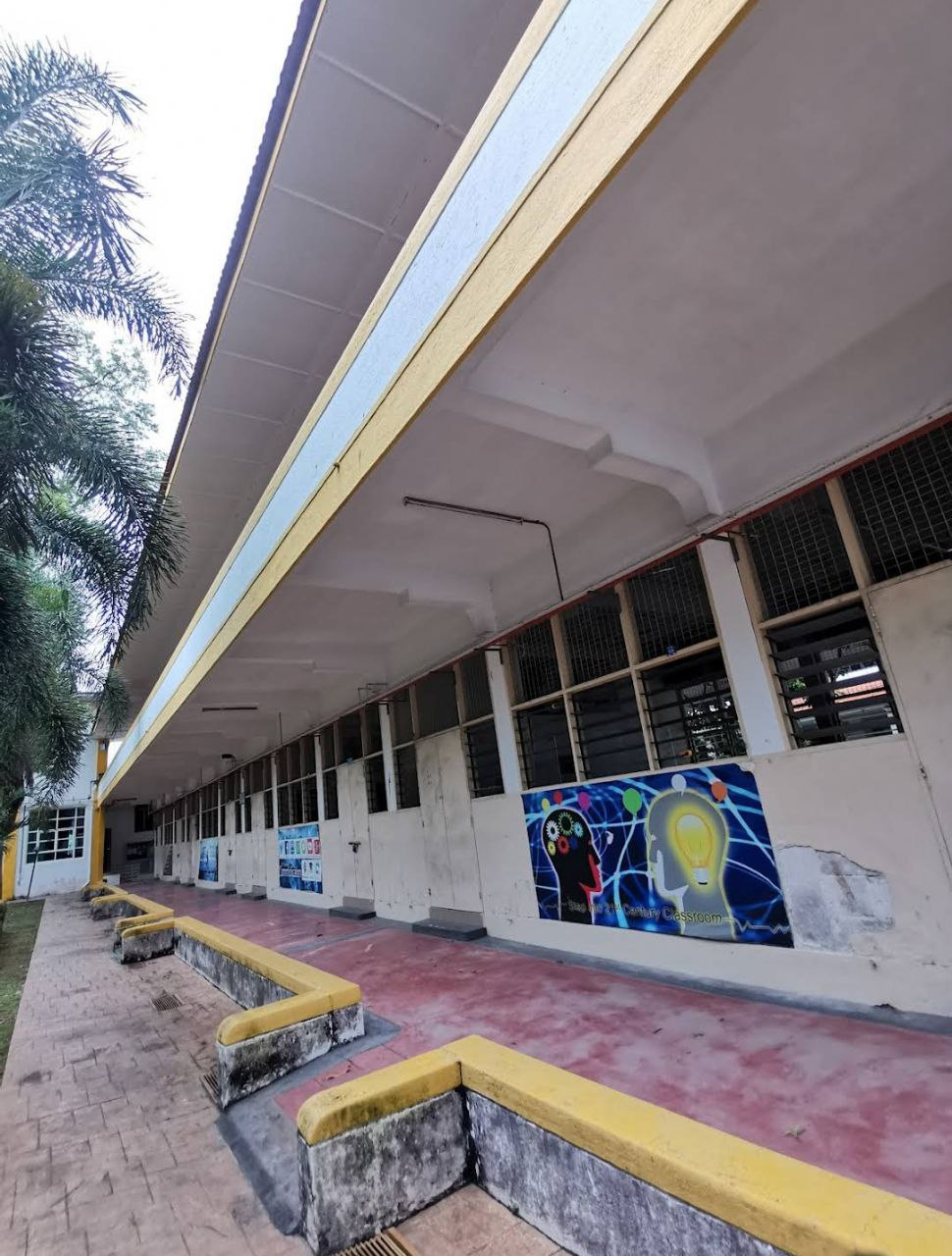

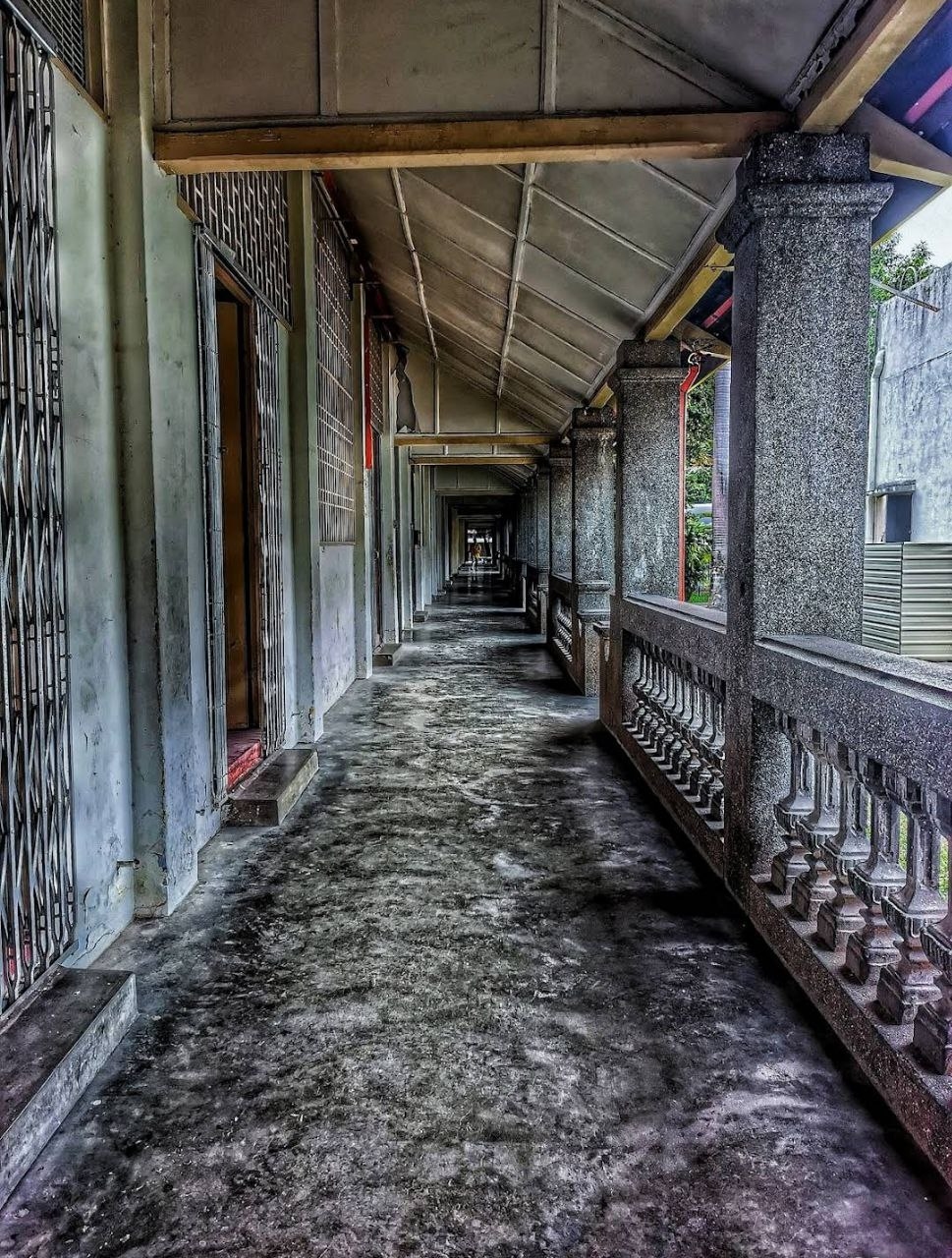

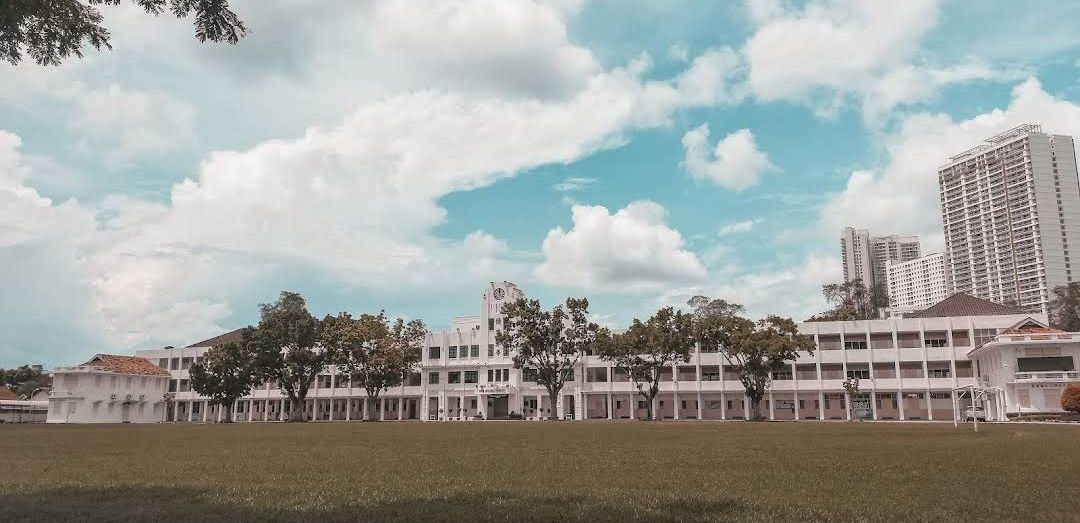

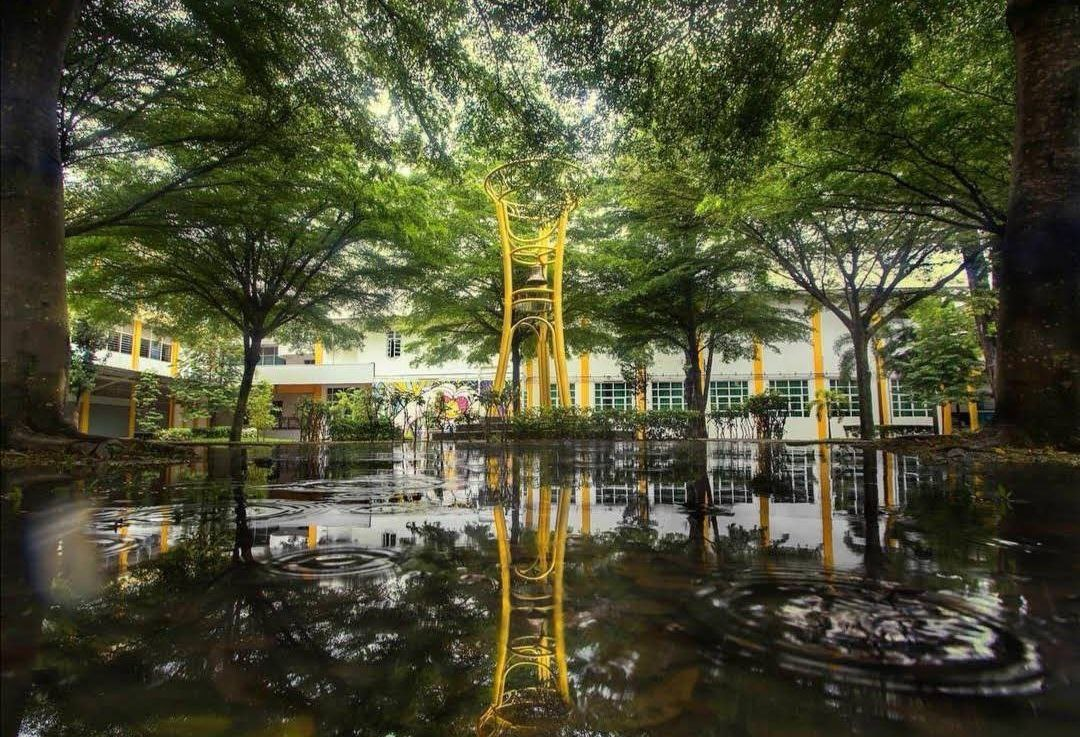

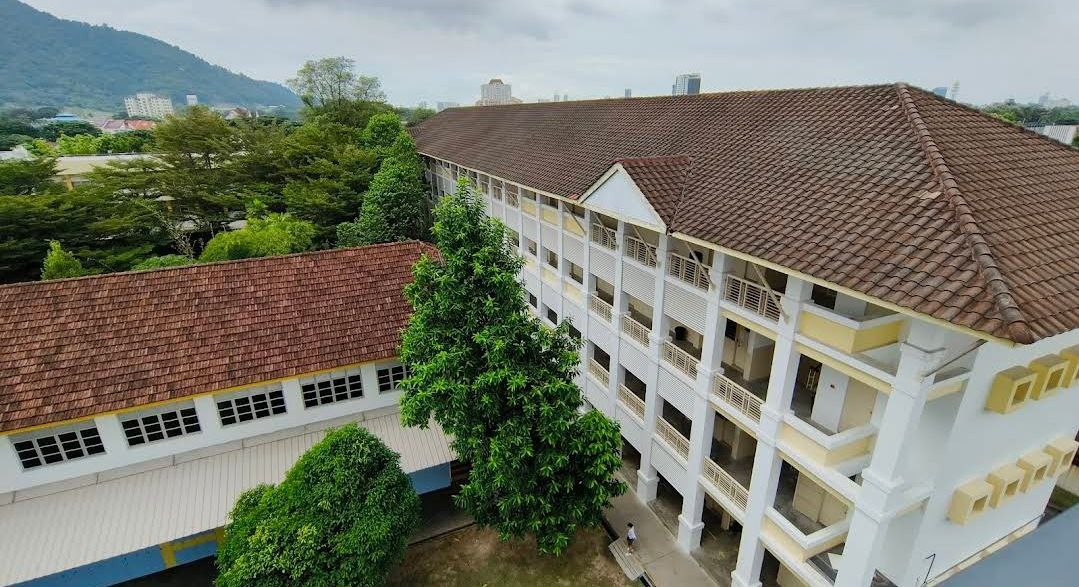

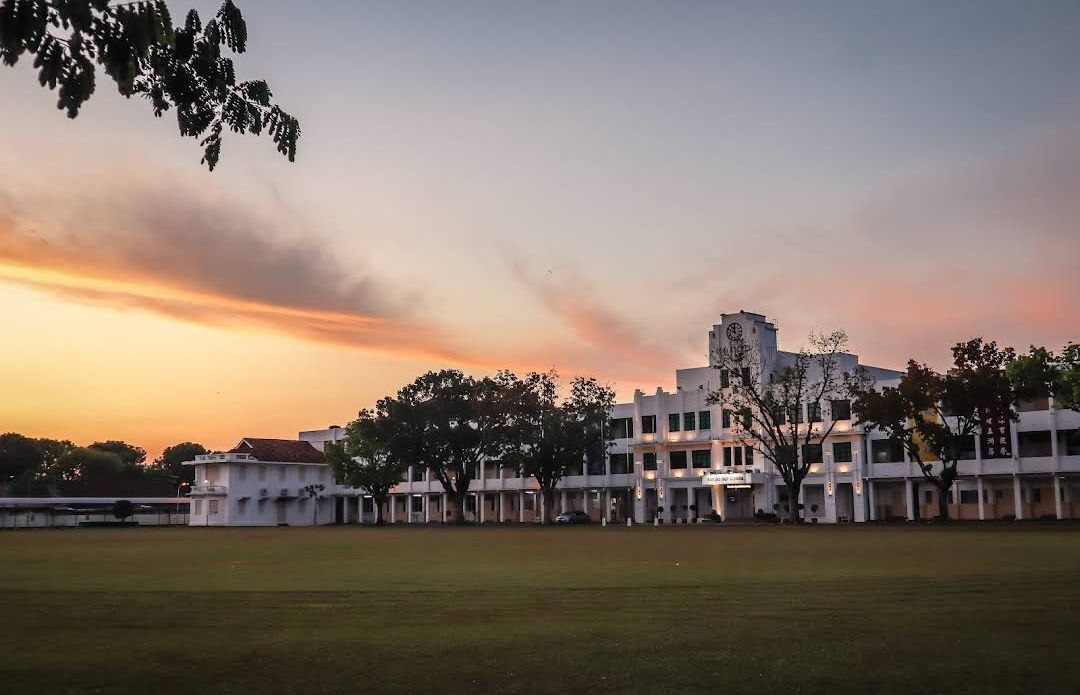

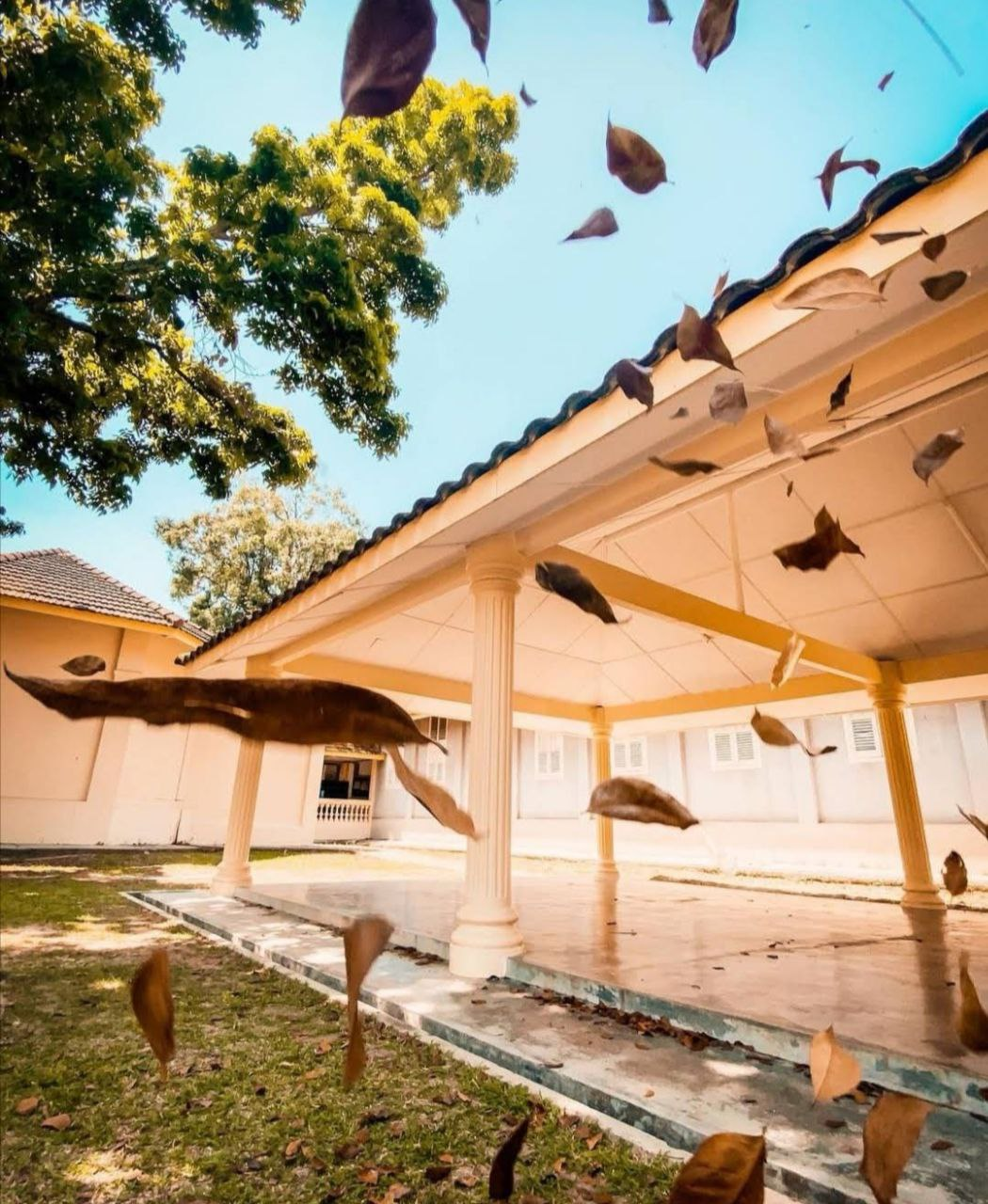

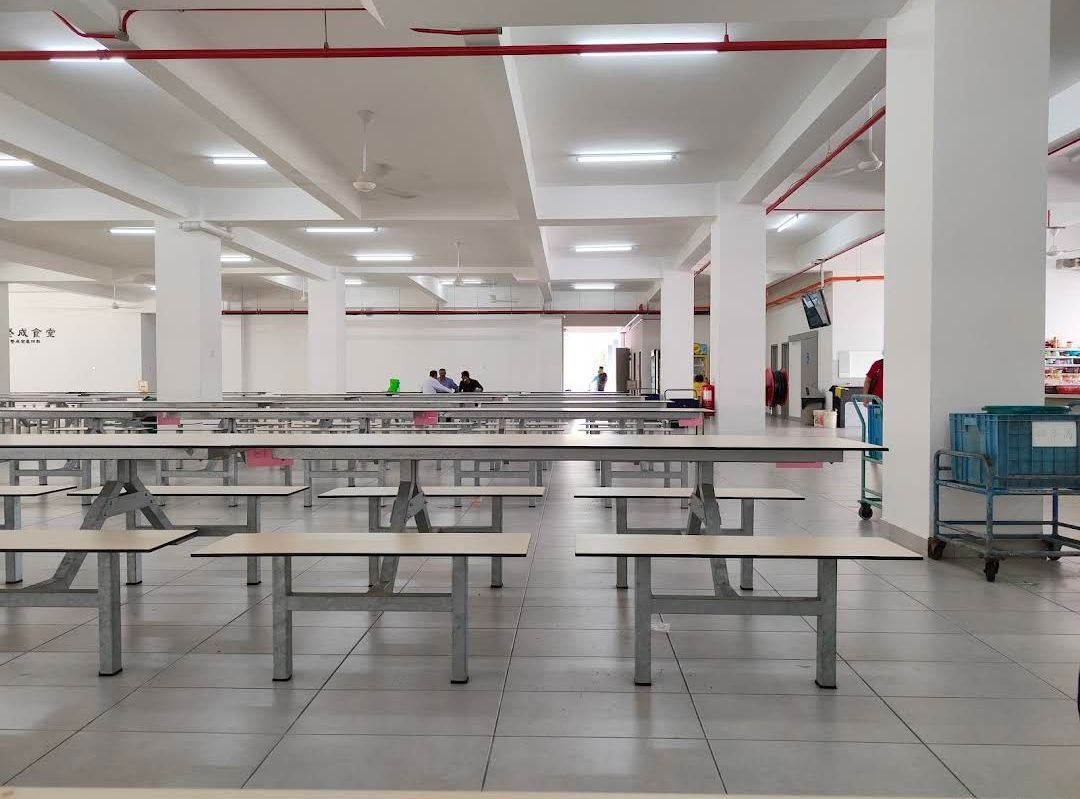

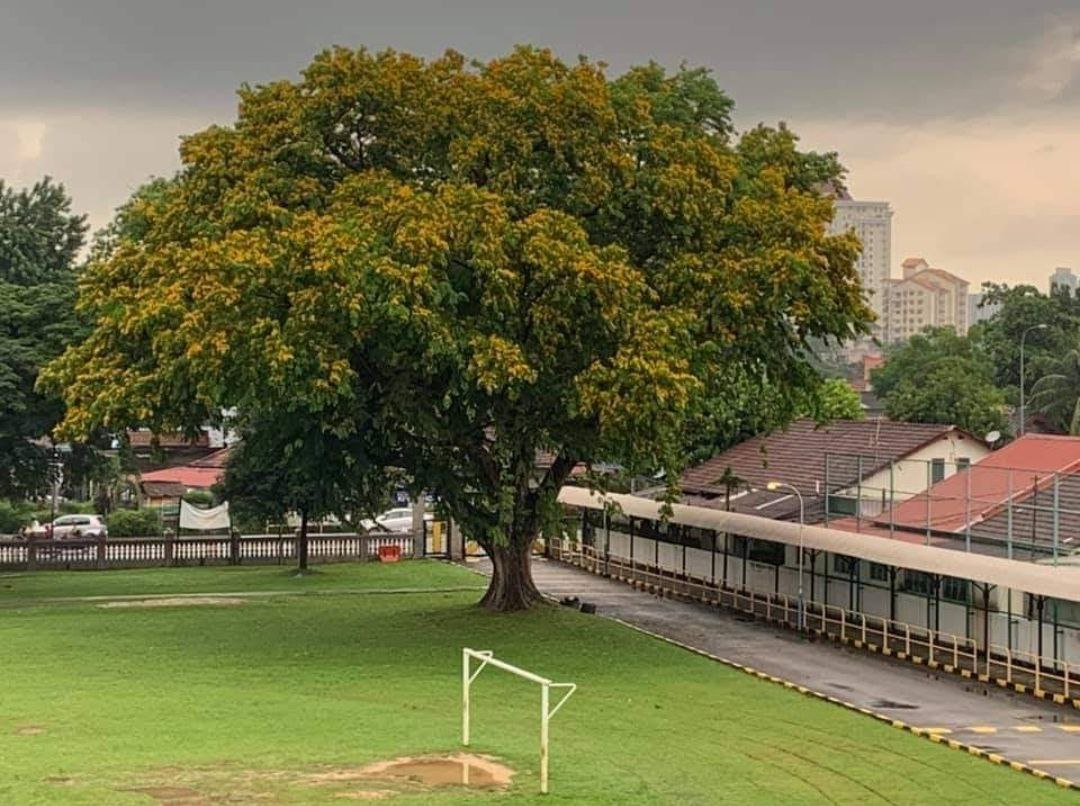

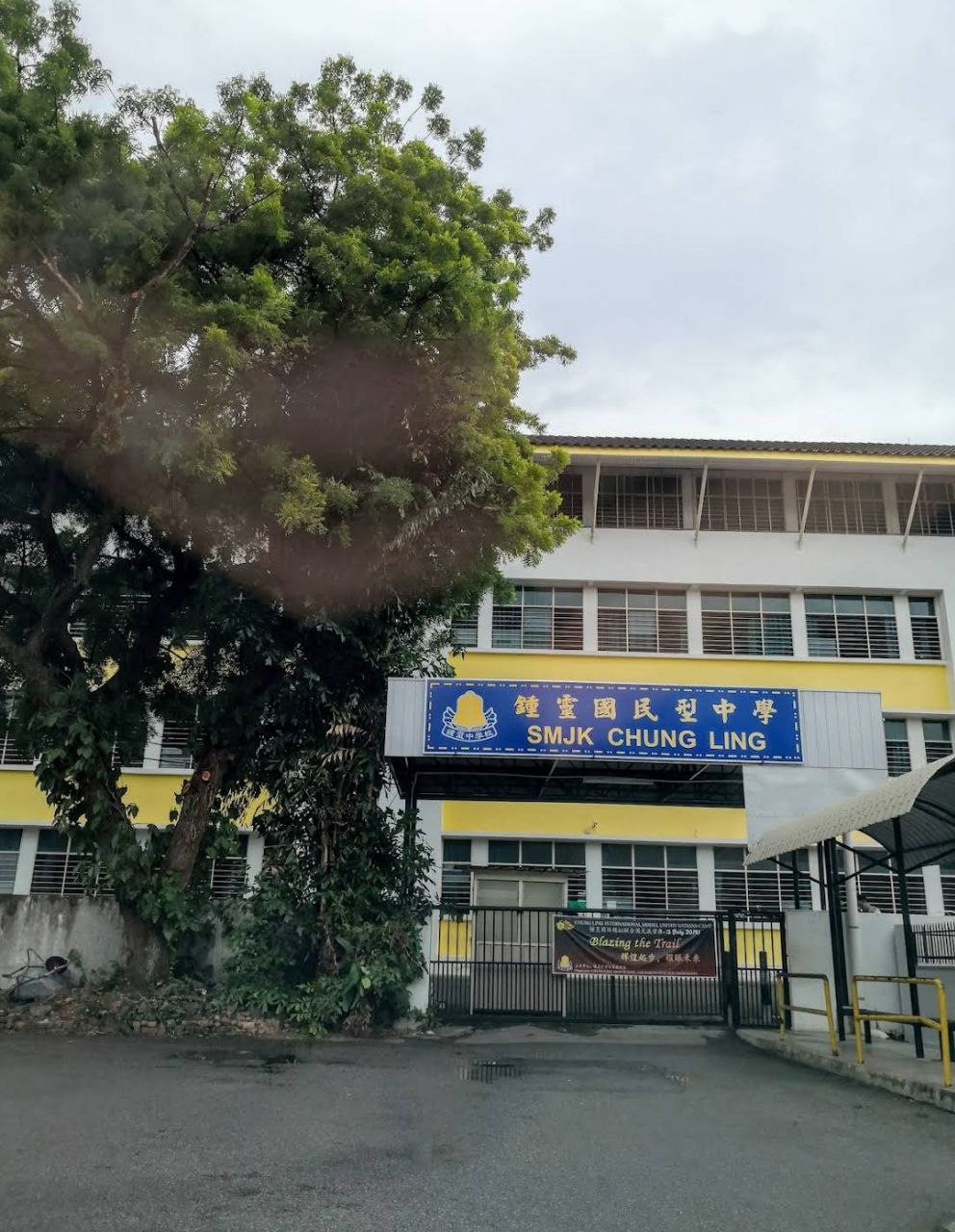

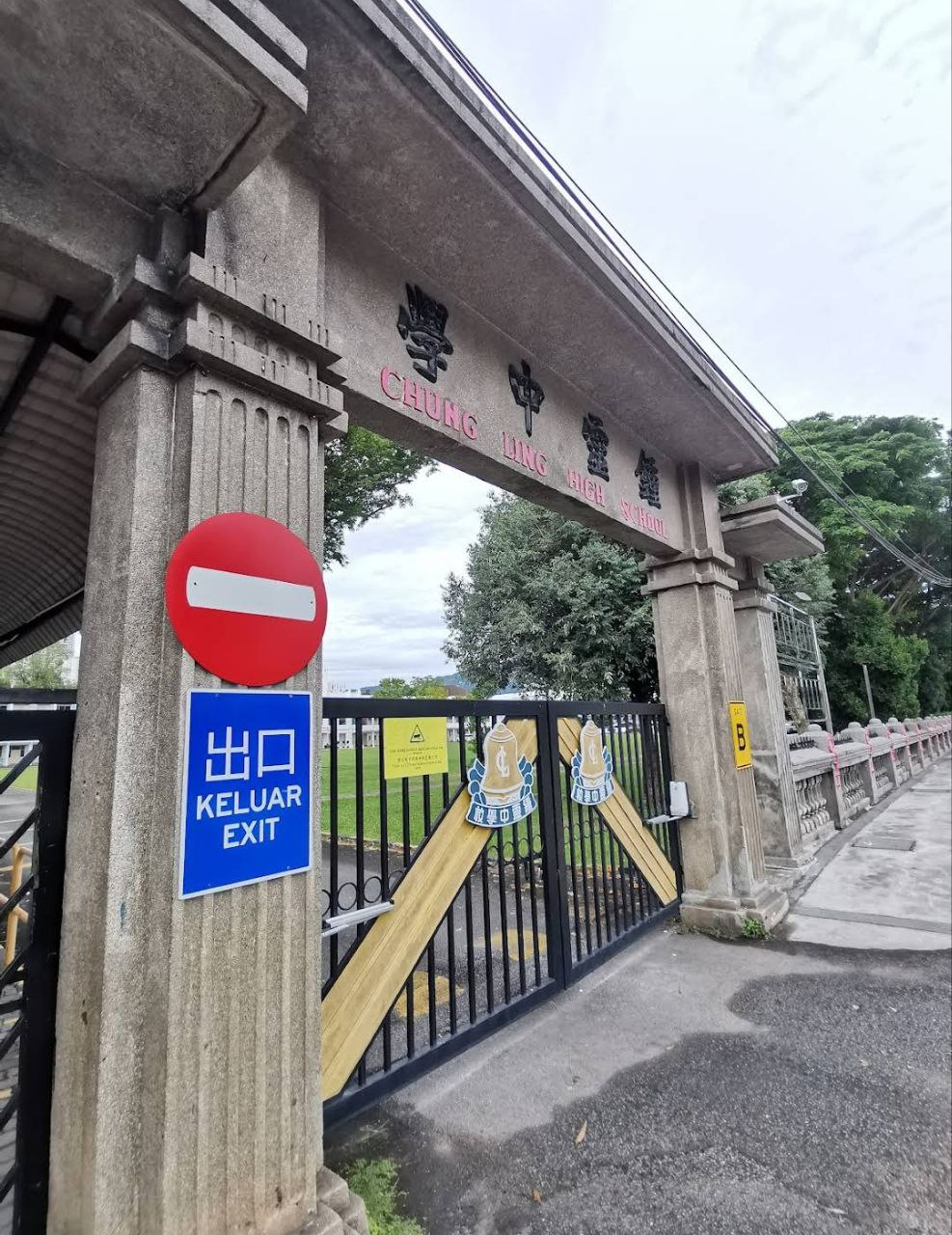

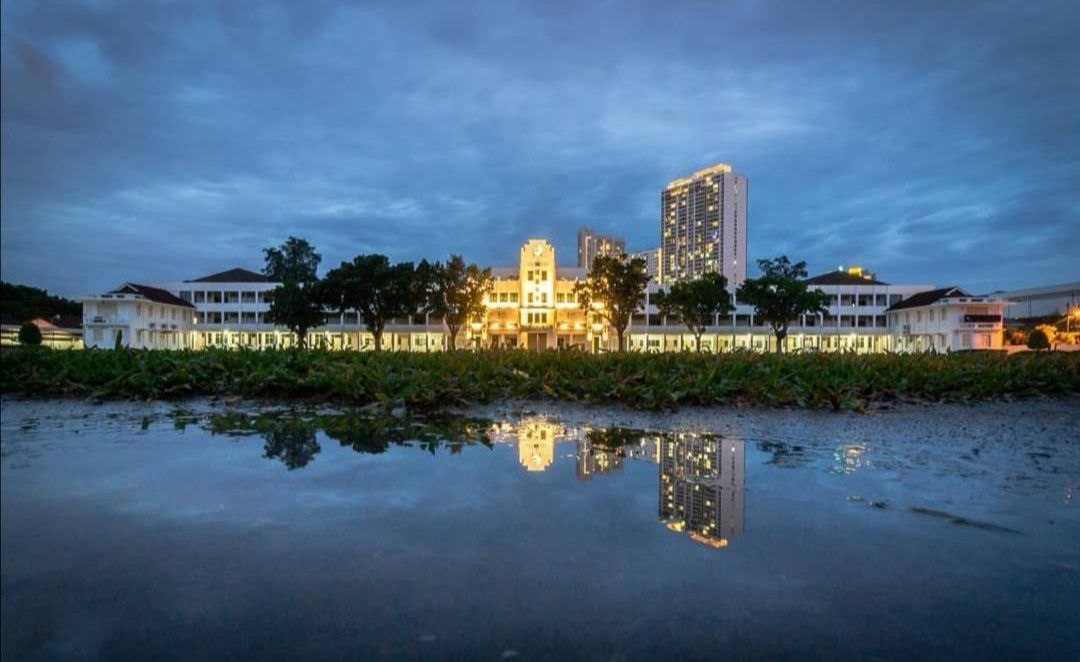

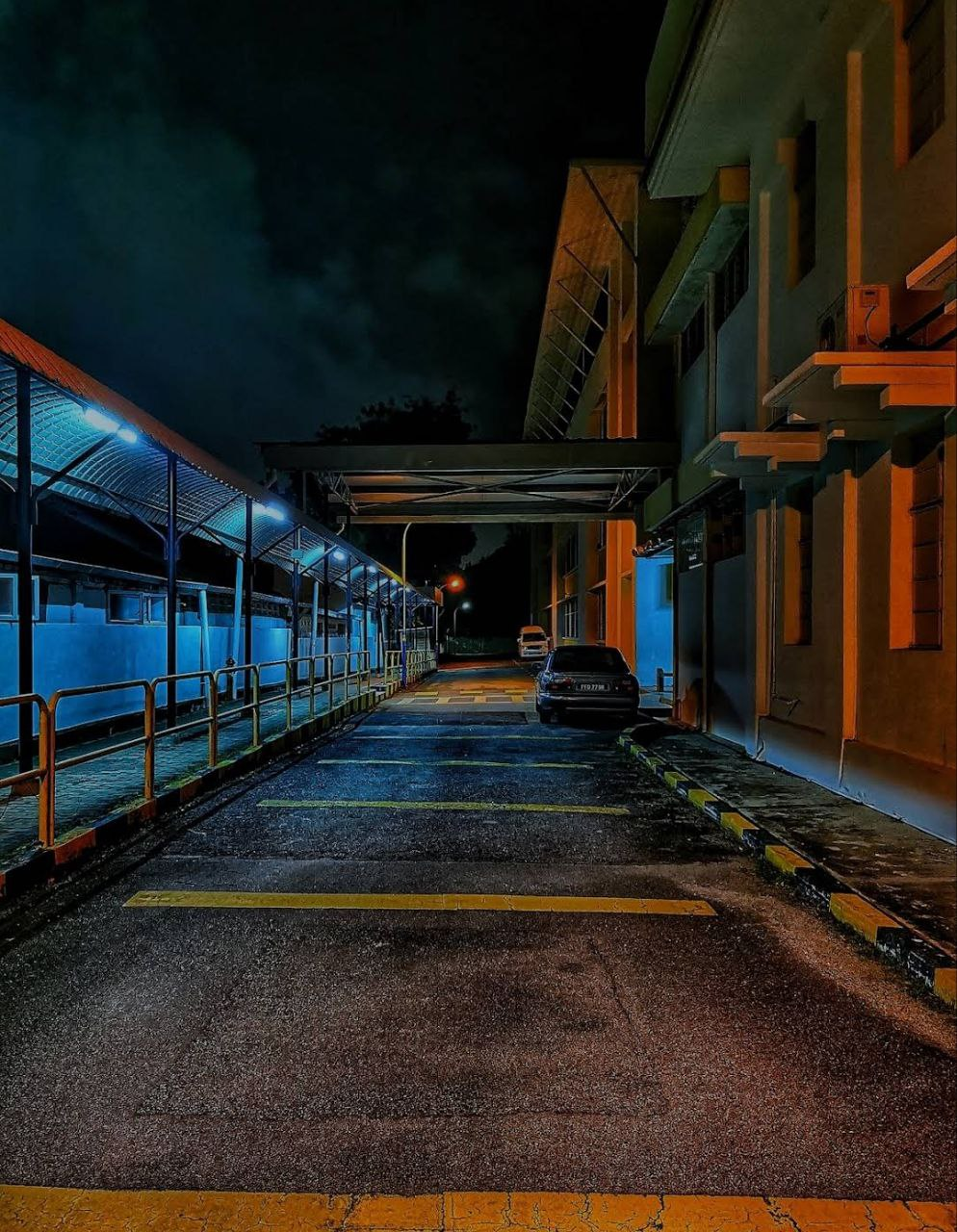

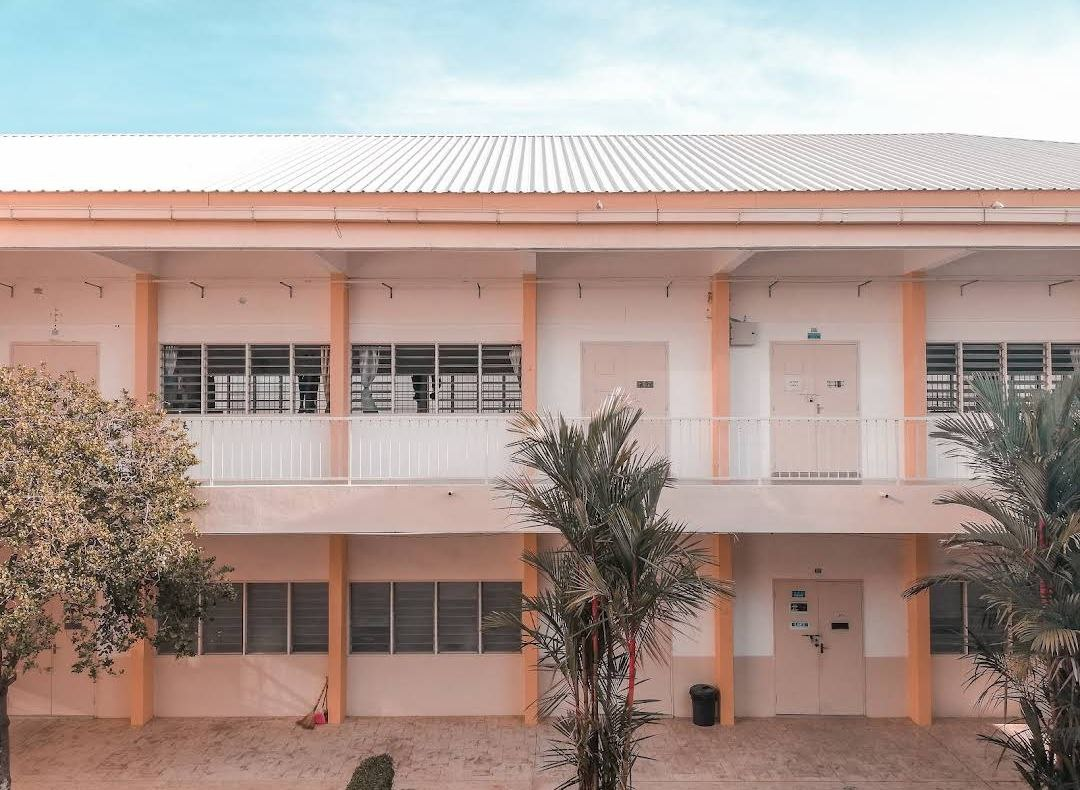

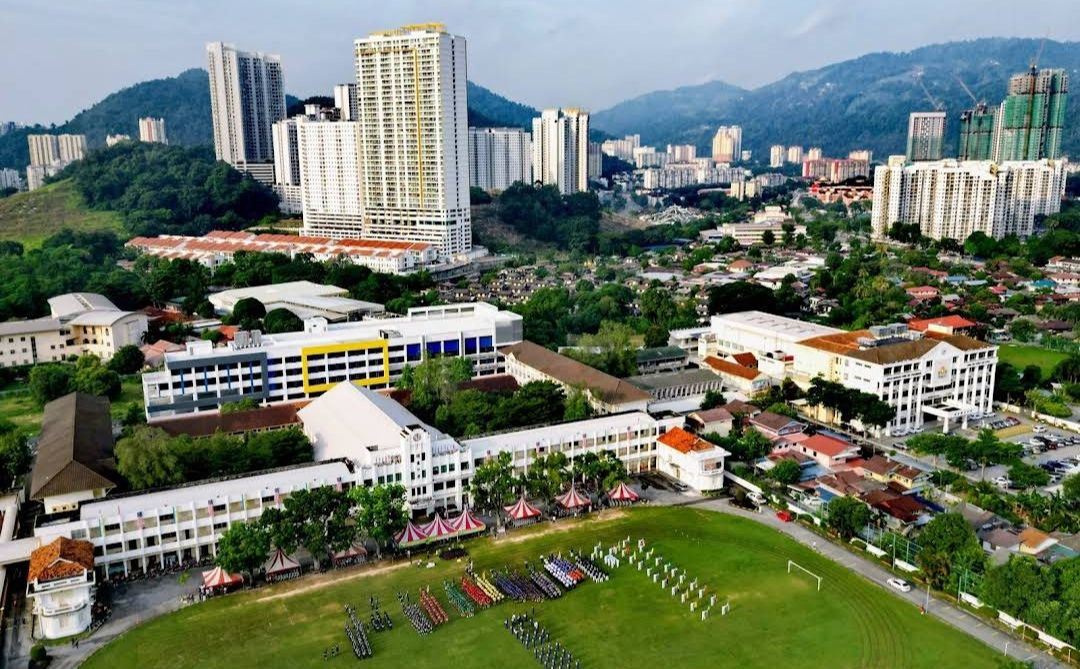

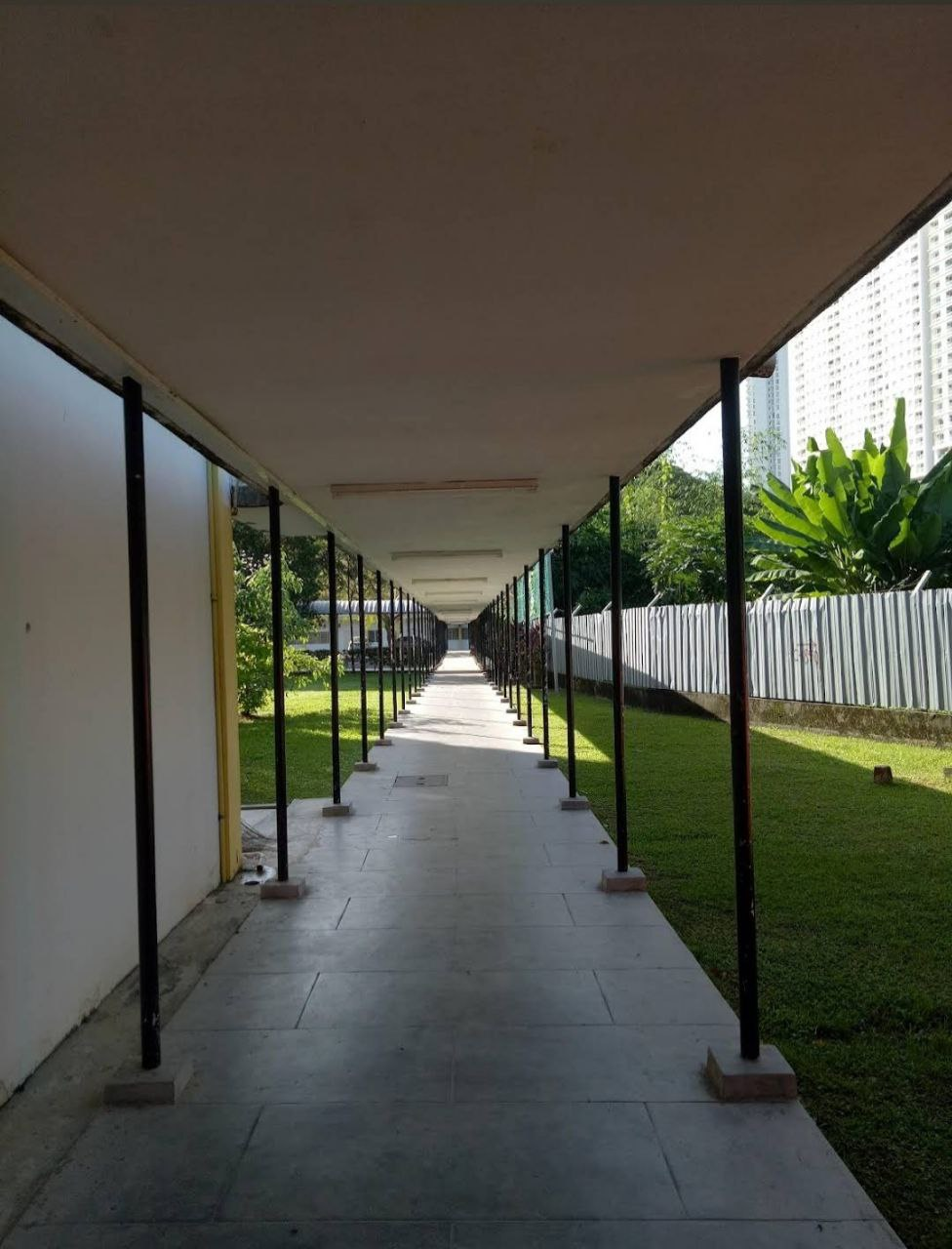

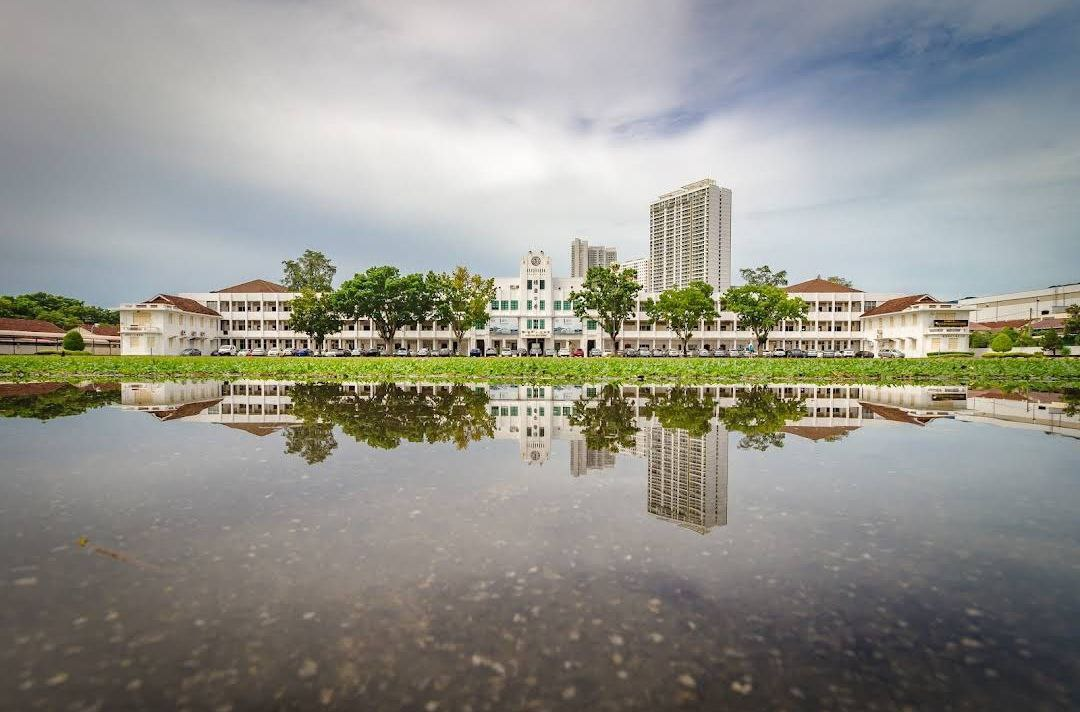

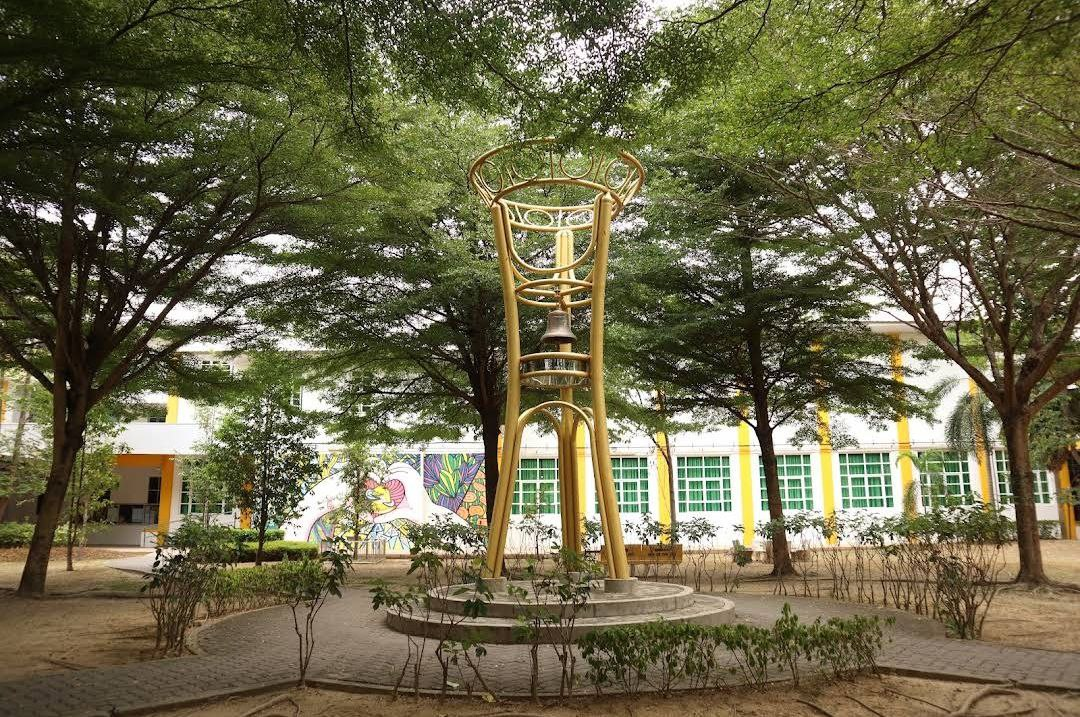

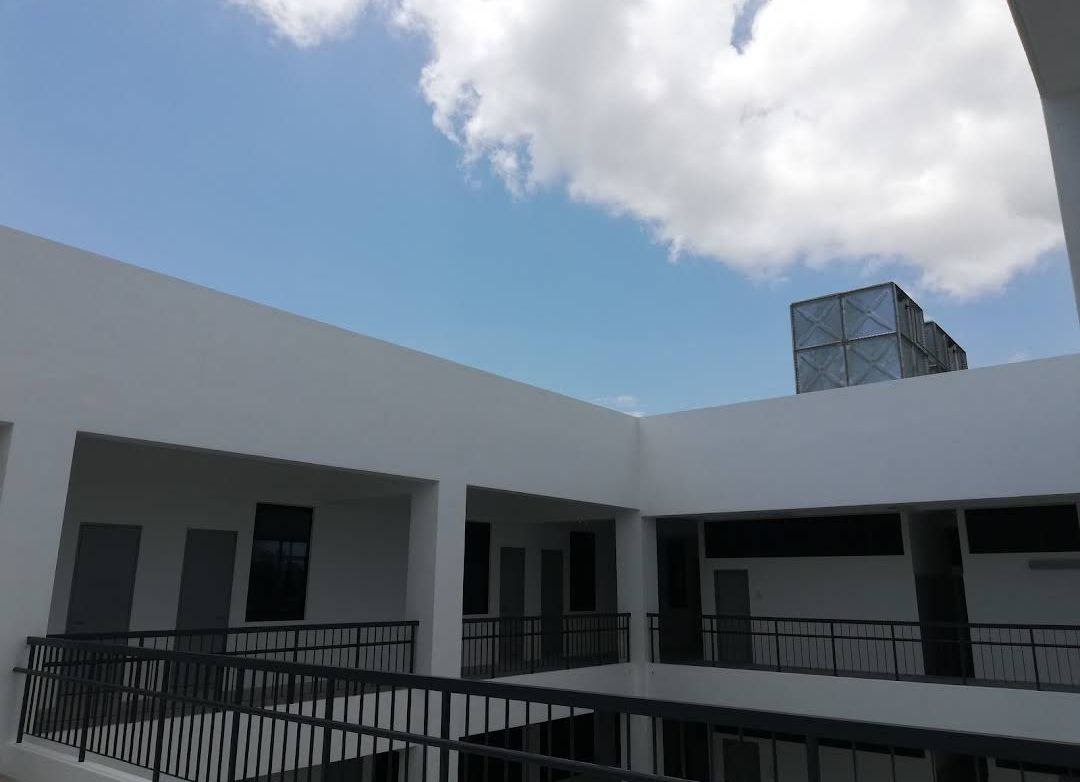

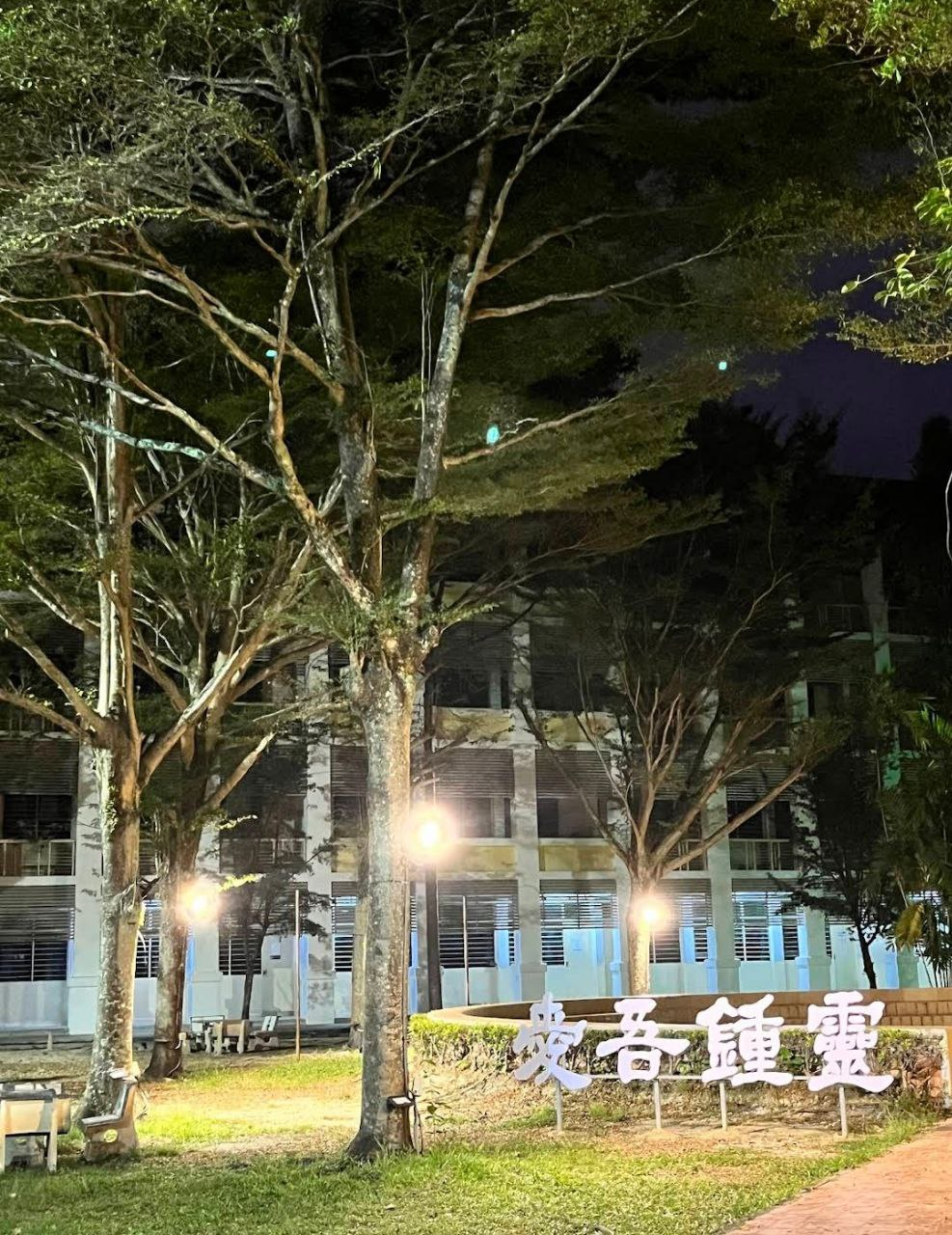

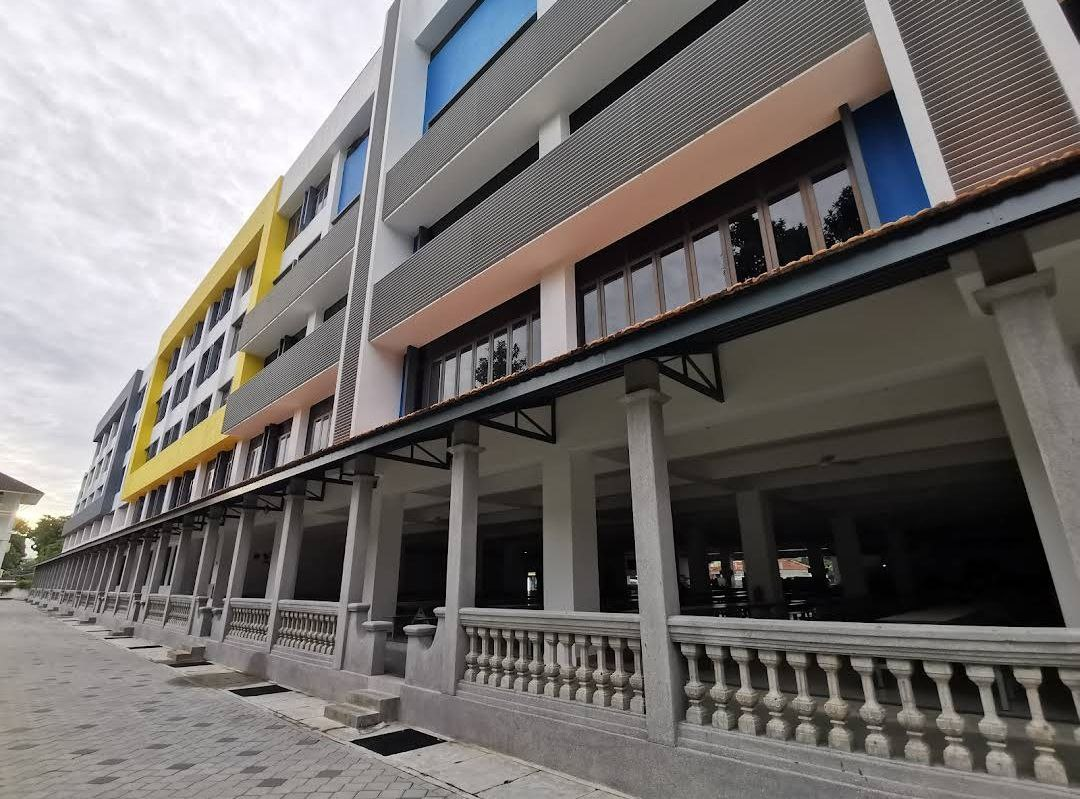

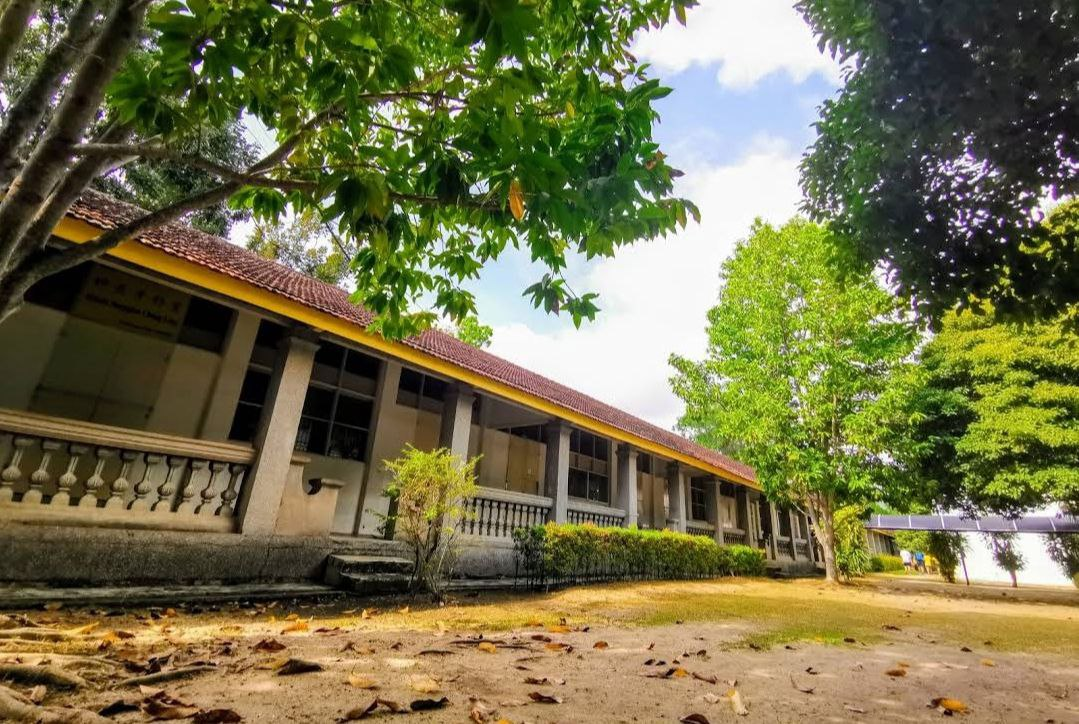

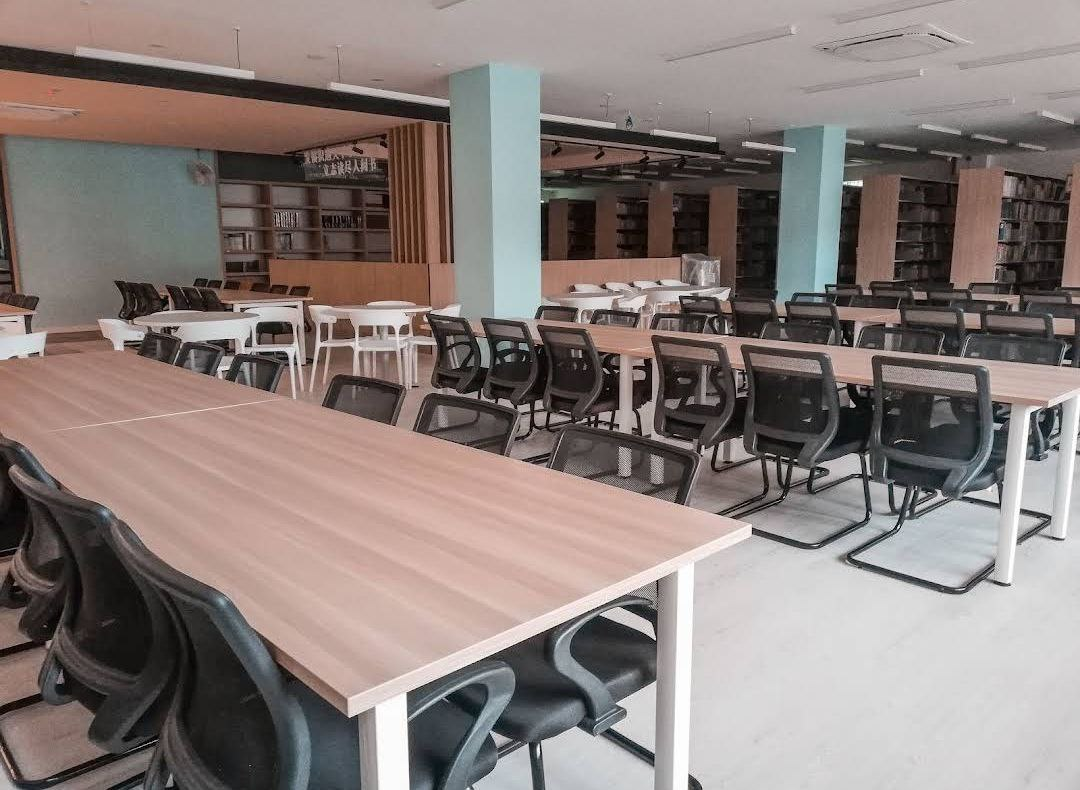

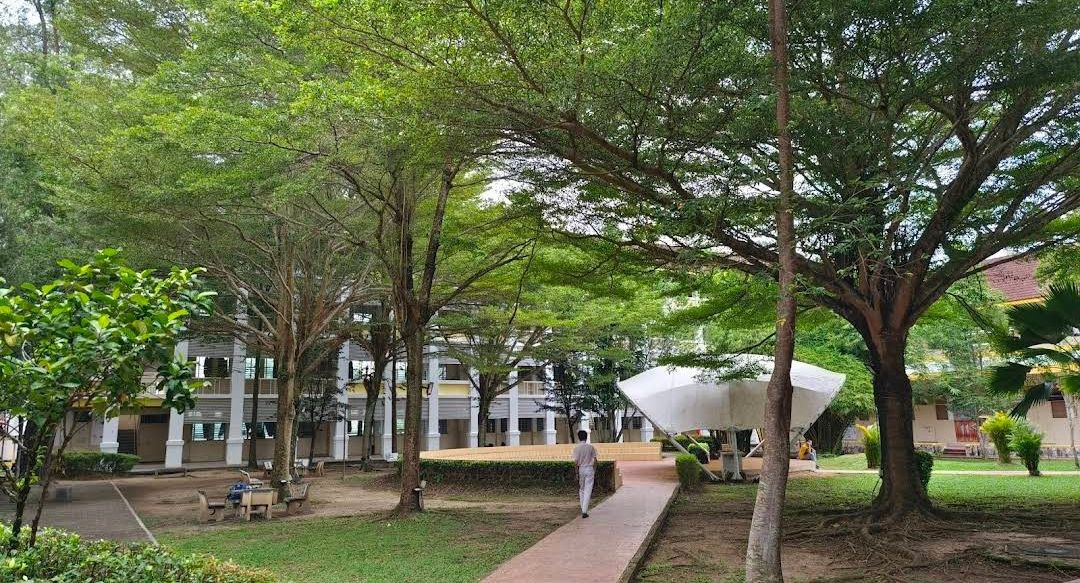

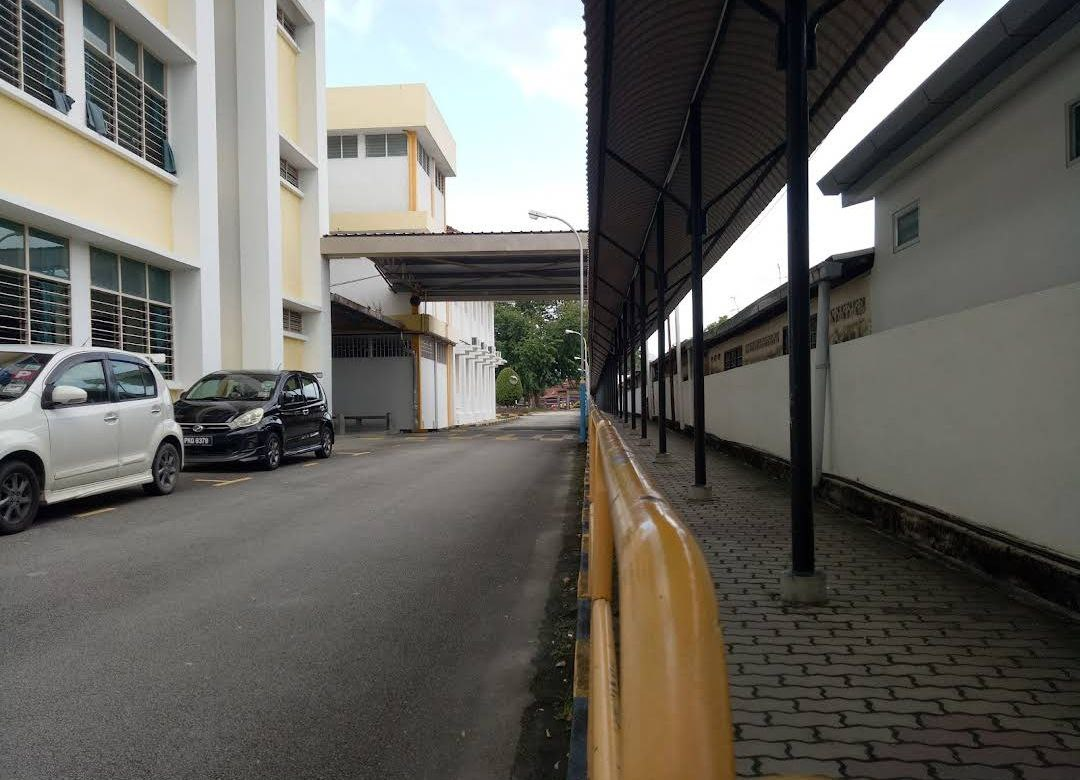
