= Type 680 training ship =

Chinese training ship

Qi Jiguang
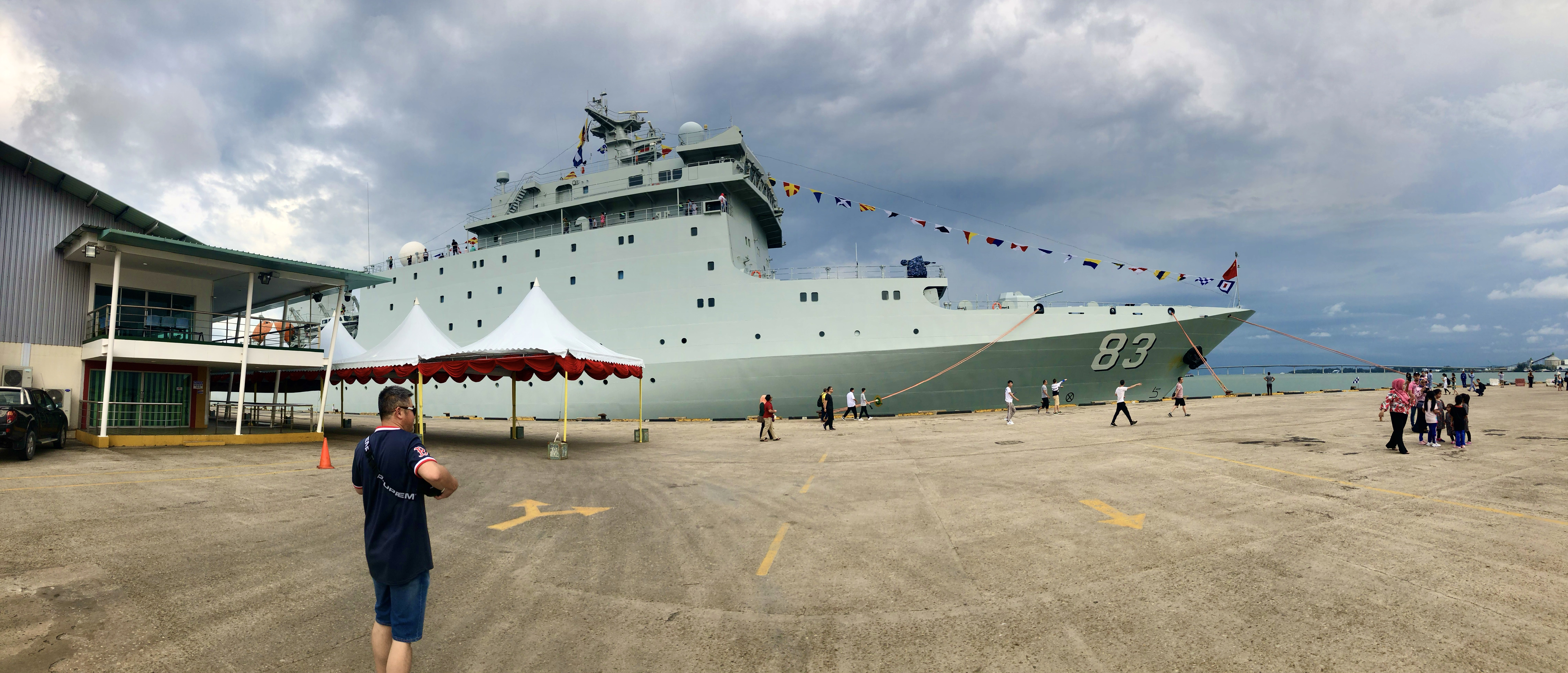
- Qi Jiguang in Brunei, 2019

History

China
- Name: Qi Jiguang; (戚继光舰)
- Namesake: Qi Jiguang
- Builder: Liaonan Shipyard, Dalian
- Completed: November 2016
- Commissioned: 21 February 2017
- In service: 2017-Present
- Home port: Dalian, Liaoning
- Identification: Pennant number: AX-83
- Nickname(s): NATO reporting name Dadu
- Status: Active

General characteristics
- Type: Training ship
- Displacement: 9000 t
- Length: 163 m (535 ft)
- Beam: 22 m (72 ft)
- Propulsion: 2 SEMT-Pielstick diesels, 2 shafts, 7,200 bhp
- Speed: 22 kn (41 km/h)
- Range: 10,000 nmi (18,520 km)
- Boats & landing craft carried: 2 x multi-purpose boats 2 x life boats
- Complement: Crew: 450; Instructors: 50; Cadets: 400
- Armament: 1 x 76 mm single H/PJ-26 2 x 30 mm H/PJ-17
- Aircraft carried: 1 Changhe Z-8

The Type 680 training ship with NATO reporting name Dadu, otherwise known as Qi Jiguang is a training ship of the People's Liberation Army Navy. It joined the PLA Navy on 21 February 2017.

== Construction and career ==
Qi Jiguang engaged in a number of training voyages around the Indo-Pacific Region in 2019, notably visiting Wellington in New Zealand between 22 and 26 October. Rear Admiral Yu Wenbing invited various New Zealanders to a courtesy reception scheduled for 29 October 2019. Victoria University of Wellington staff discussed whether it was appropriate to attend the reception; in the event, Assistant Vice-Chancellor Rebecca Needham, a former director of the VUW Confucius Institute, attended the event, along with several staff members of the university's Confucius Institute attended. The New Zealand Defence Force said the visit had been arranged through normal diplomatic channels.

On September 26, 2023 Qi Jiguang had a three day goodwill visit to Papua New Guinea.

=== 2024 stopover in Penang ===
In October 2024, Qi Jiguang and the amphibious vessel Jinggang Shan docked at Swettenham Pier in George Town, the capital city of the Malaysian state of Penang. During the stopover, the crew paid a courtesy call on the speaker of the Penang legislature Law Choo Kiang and toured the Penang State Assembly Building. Some of the crew also visited the Chung Ling Private High School, where they received a "friendly" reception to mark the 50th anniversary of China's diplomatic ties with Malaysia. After the visit, the two ships proceeded to Chittagong, Bangladesh.

The stopover led to criticism from Malaysia's right-wing Islamist opposition, led by the Malaysian Islamic Party (PAS), which accused the Anwar Ibrahim administration of compromising Malaysia's national sovereignty. The school lodged a police report against malicious social media content, while Penang state executive councillor Wong Hon Wai clarified that the crew who visited the school were tertiary students and not navy personnel. Some analysts have suggested that PAS intended to exploit the stopover to stir racial tensions and intimidate the country's Chinese minority by insinuating that China was collaborating with the Chinese community in Penang, the only Malaysian state continuously governed by ethnic Chinese since independence.

== Gallery ==
Qi Jiguang Gallery

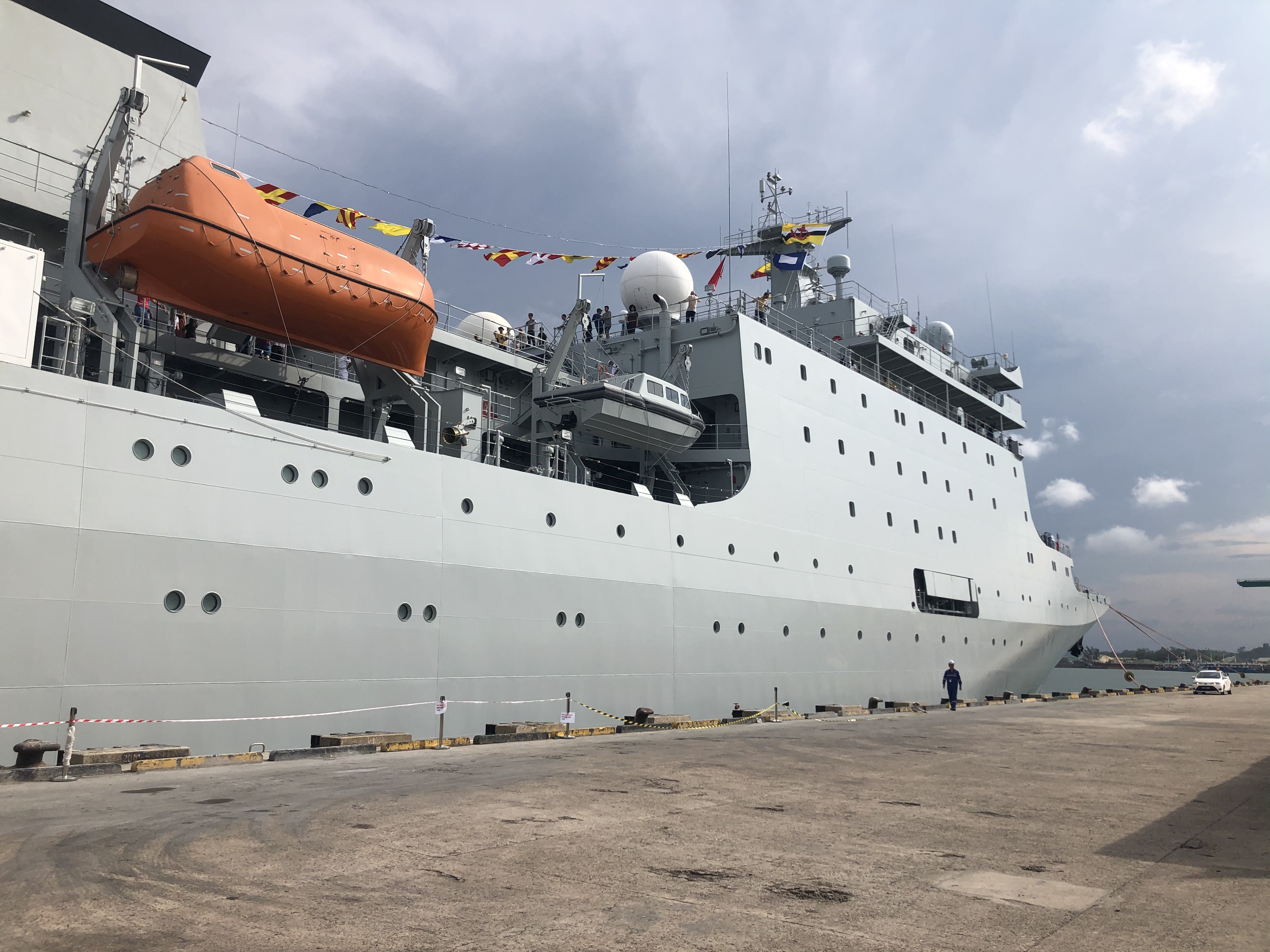
Qi Jiguang’s starboard side.

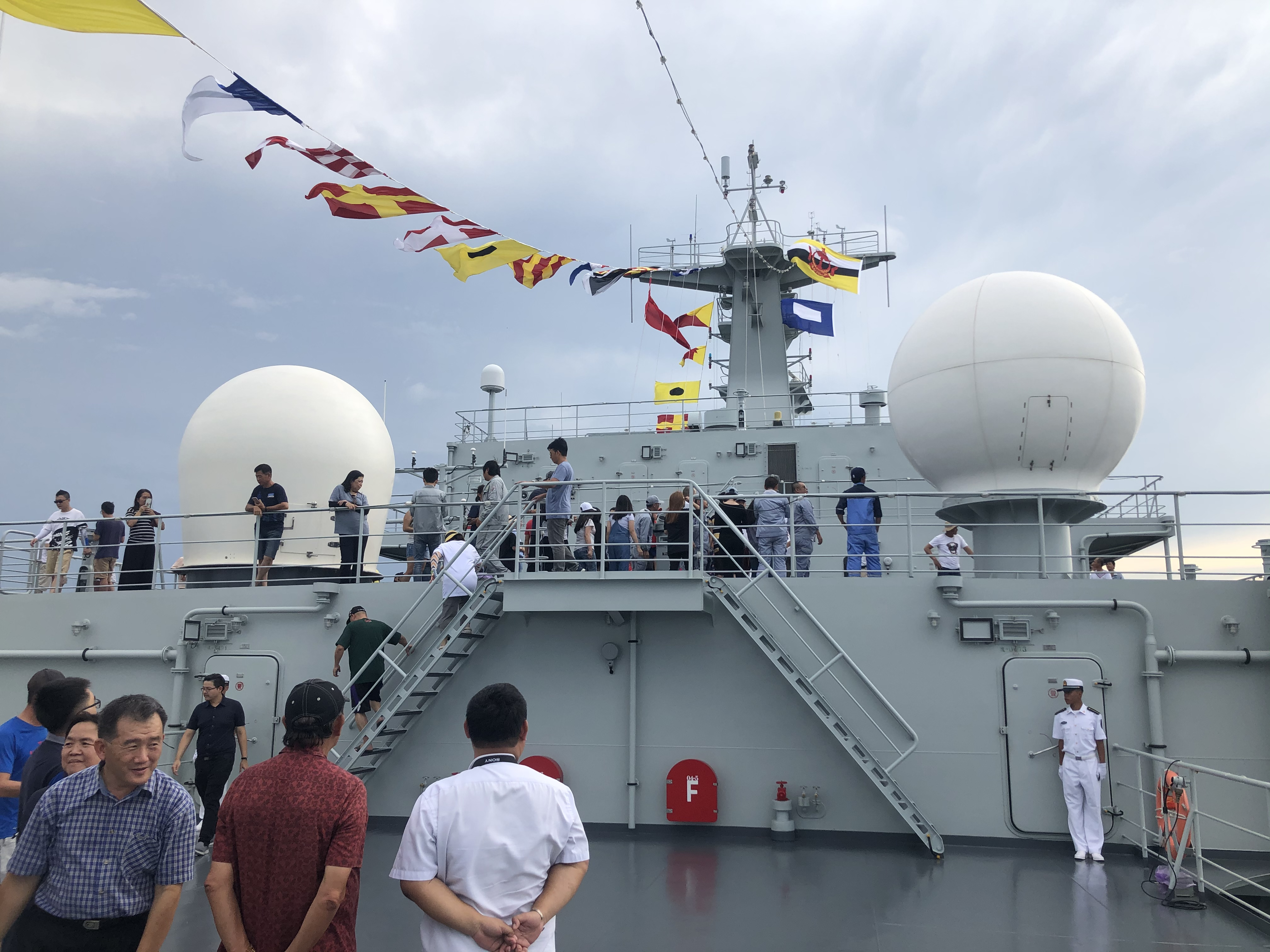
Qi Jiguang’s midship antenna and radar arrays.

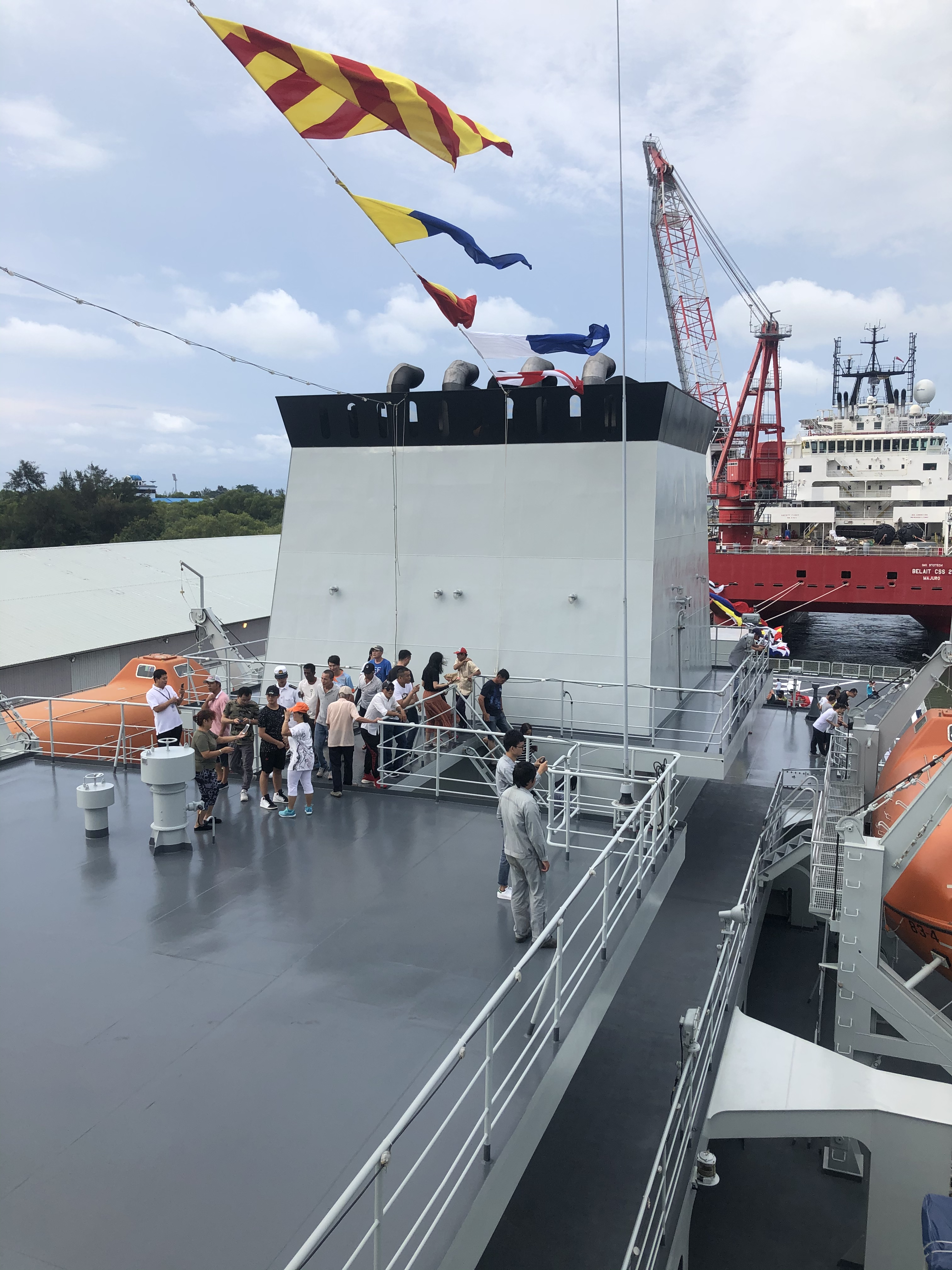
Qi Jiguang’s smoke stack.

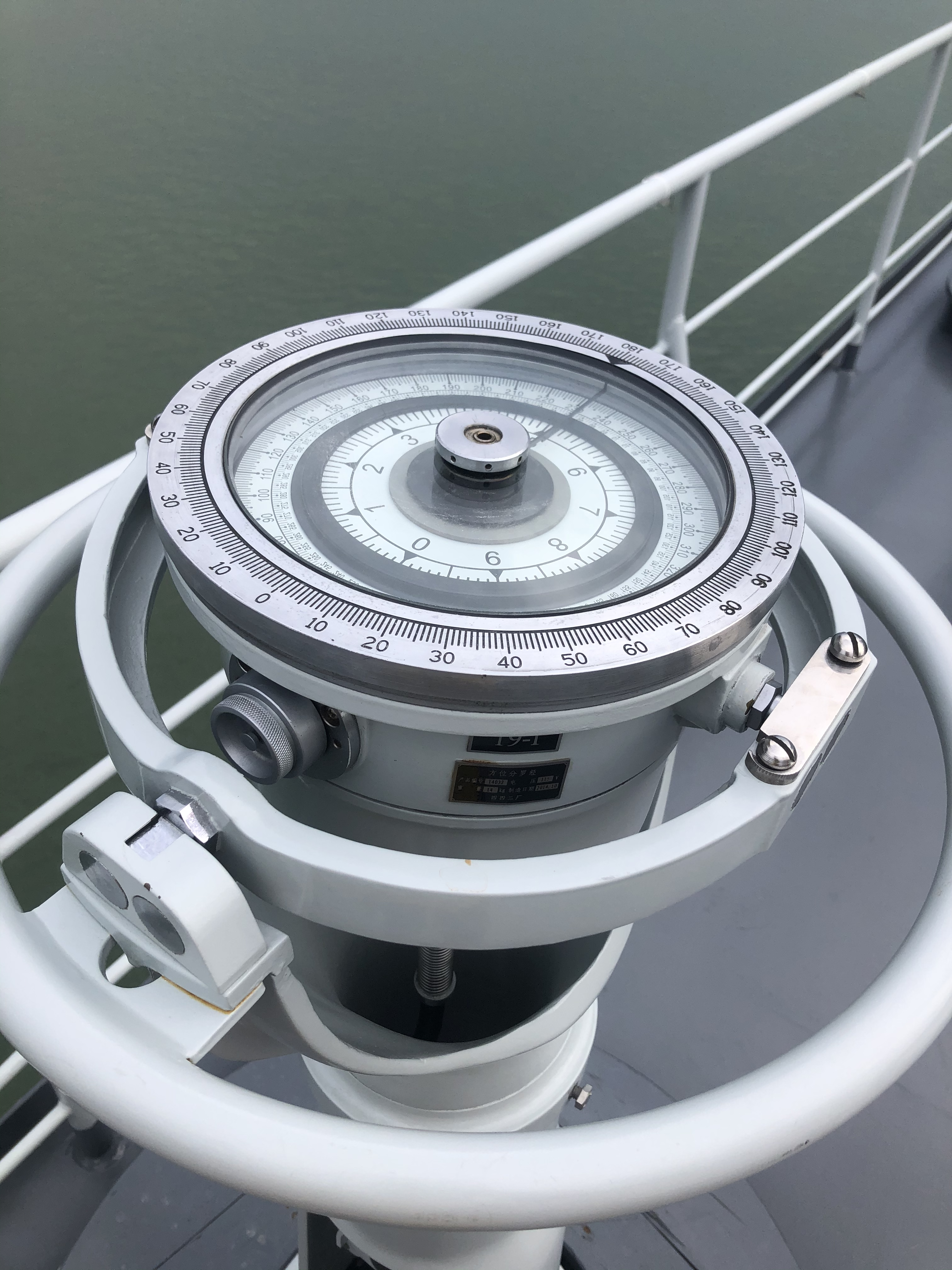
Qi Jiguang’s navigational ship compass.

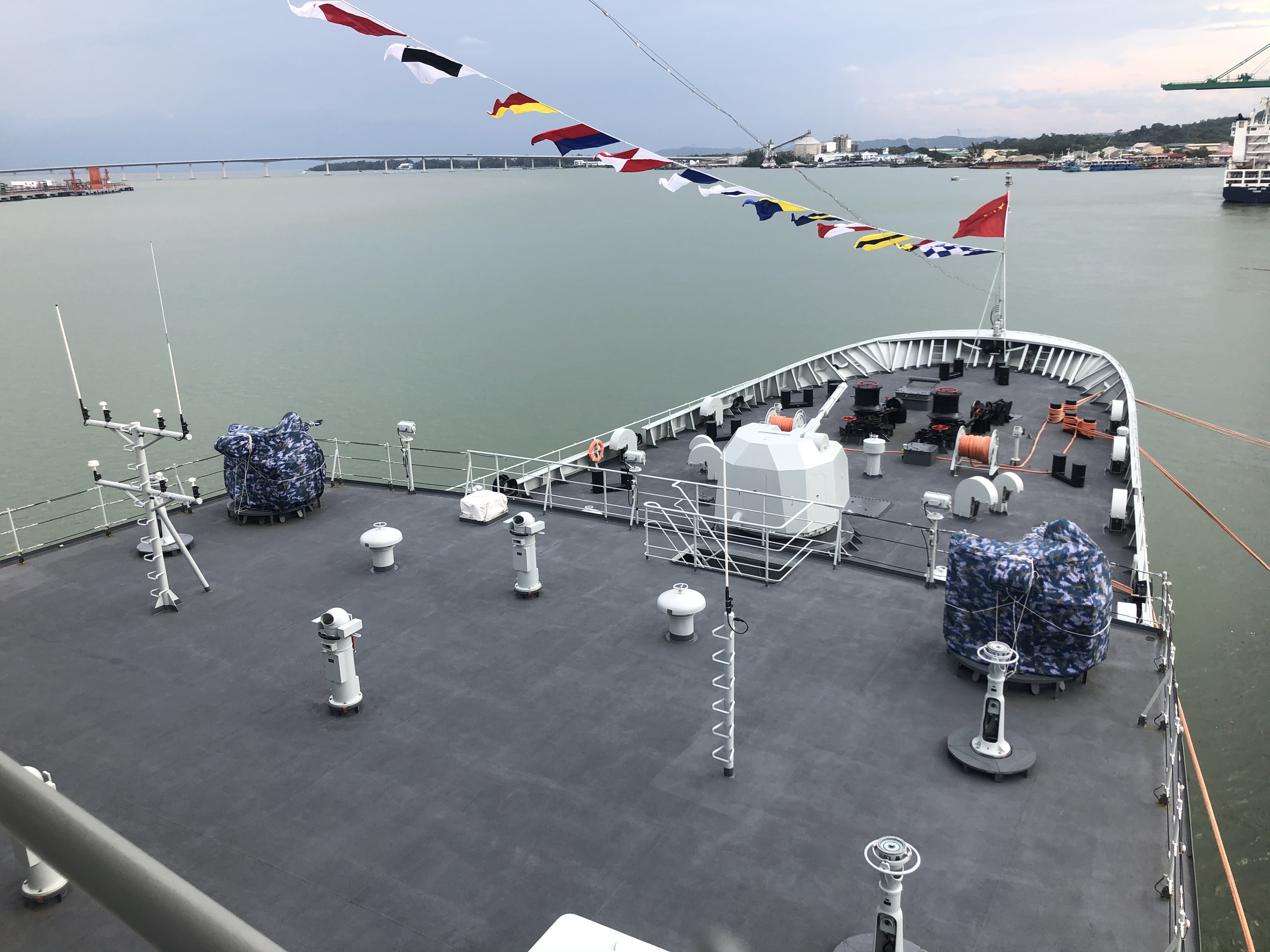
Qi Jiguang’s forward bow view of all her main armaments.

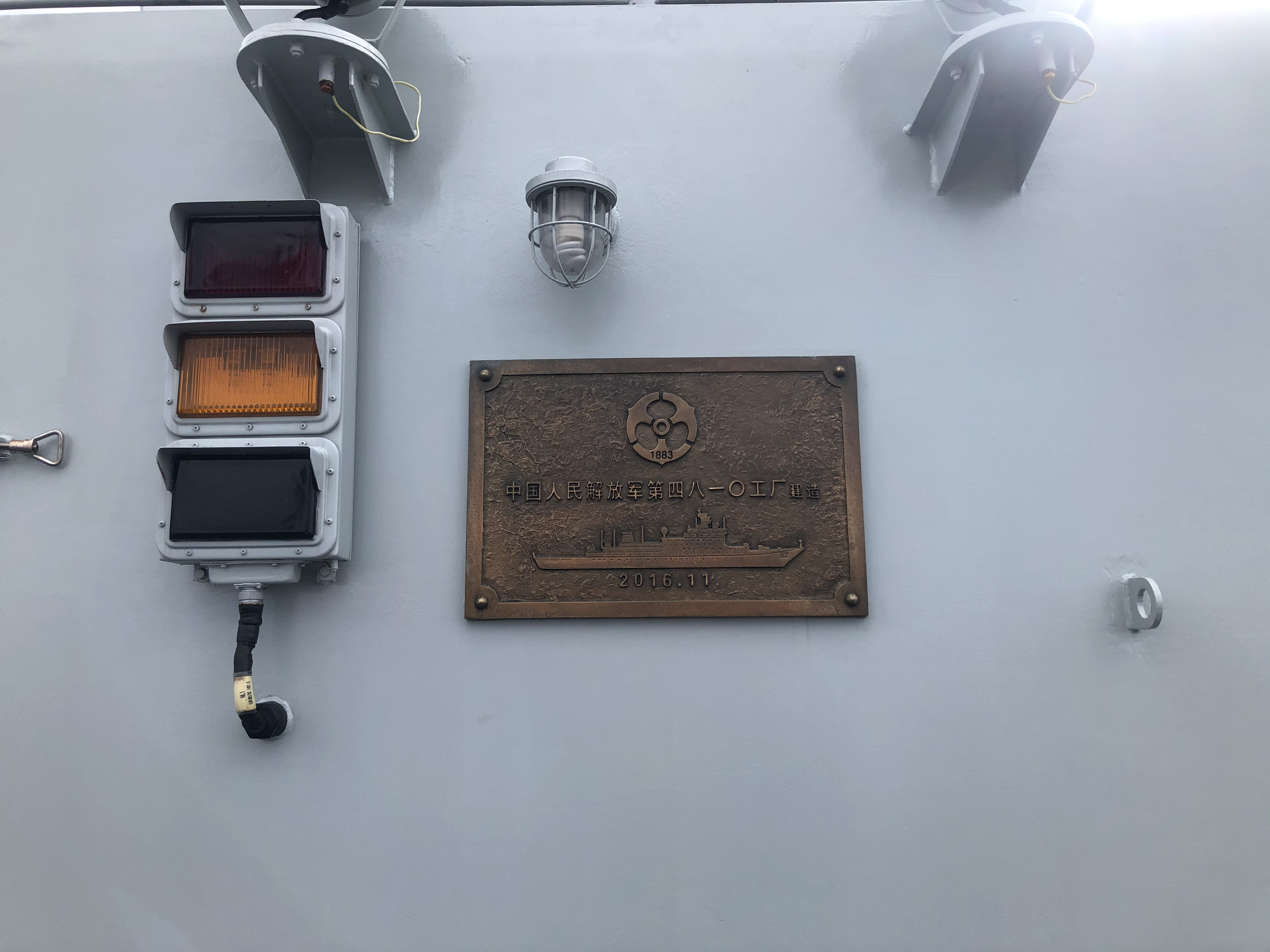
Qi Jiguang builder's plaque.

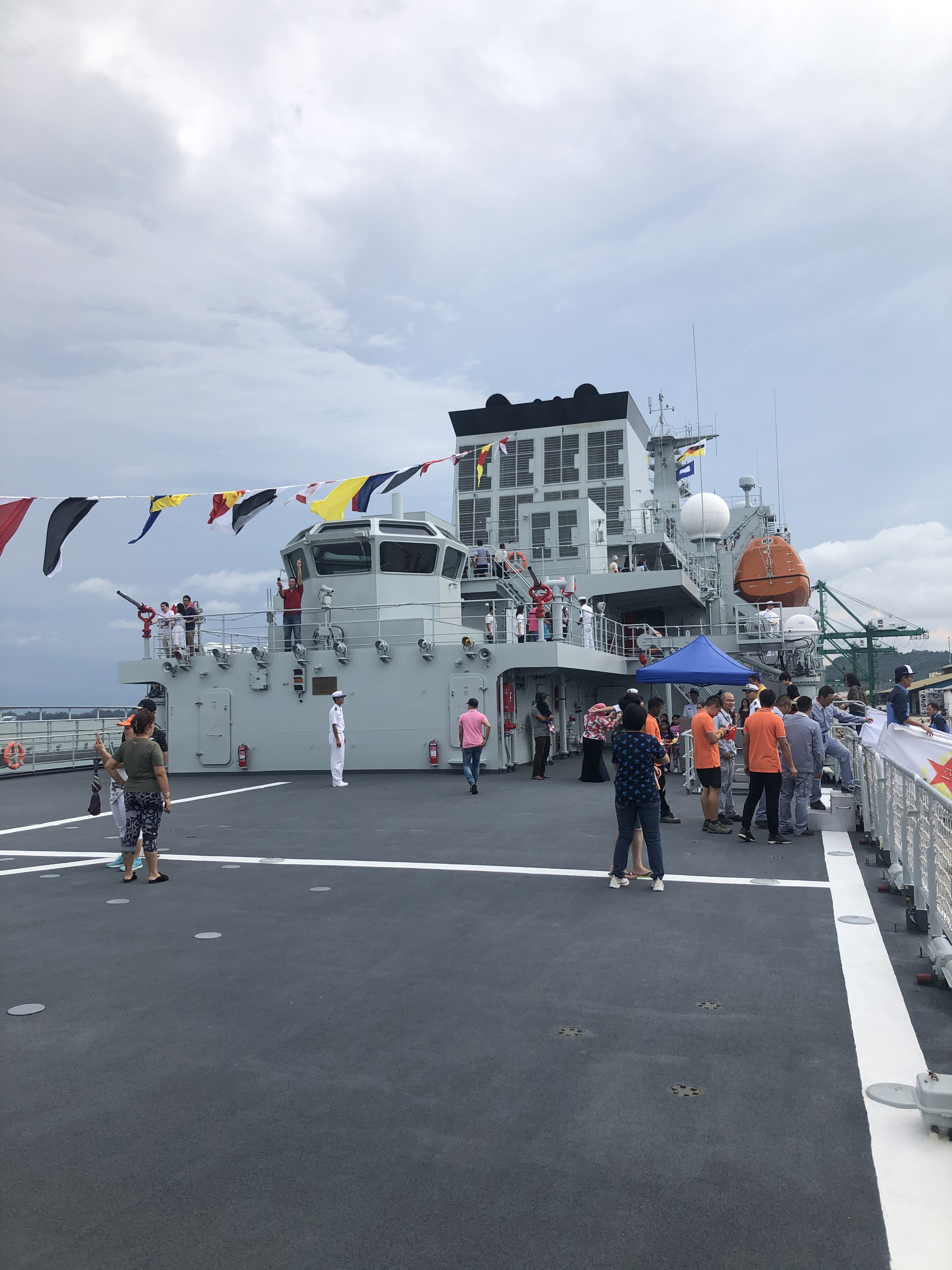
Qi Jiguang’s aft view towards midship.

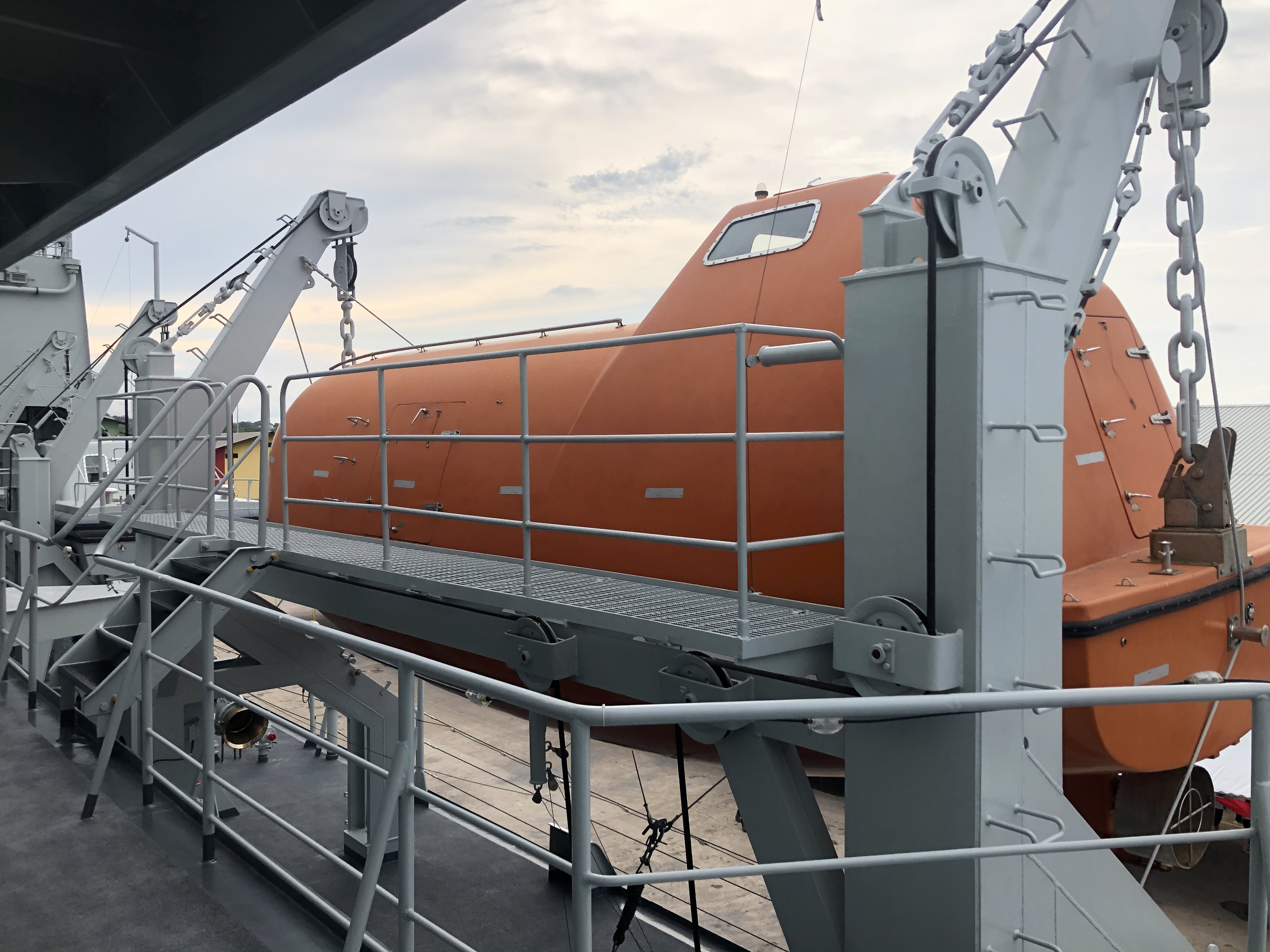
Qi Jiguang’s life boat.

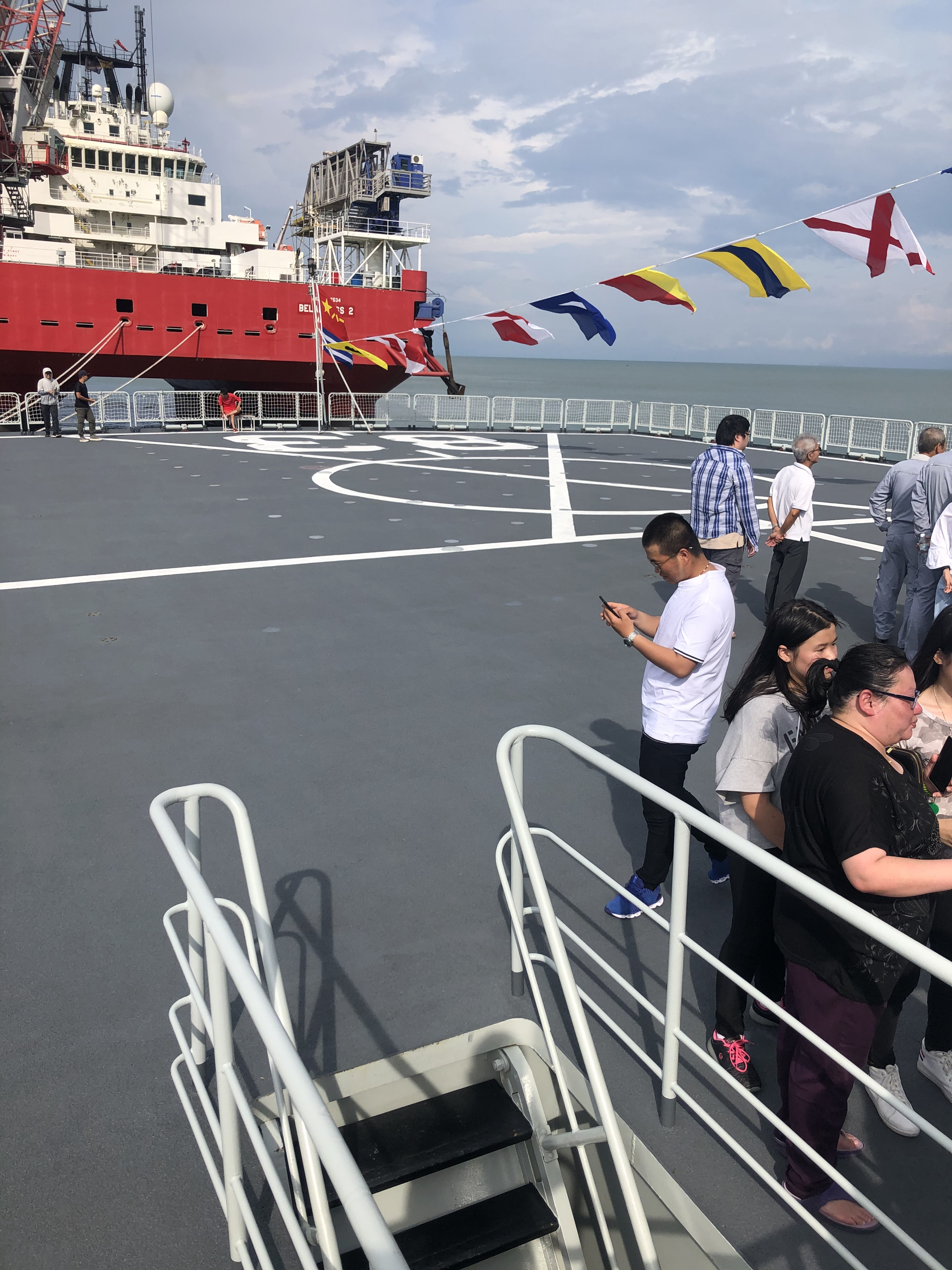
Qi Jiguang’s helipad.

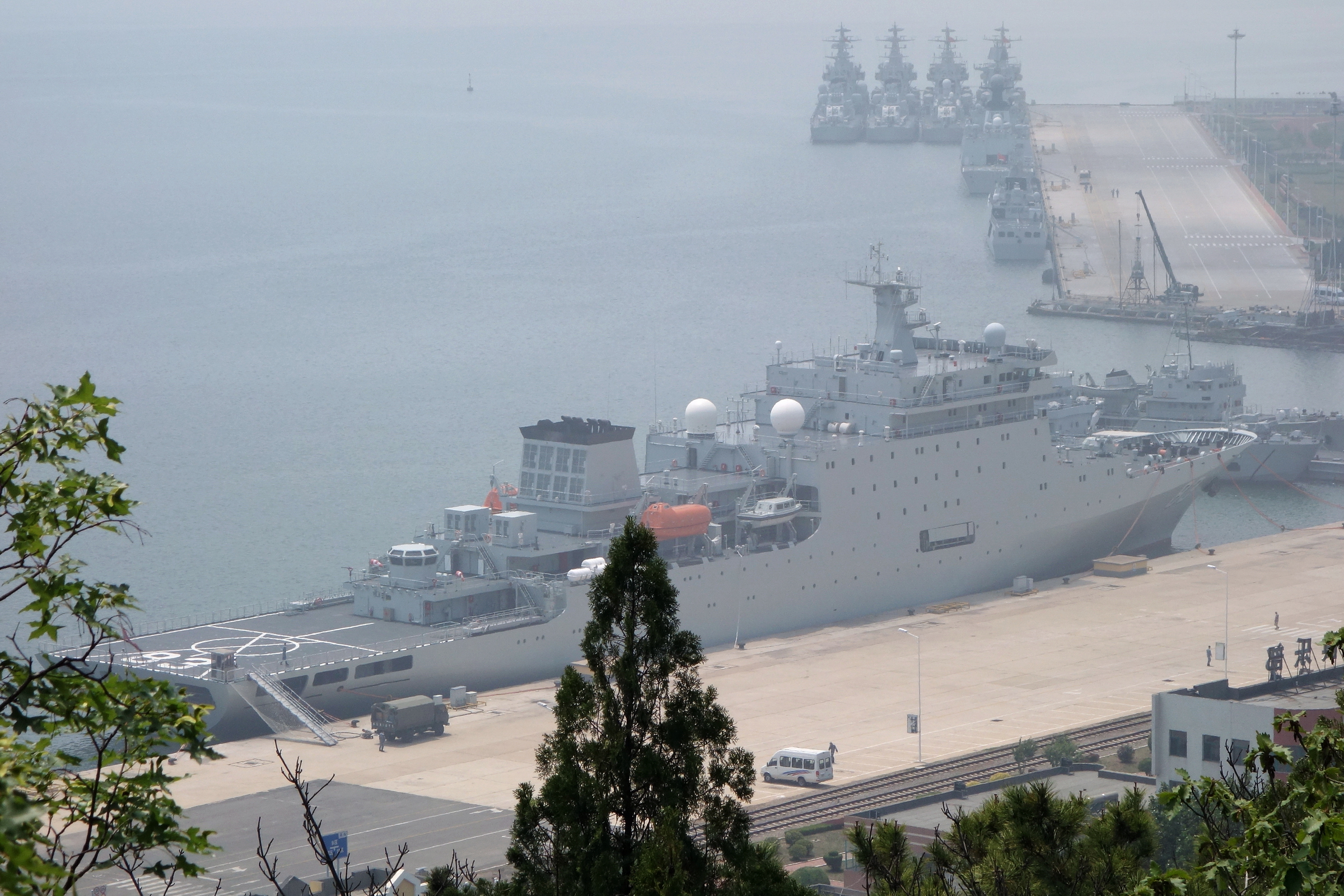
Qi Jiguang at anchor, 21 June 2019

== See also ==
- ROCS Chi Kuang, ROCN navy ship with the same namesake
