= Chinese landing ship Jinggang Shan =

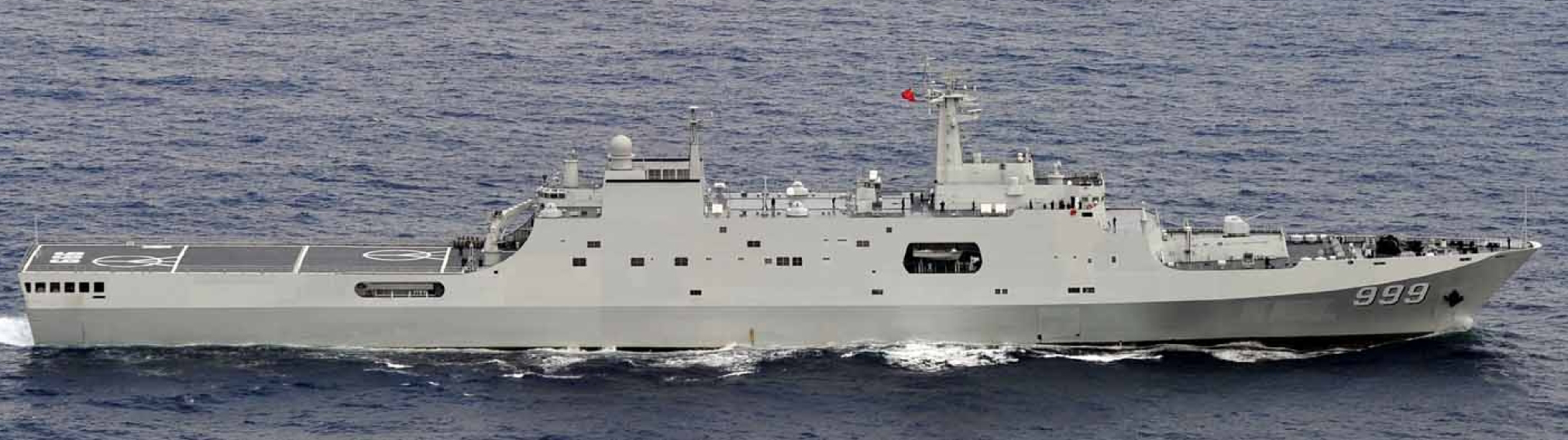
- Jinggang Shan underway on 31 March 2013

History

China
- Name: Jinggang Shan (999)(Chinese: 井冈山)
- Namesake: Jinggang Mountains
- Operator: People's Liberation Army Navy
- Ordered: ?
- Builder: Hudong-Zhonghua shipyard
- Launched: 16 November 2010
- Home port: South Sea Fleet

General characteristics
- Class & type: Type 071 amphibious transport dock
- Displacement: 25,000 tons
- Length: 210 meters
- Beam: 28 meters
- Draught: 7 m (21 ft)
- Propulsion: CODAD; 4 × SEMT Pielstick 16 PC2.6 V400 diesel engines, 472,000 hp (351,970 kW); 2 × shafts
- Speed: 25 knots (46 km/h) max
- Range: 10,000 nmi (19,000 km) at 18 knots (33 km/h; 21 mph)
- Boats & landing craft carried: 4 × air-cushioned landing craft; 2 × landing craft on port/starboard davits
- Capacity: 15-20 armoured vehicles
- Troops: 500-800 troops
- Crew: 120
- Sensors & processing systems: 1 × Type 360 Radar Seagull S, E/F-band surface search radar; 1 × Type 364 Radar, Seagull C, G-band air search radar aft; 1 × Type 344 Radar, I band fire control radar; 1 × navigational radar
- Electronic warfare & decoys: UAT Electronic Support Measures
- Armament: 1 × AK-176 76 mm (3.0 in) gun; 4 × AK-630 30 mm (1.2 in) CIWS; 4 × 18-tube Type 726-4 decoy/chaff launcher; Possible installation of 2-4 heavy machine guns (Fitted for but not with)
- Aircraft carried: 2-4 Z-8 Super Frelon

Jinggang Shan (999) is a ship of China's Type 071 amphibious transport dock Yuzhao class. The ship was launched on 16 November 2010. After finishing trials the ship was commissioned to the South Sea Fleet. Its estimated production cost is US$300 million.

== History ==
On 9 March 2014, the ship was deployed in the search for the missing Malaysia Airlines Flight 370.

=== 2024 stopover in Penang ===
In October 2024, Jinggang Shan and the Type 680 training ship docked at Swettenham Pier in George Town, the capital city of the Malaysian state of Penang. During the stopover, the crew paid a courtesy call on the speaker of the Penang legislature Law Choo Kiang and toured the Penang State Assembly Building. Some of the crew also visited the Chung Ling Private High School, where they received a "friendly" reception to mark the 50th anniversary of China's diplomatic ties with Malaysia. After the visit, the two ships proceeded to Chittagong, Bangladesh.

The stopover led to criticism from Malaysia's right-wing Islamist opposition, led by the Malaysian Islamic Party (PAS), which accused the Anwar Ibrahim administration of compromising Malaysia's national sovereignty. The school lodged a police report against malicious social media content, while Penang state executive councillor Wong Hon Wai clarified that the crew who visited the school were tertiary students and not navy personnel. Some analysts have suggested that PAS intended to exploit the stopover to stir racial tensions and intimidate the country's Chinese minority by insinuating that China was collaborating with the Chinese community in Penang, the only Malaysian state continuously governed by ethnic Chinese since independence.
