= Penangite Chinese =

Ethnic group in Malaysia

槟城华人 / 檳城華人 (Chinese); Kaum Cina Pulau Pinang (Malay)
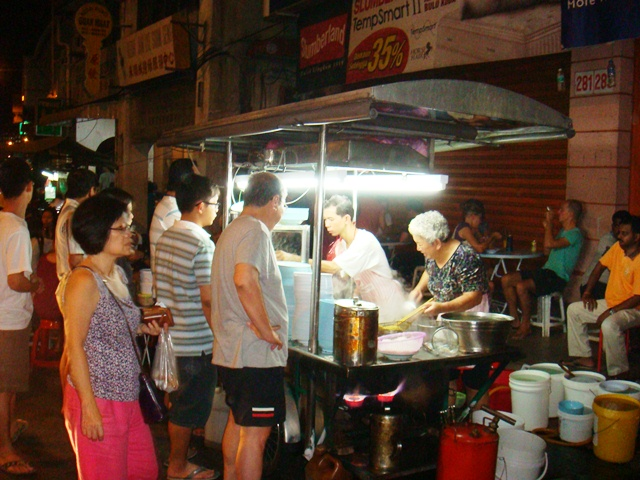
- A Chinese wantan mee hawker stall in George Town.

Total population
- 718,362; 41.3% of Penang's population in 2020 (census)

Regions with significant populations
- Penang; George Town: City centre, Balik Pulau, Ayer Itam, Tanjong Bungah, Jelutong, Paya Terubong, Tanjong Tokong; Seberang Perai: Bukit Mertajam, Nibong Tebal, Butterworth, Simpang Ampat

Languages
- Penang Hokkien and Malaysian Mandarin (lingua franca); Malaysian, Kedah Malay, English, Manglish; Other dialects: Cantonese, Teochew, Hakka

Religion
- Predominantly Buddhism and/or Taoism, with a significant number of Christians.; Minority: Islam, Atheism

Related ethnic groups
- Chinese diaspora, Peranakan, Chindian

Penangite Chinese are ethnic Chinese Malaysians of full or partial Chinese ancestry who either hail from or live within the State of Penang. As of 2020, 45% of Penang's population belonged to the Chinese ethnic group, making ethnic Chinese the largest ethnic community within the state.

Most Chinese Penangites are the descendants of Chinese traders, accountants, merchants, labourers and immigrants from southern China who moved to the Penang between the 18th and 20th centuries. By the mid-19th century, George Town, the capital city of Penang, was home to a significant Peranakan community, also known as the King's Chinese due to their loyalty to the British crown. Under British colonial rule, Penang continued to experience increasing Chinese immigration throughout the 19th century. As the largest group of Penangite Chinese are ethnic Hokkiens (38% of the Chinese penangite population in 1957) who came from southern Fujian Province, home to the Hokkien language, Penang Hokkien was gradually developed and is now widely used by Penangites for daily communication.

Penang's Chinese have been well-represented within Malaysia and also internationally in various professional, political, economic and other fields. To date, Penang is the only state in Malaysia where the position of the Chief Minister, who leads the state government, has been continuously held by an ethnic Chinese since independence. Renowned figures, including Jimmy Choo and Nicol David, hailed from Penang and have contributed greatly in raising the country's profile internationally.

Penangite Chinese typically refer to themselves as Tn̂g-lâng in Penang Hokkien. In English parlance within Penang, Penangite Chinese are simply referred to as "Chinese".

== History ==
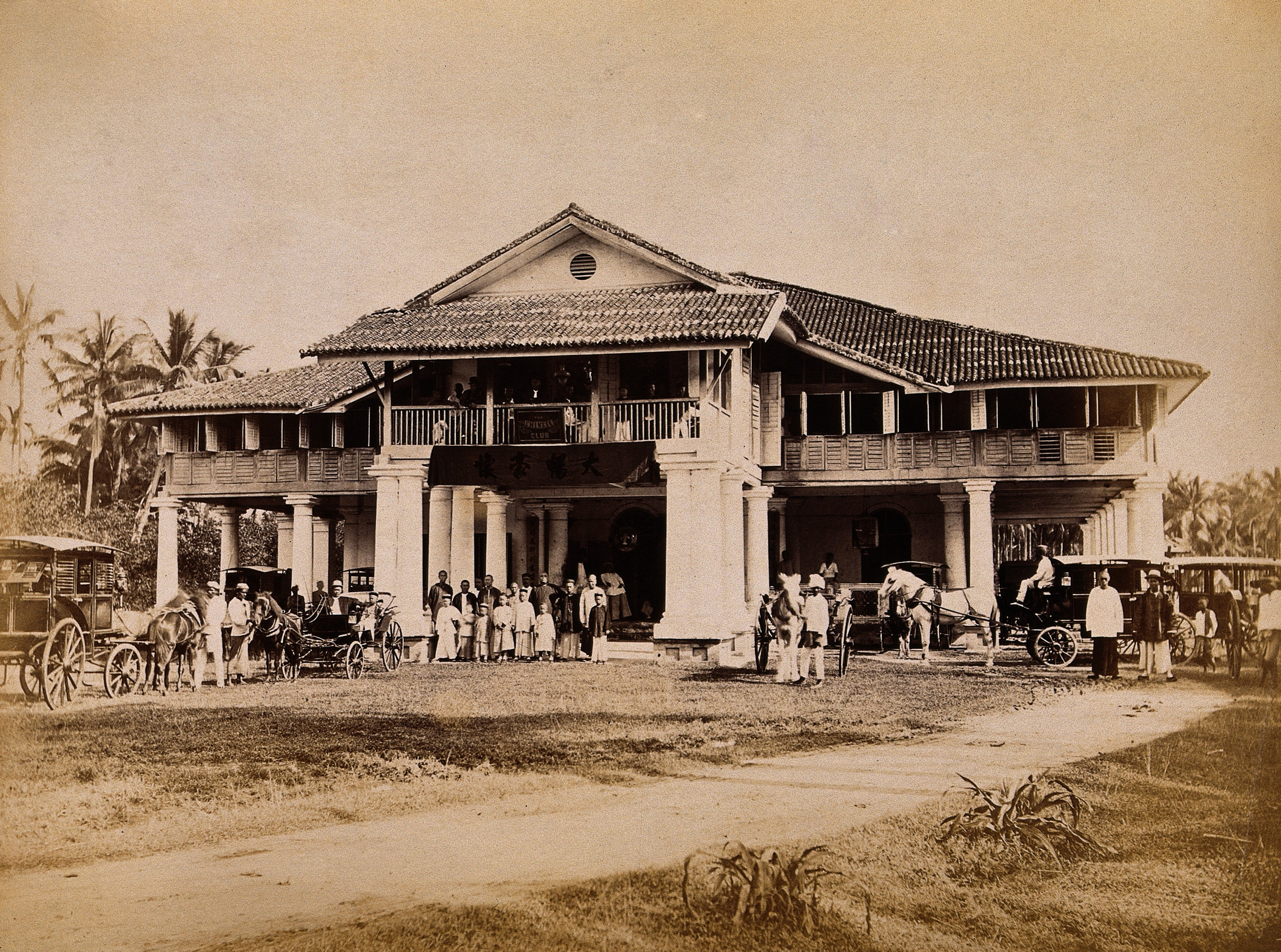
Chinese merchants and carriages outside their club house on Penang Island, 1881.

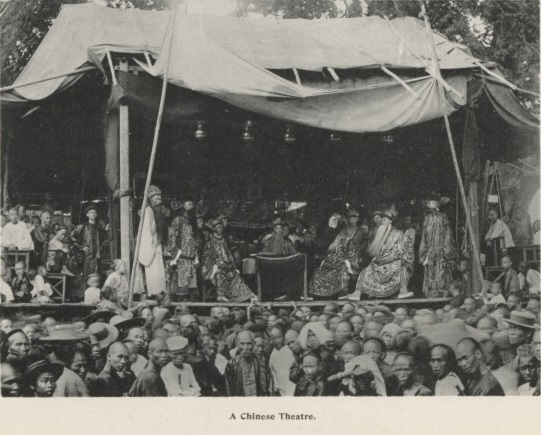
A Chinese theater in Penang in 1897.

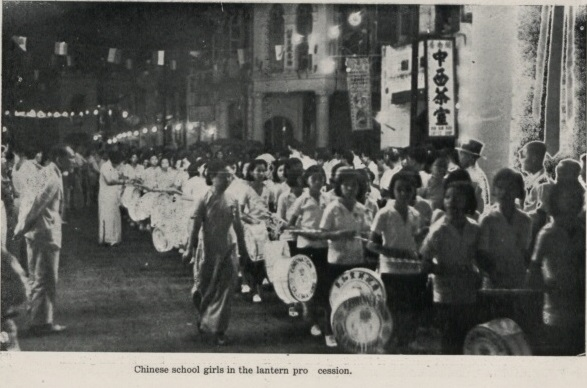
Chinese school girls in a lantern procession in Penang in 1937.

Chinese sailors had explored the seas off Penang Island as early as the 15th century. During the Ming Dynasty, Chinese seafarers led by Admiral Zheng He sailed the length of the Malacca Straits; Penang Island may have appeared in the Nautical Charts of Zheng He.

However, it was only sometime in the 18th century when the Chinese began to arrive on Penang Island. It was recorded that the fishing village of Tanjung Tokong on the northern coast of the island was founded by Zhang Li, a sailor whose arrival on Penang Island preceded that of Captain Francis Light by at least a few decades.

After the British East India Company under Captain Francis Light founded George Town in 1786, ethnic Chinese began to move to Penang in increasing numbers. In particular, the Peranakans, who already had established themselves along the western coast of the Malay Peninsula, shifted to Penang. This, coupled with the greater number of newer immigrants from China throughout the 19th century, effectively made the Chinese the largest ethnic group in Penang by the 1850s.

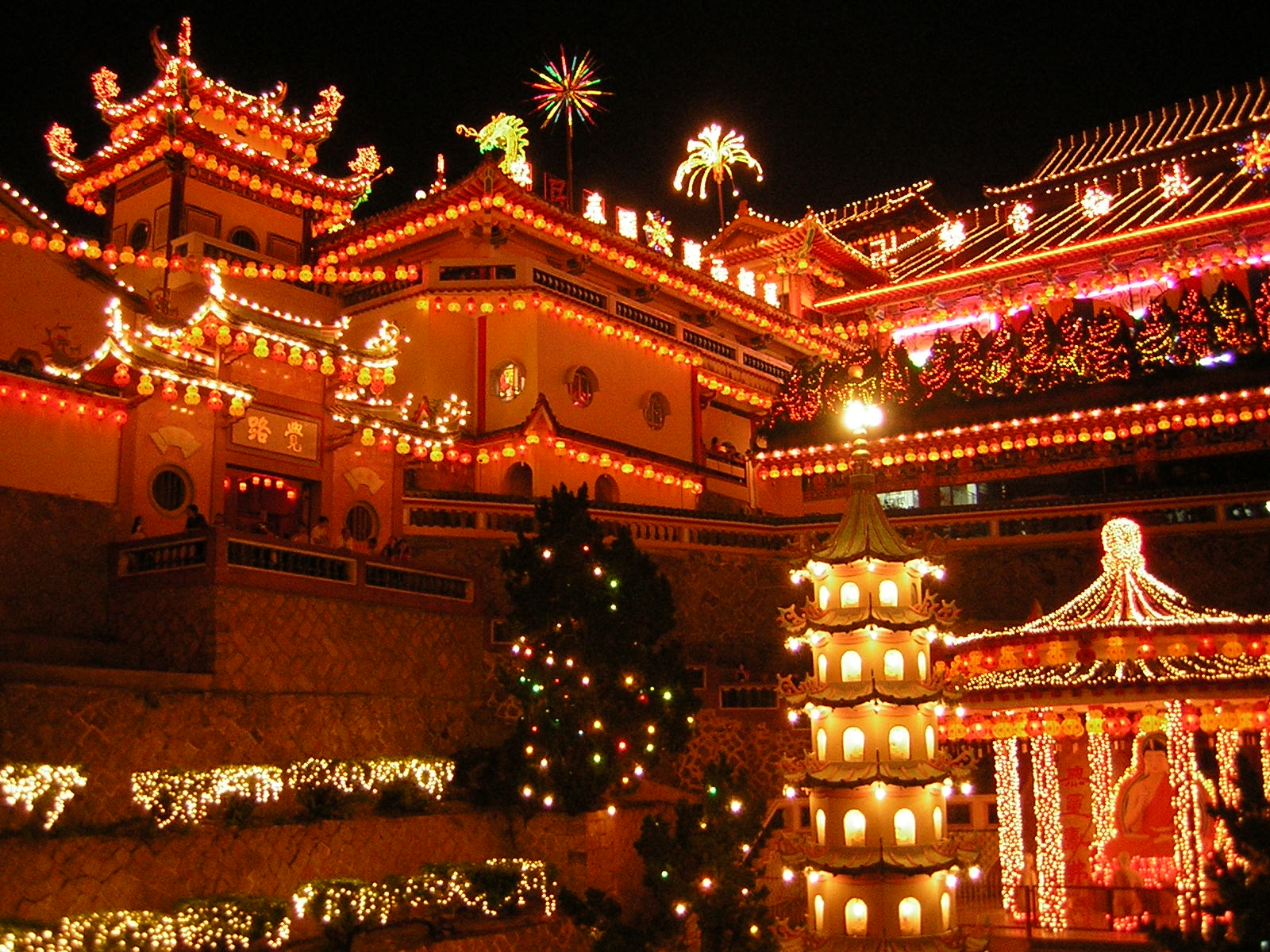
Chinese New Year decorations at Kek Lok Si Temple, Penang.

As Penang grew into a major entrepôt towards the end of the 19th century, the influx of various cultures and religions would create a melting pot where the multi-ethnic and multi-religious society could exist in harmony. Similarly, over time, the newer Chinese arrivals became acculturated to the existing local culture and customs due to intermarriages between the Peranakans and the "Sinkeh". At the turn of the century, the Chinese nationalist Sun Yat-sen's campaigns to liberate China from imperial Manchu rule attracted considerable financial support from Penang's Chinese population.

During World War II, ethnic Chinese in Penang suffered brutal and often violent treatment in the hands of the occupying Imperial Japanese Army. The Japanese implemented a policy known as Sook Ching, a systematic purge of perceived hostile elements, including the Chinese. Hundreds of ethnic Chinese as well as 3,500 other non-Chinese POWs were massacred and buried in unmarked mass graves throughout Penang during the Japanese occupation period.

== Demographics ==
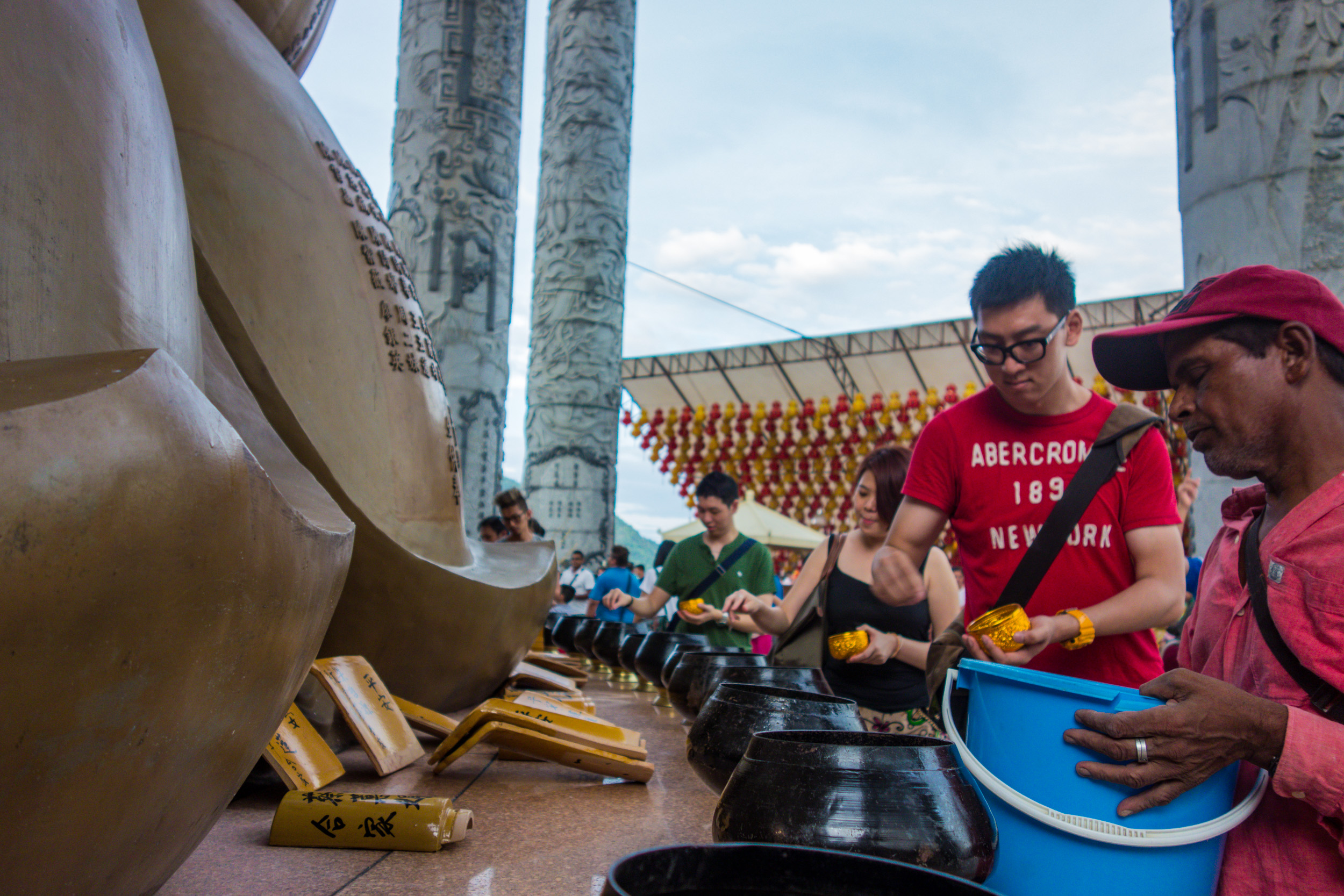
Chinese devotees at Kek Lok Si Temple.

Out of the nearly 720,000 Penangite Chinese, most are concentrated on Penang Island, particularly within and around the city of George Town.

Ethnic Chinese constitute the plurality of Penang Island's population; the 2020 Malaysian Census indicated that about 56% of Penang Island's inhabitants were of Chinese descent. On the island, more Chinese reside within the Northeastern District, where George Town is situated, compared to the less-populated Southwestern District.

The Chinese also accounted for 35.7% of the population in Seberang Perai, the mainland halve of the State of Penang. They most commonly reside within the Central and Southern districts, forming a visible majority in the towns within these districts, such as Bukit Mertajam, Batu Kawan and Nibong Tebal.

Percentages of Chinese populations in Penang Island and Seberang Perai
Area	Percentage (%)	Largest concentrations
Penang Island	56.0	Northeast Penang Island District (George Town)
Seberang Perai	35.7	Central Seberang Perai District (Bukit Mertajam)
Seberang Perai	35.7	South Seberang Perai District (Nibong Tebal, Batu Kawan)

=== Language ===
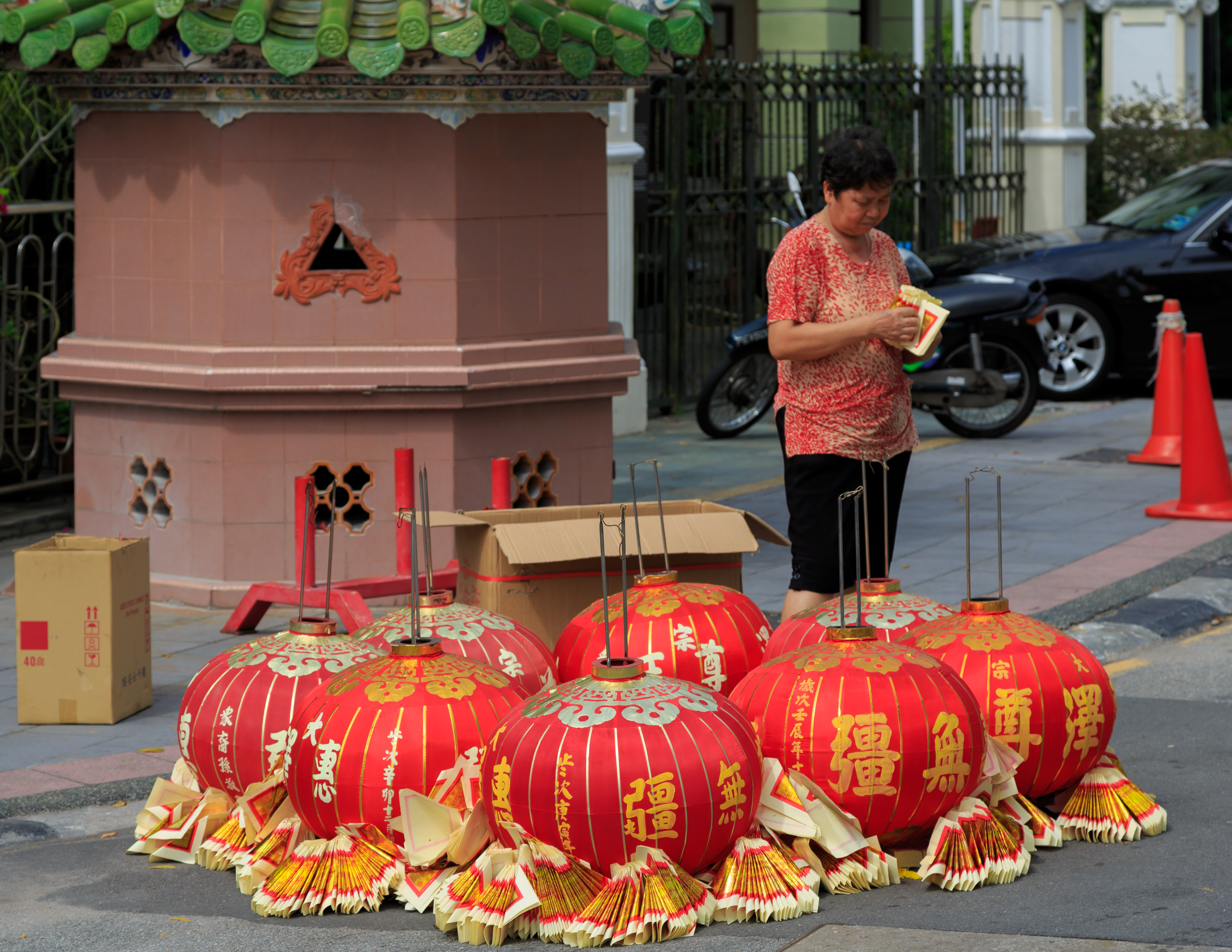
A Chinese businesswoman checking her delivery of Chinese lanterns in George Town.

According to the 2010 Malaysian Census, up to 63.9% of Penang's Sinitic population spoke Hokkien as their mother tongue. This figure likely included those with Peranakan ancestry. The second largest Sinitic linguistic group in Penang was the Teochews, constituting 17.8% of Penang's Sinitic community, followed by the Cantonese at 8.3%. There were also smaller Hakka and Hainanese communities throughout Penang.

Language group	Percentage (%)
Hokkien	63.9
Teochew	17.8
Cantonese	8.3
Hakka	5.2
Hainanese	1.5
Others	3.2
Total	100.0

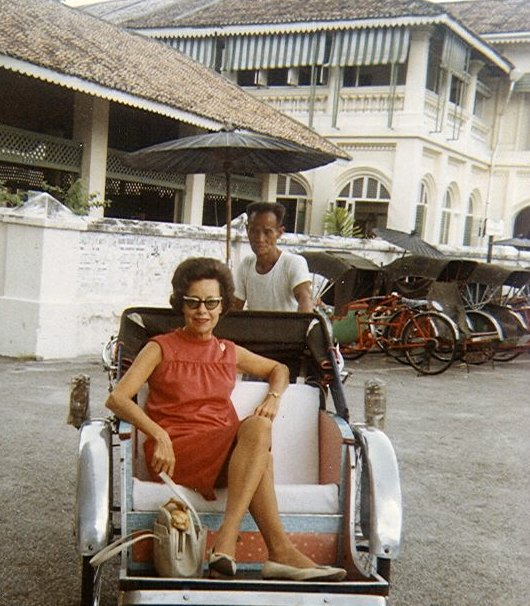
A Chinese trishaw rider with an American passenger in George Town in 1967.

The resulting ubiquitous use of Hokkien has made Penang Hokkien the lingua franca among Penangites. Penang Hokkien, which originated from a subdialect of Zhangzhou Hokkien, incorporated several Malay and English terms over the centuries, eventually evolving into a distinct Hokkien dialect used mainly in northern Malaysia. Uniquely for Penang, this localised Hokkien creole is spoken by many Penangites regardless of race for daily communication, so much so that even local police officers also take courses in Penang Hokkien. More recently, Penang Hokkien has also been popularised in mass media, particularly through books, dictionaries and movies, due in part to the desire to maintain the language's relevance in the face of increasing influence of Mandarin and English amongst the younger generations. Just like in other states, younger sinitic generation in Penang mostly speaks Mandarin with family and friends now.

Besides Penang Hokkien and Mandarin, the latter of which has been used as a medium of instruction in Chinese primary schools in Penang, Cantonese, Teochew and Hakka are spoken by smaller numbers of Chinese as well. In general, these communities arrived in Penang after the Hokkiens had already established themselves within the colony in the early 19th century. The Cantonese and Hakka communities, in particular, would go on to predominate parts of George Town towards the end of the 19th century, while a significant number of Teochews were also employed in the agricultural industries within the then Province Wellesley (now Seberang Perai). To this day, many of the Teochews continue to reside in the towns of Seberang Perai, such as Bukit Mertajam, Sungai Bakap and Nibong Tebal.

In addition, all Penangites are conversant with Malay, the national language of Malaysia, as the language is made compulsory in all schools in Penang. A legacy of British rule is the existence of several English and missionary schools throughout Penang, which also contributes to the relatively high level of English proficiency among Penangites.

== Culture ==
=== Cuisine ===
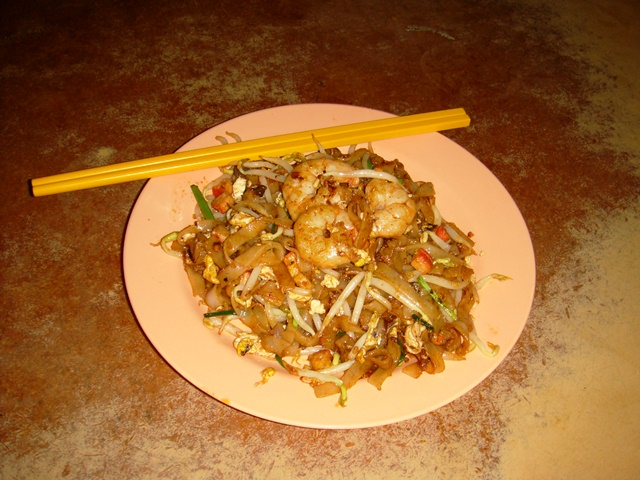
A plate of Penang char kway teow. The dish, one of the more popular street dishes in the state, is available in most hawker stalls all over Penang.

Along with other races, the Chinese have greatly influenced Penang's street cuisine, one of the more famous culinary styles in Southeast Asia. Penang is famous for its variants of Chinese dishes, including char kuey teow, Hokkien mee and chee cheong fun. These are in addition to the famous asam laksa, a local variant of the Peranakan fusion dish, which was ranked 7th in CNN's list of the world's 50 best dishes.

=== Festivals ===
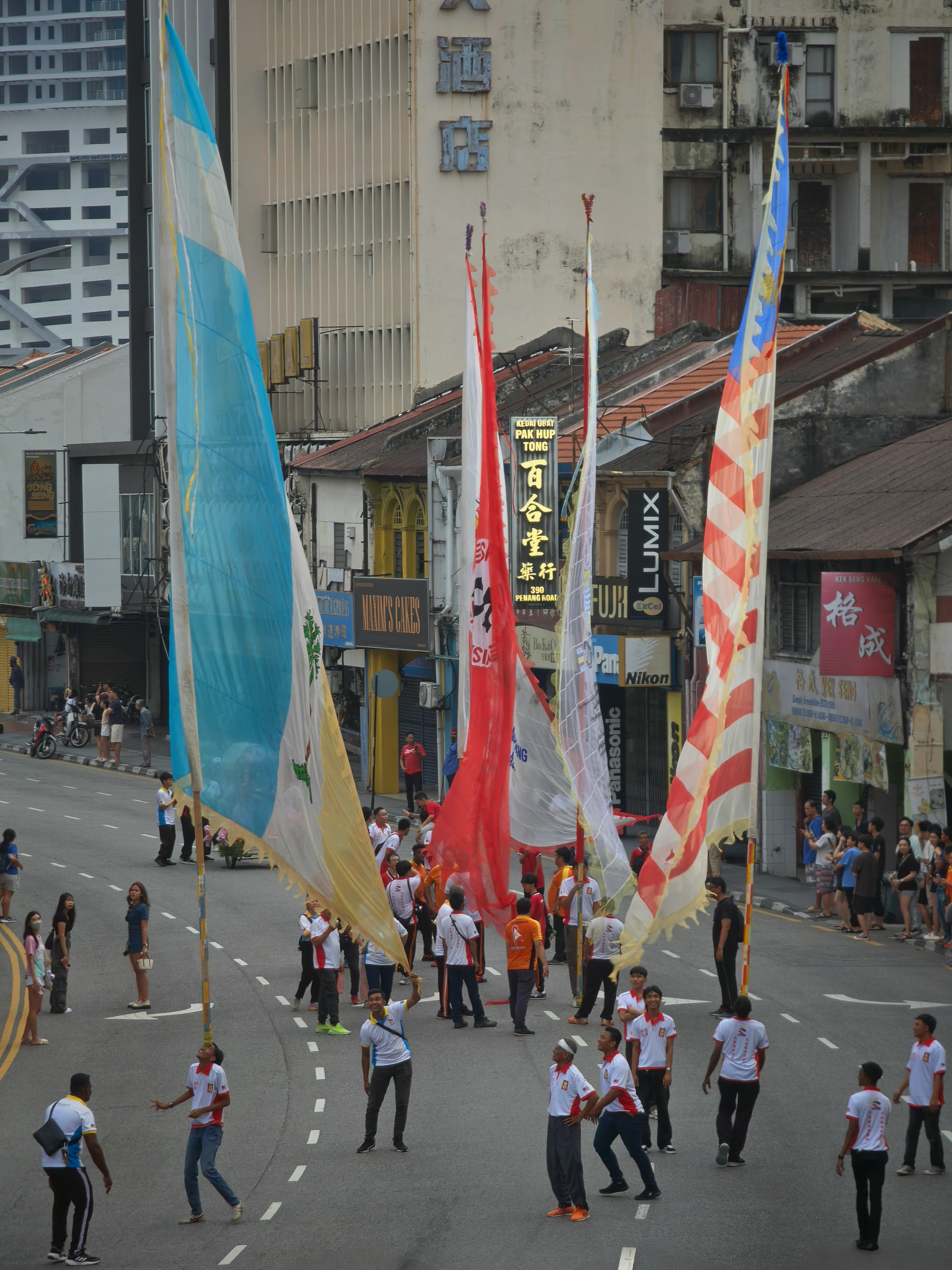
A Chingay procession in George Town

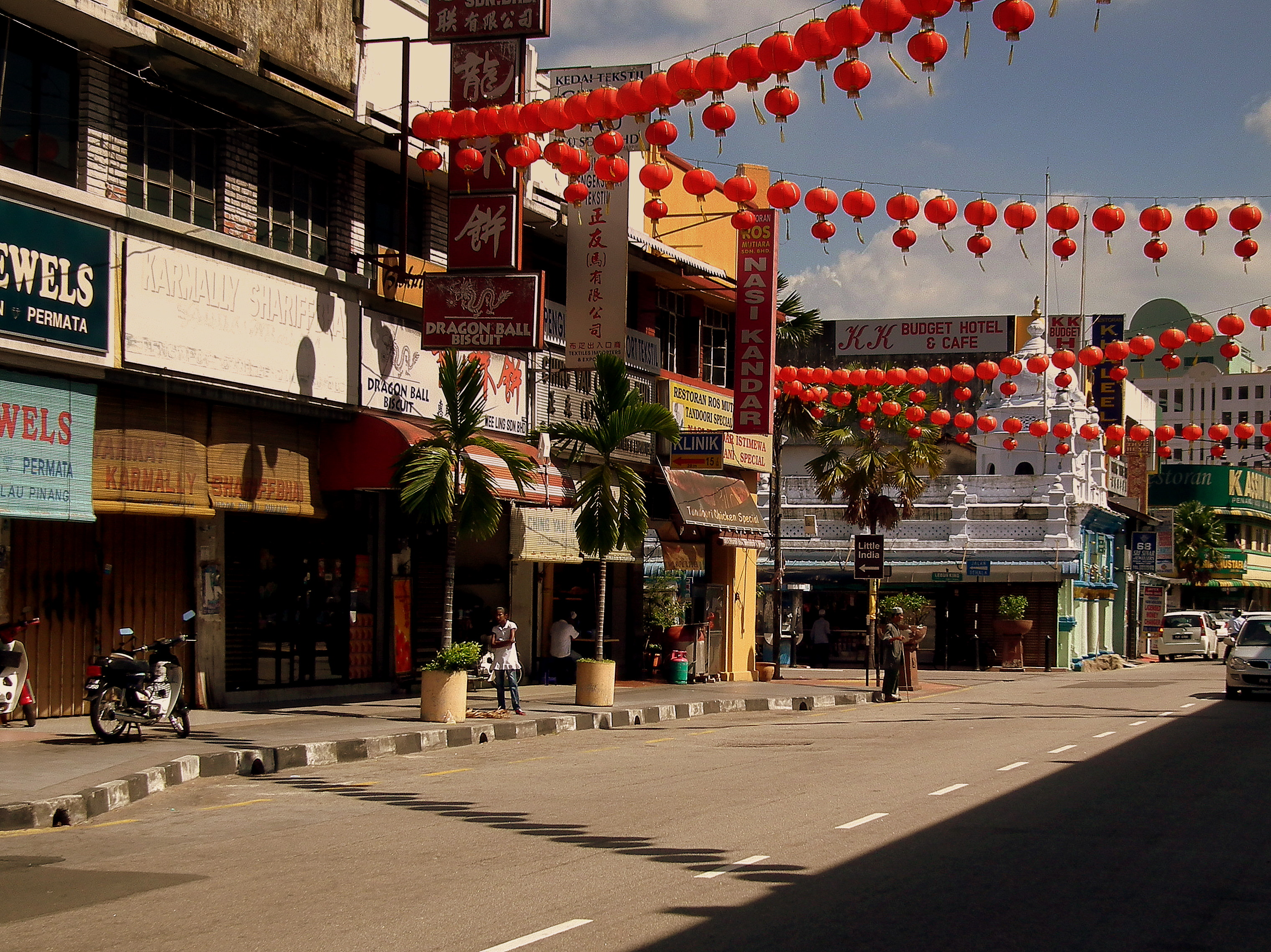
Chinese lanterns in Little India, George Town, ushering in the Chinese New Year.

Some of the major Chinese cultural celebrations in Penang include the Chinese New Year, Lantern Festival, Zhong Yuan Festival and Mid-Autumn Festival.

The largest of all is the Chinese New Year, which includes a number of festivities and observances which are unique to Penang. For instance, the Jade Emperor's Birthday, also known colloquially as the "Hokkien New Year", falls on the 9th day of Chinese New Year and is widely observed in Penang. Chinese New Year festivities in Penang also include the traditional lighting up of the iconic Kek Lok Si Temple, a 'fire watching' ceremony in the Snake Temple and open houses by several ornate Chinese clan houses within George Town's UNESCO World Heritage Site.

Wesak Day is celebrated by the Buddhists with a grand procession by Buddhist associations and temples based in Penang since 1949, with floats depicting both Mahayana and Theravada traditions. Most Buddhists and Taoists observe Qing Ming and the Zhong Yuan Festival, both to honour their departed relatives and friends. Taoists also celebrate various Taoist Deities's birthday like Guan Gong's Birthday and Nine Emperor Gods Festival at various temples in Penang. The Christians, meanwhile, observe Christmas and Easter, with the Catholics also observing the Saint Anne's Novena for 10 days at the St. Anne's Church in Bukit Mertajam.

=== Chingay performance ===
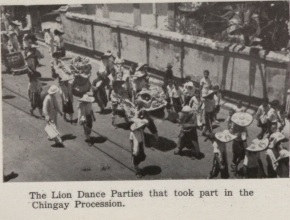
Lion dance troupes during a Chingay procession in Penang in 1937.

Chingay parades were said to have originated in Penang in the early 20th century, before spreading to the rest of Peninsular Malaysia and Singapore. The Penang variant of the Chingay parade includes a giant flag balancing act on one's forehead.

Since the 1950s, an annual Chingay parade has been held within the city of George Town every December, in a bid to retain this unique cultural practice.

== Landmarks ==
Traditional Chinese architecture in Penang

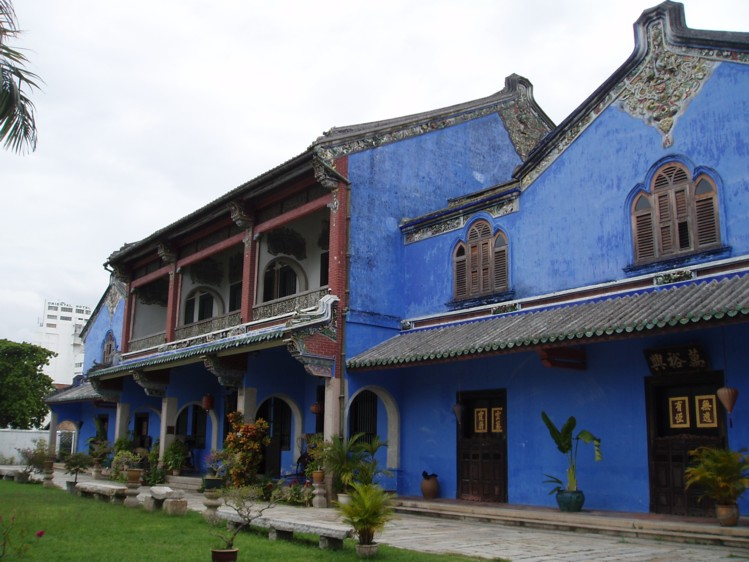
Cheong Fatt Tze Mansion, George Town

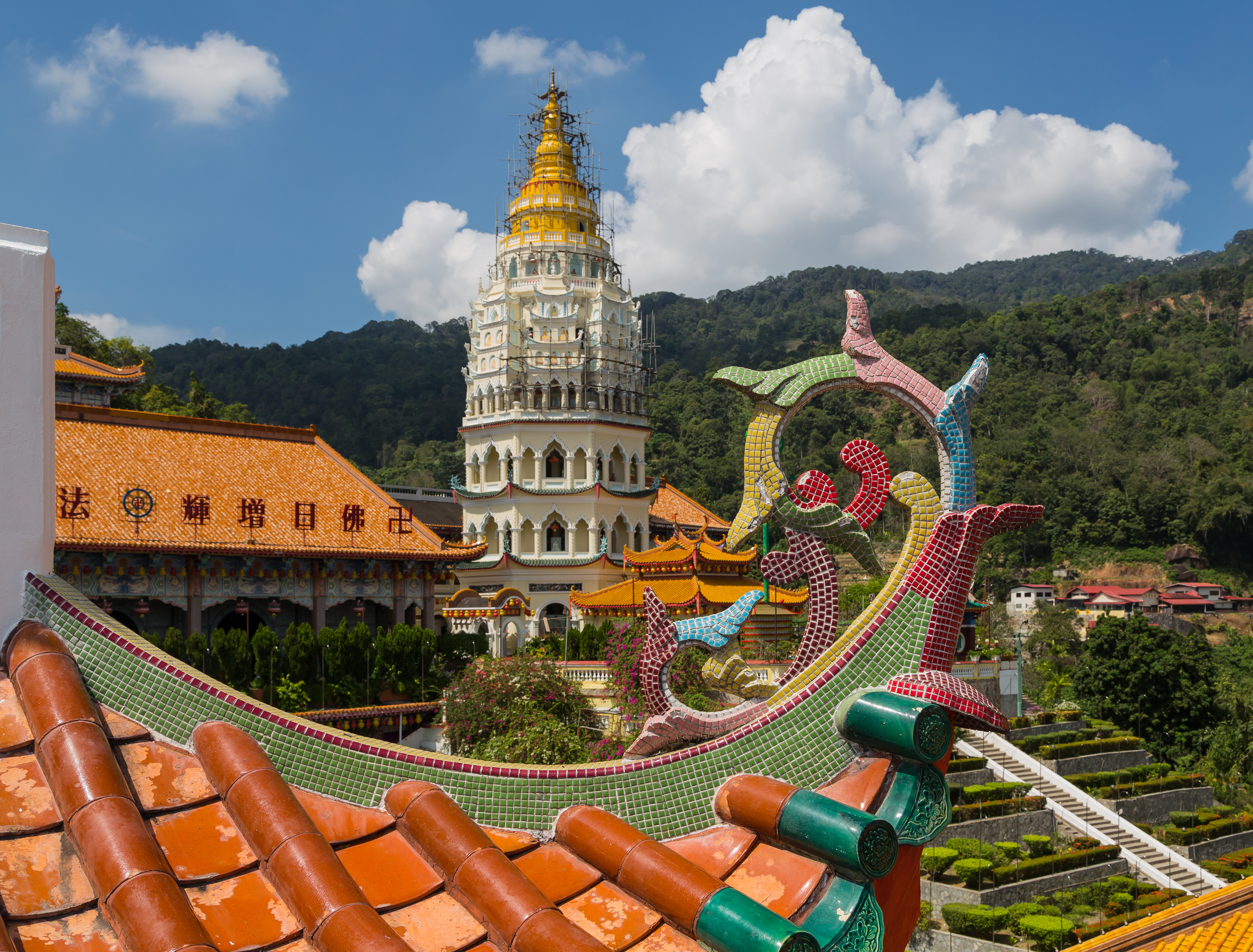
Kek Lok Si Temple, Air Itam

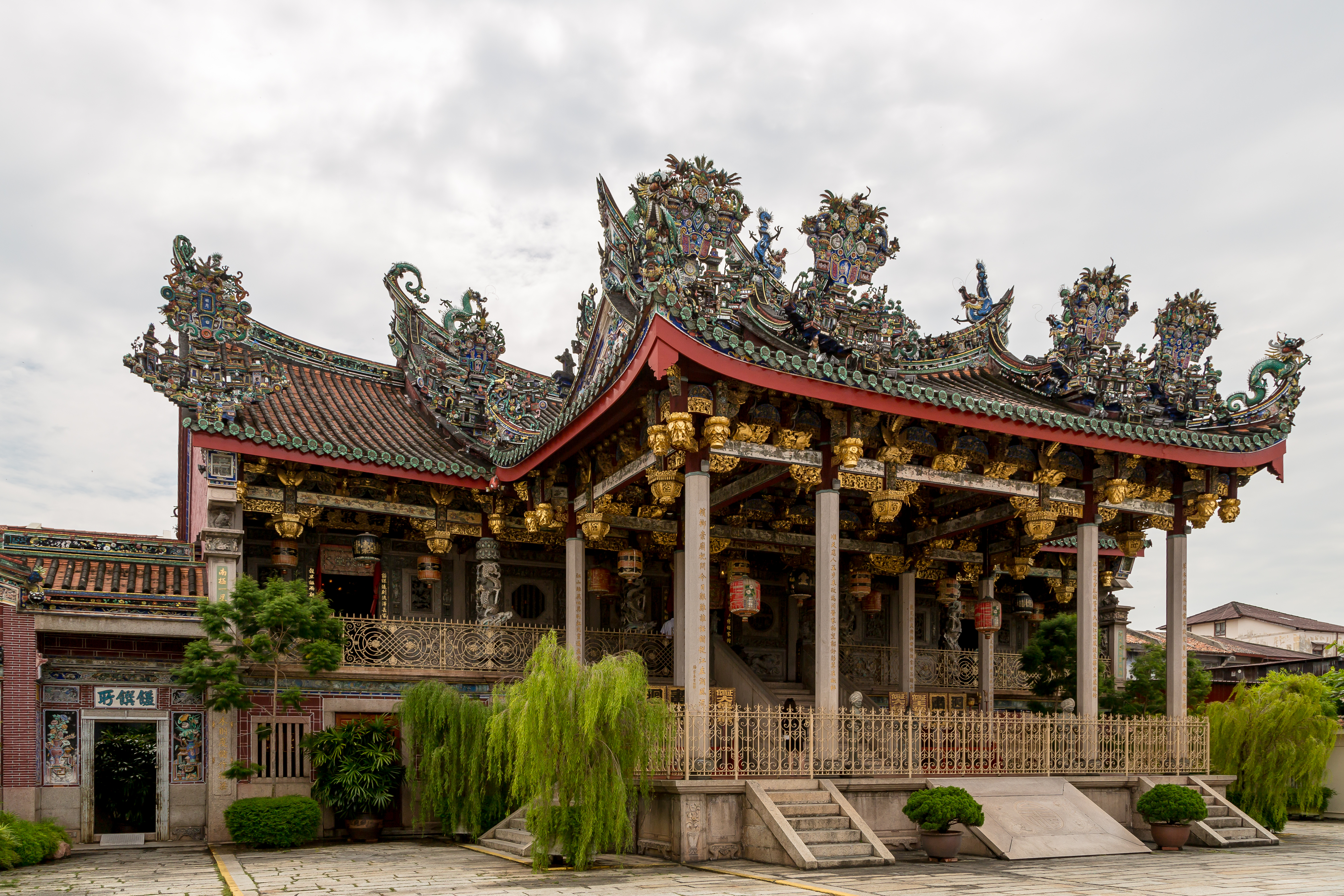
Khoo Kongsi, George Town

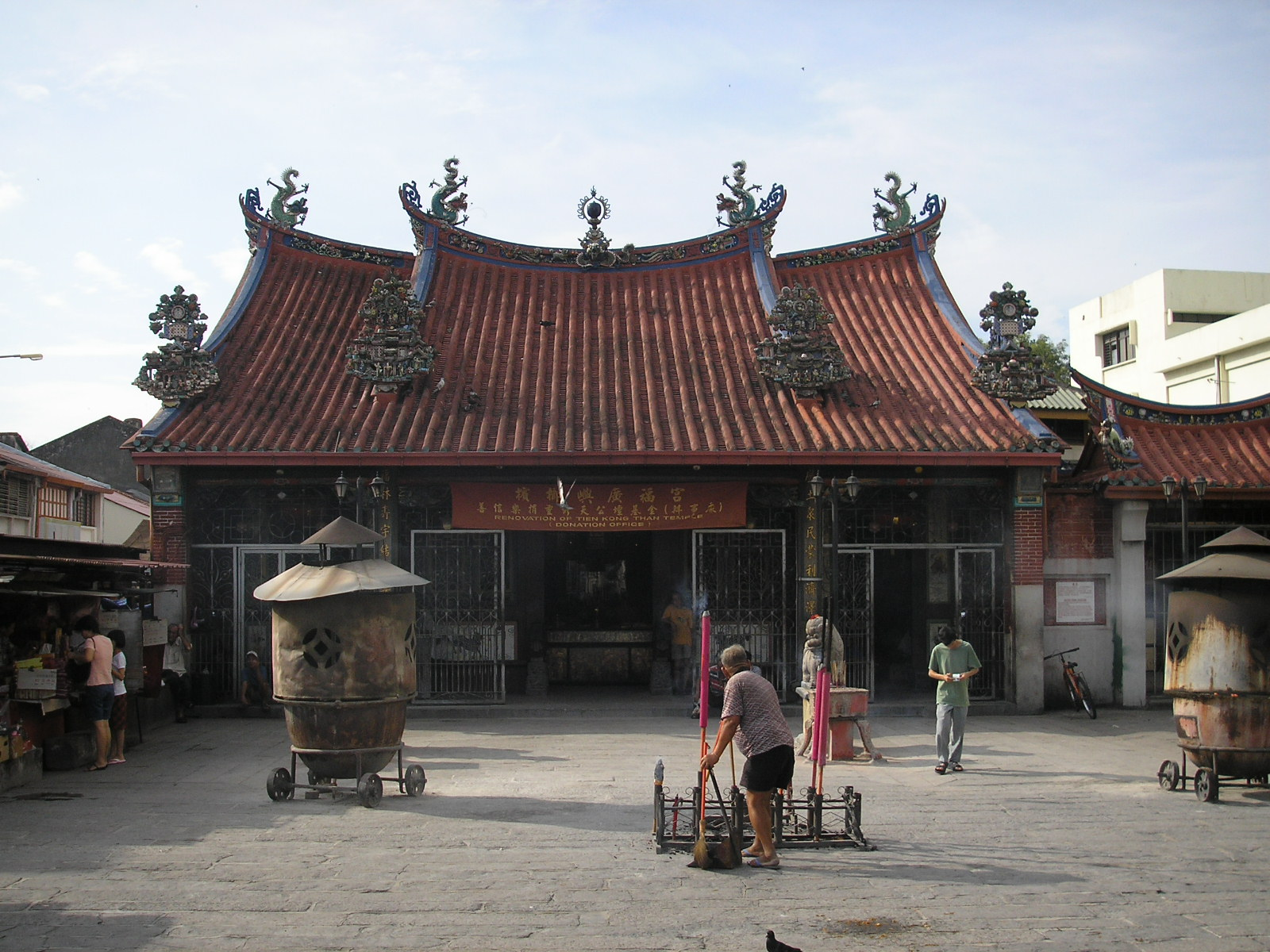
Goddess of Mercy Temple, George Town

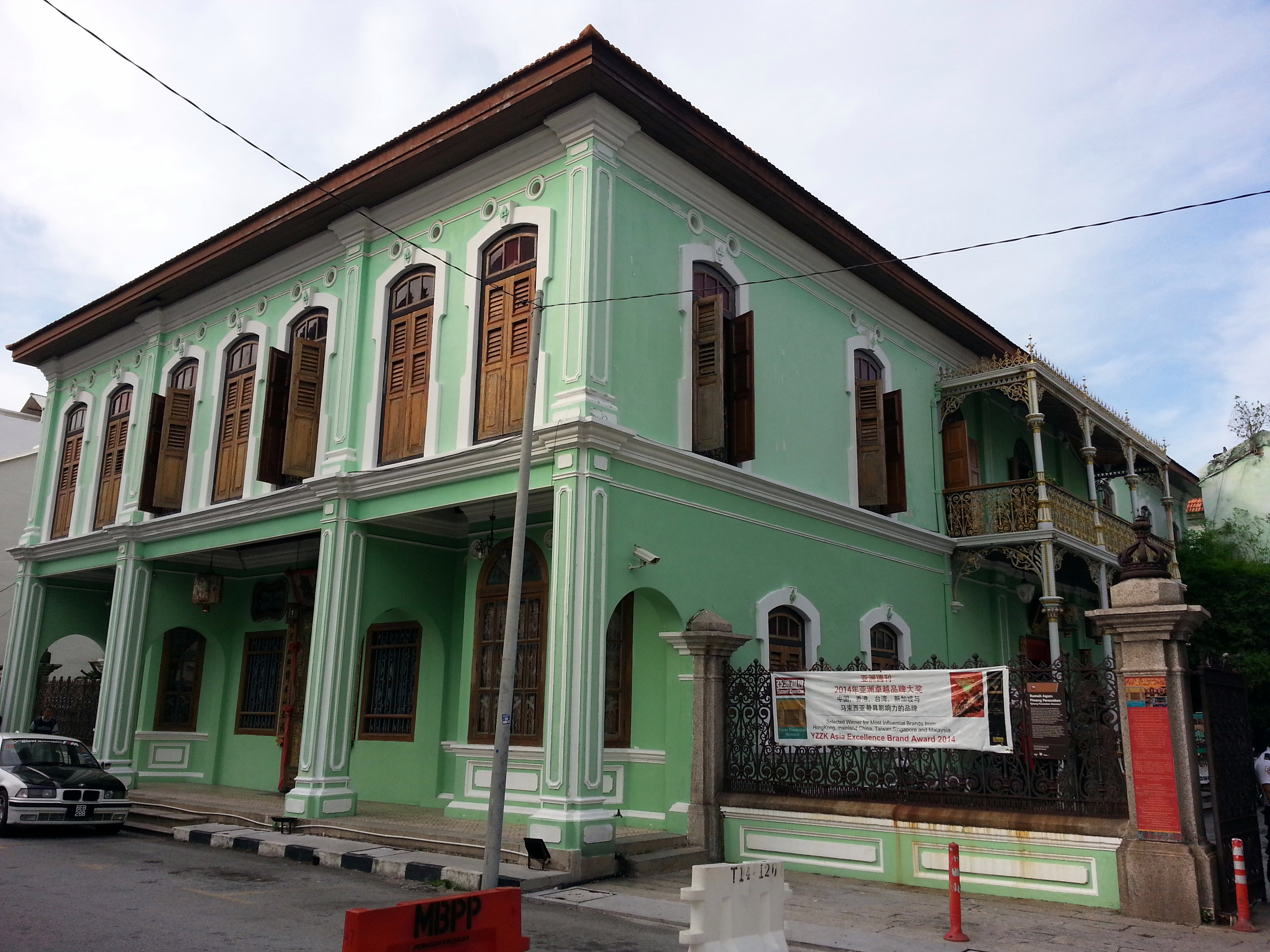
Pinang Peranakan Mansion, George Town

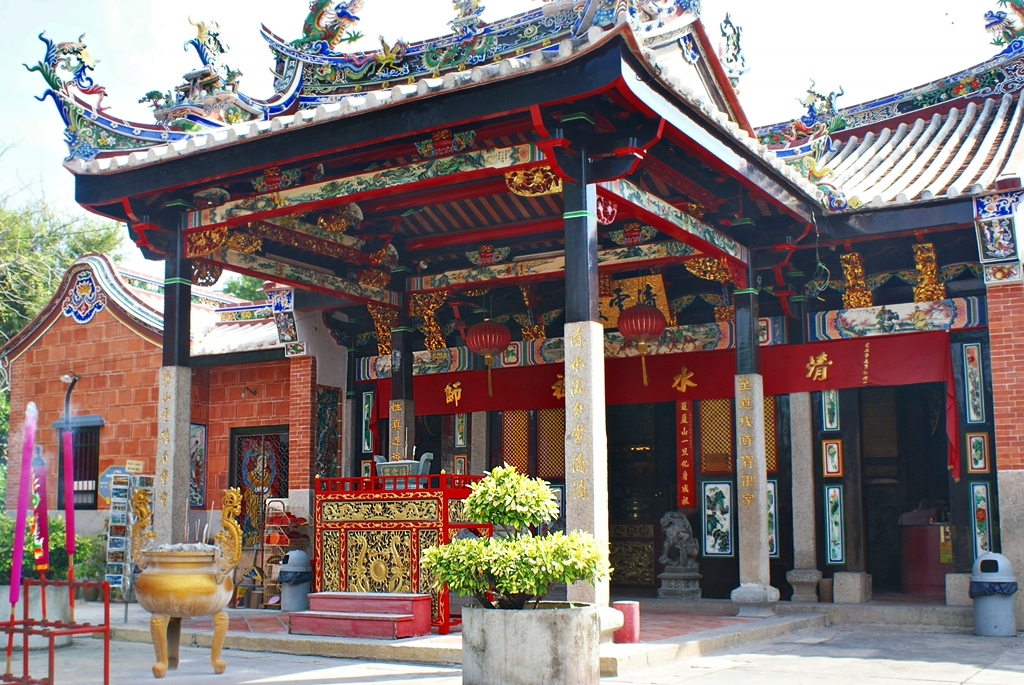
Snake Temple, Bayan Lepas

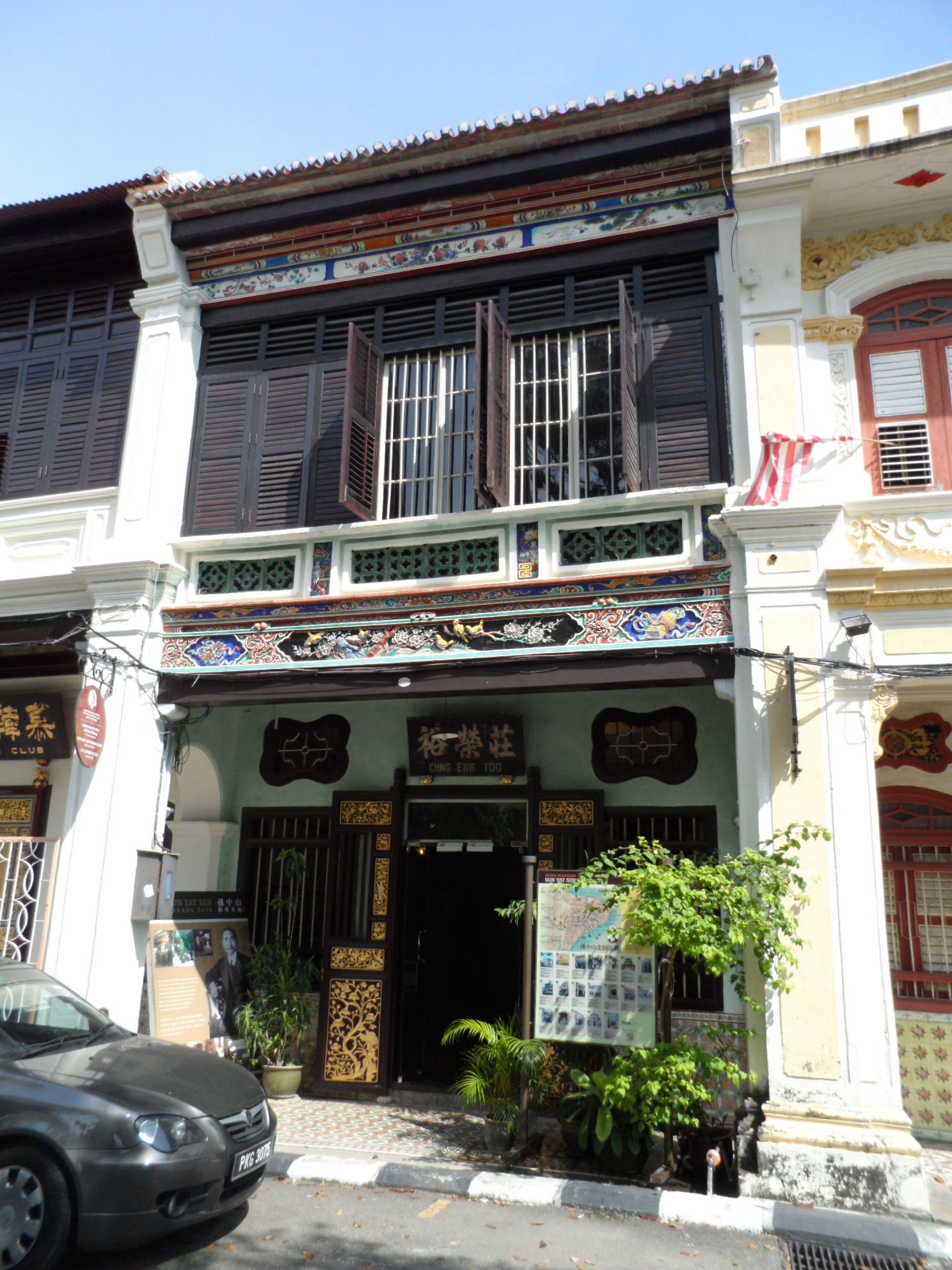
Sun Yat-sen Museum, George Town where Dr. Sun plotted his plans against the Qing dynasty

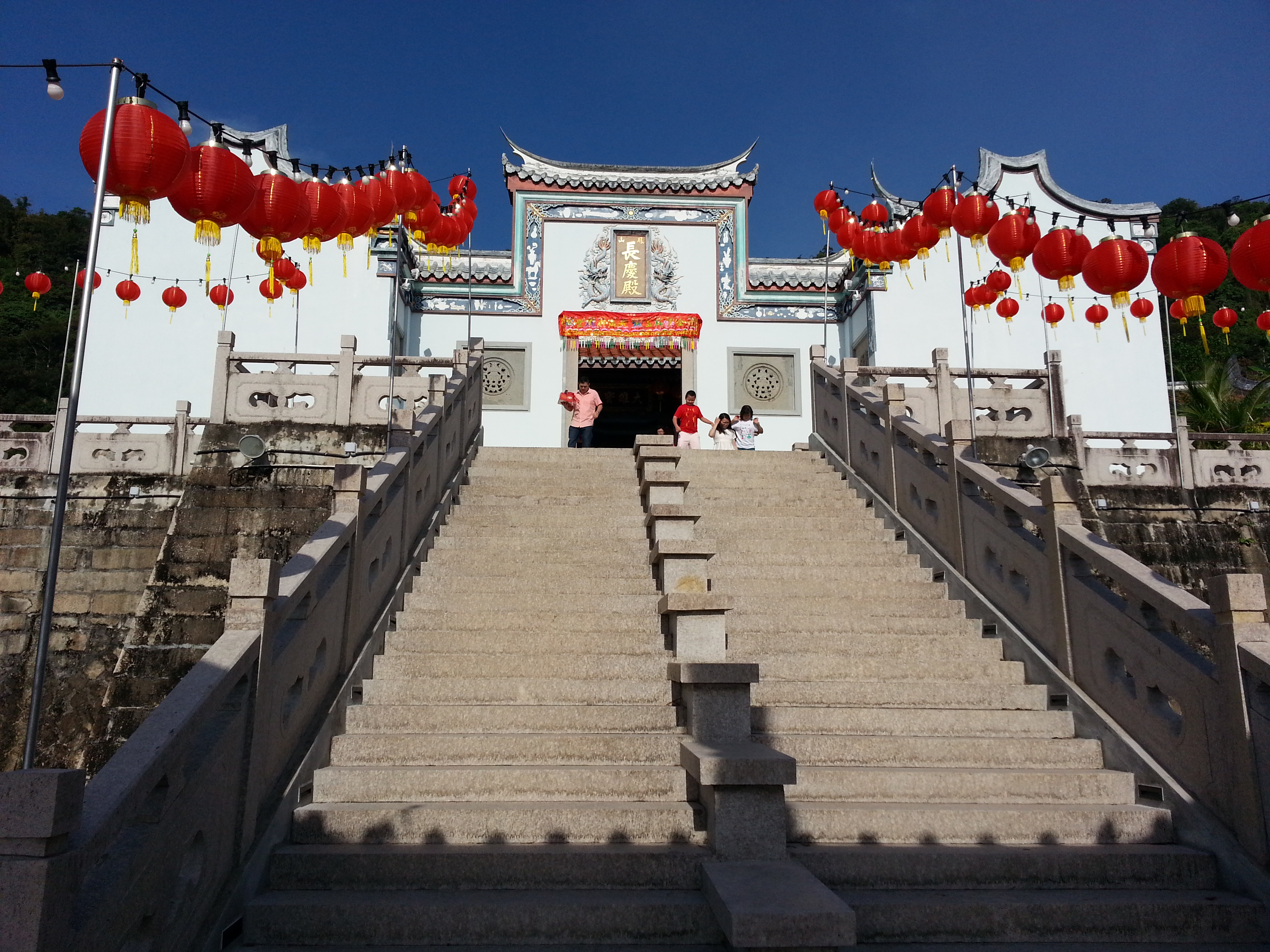
Thni Kong Tnua, Air Itam

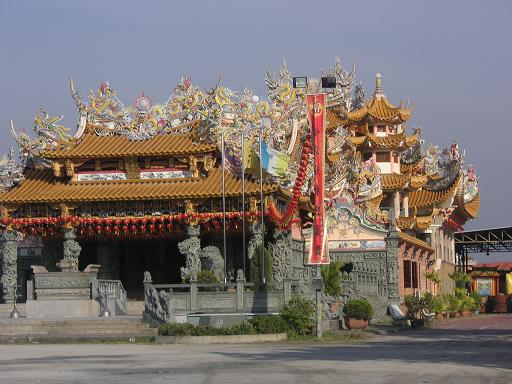
Tow Boo Kong Temple, Butterworth

== Education ==
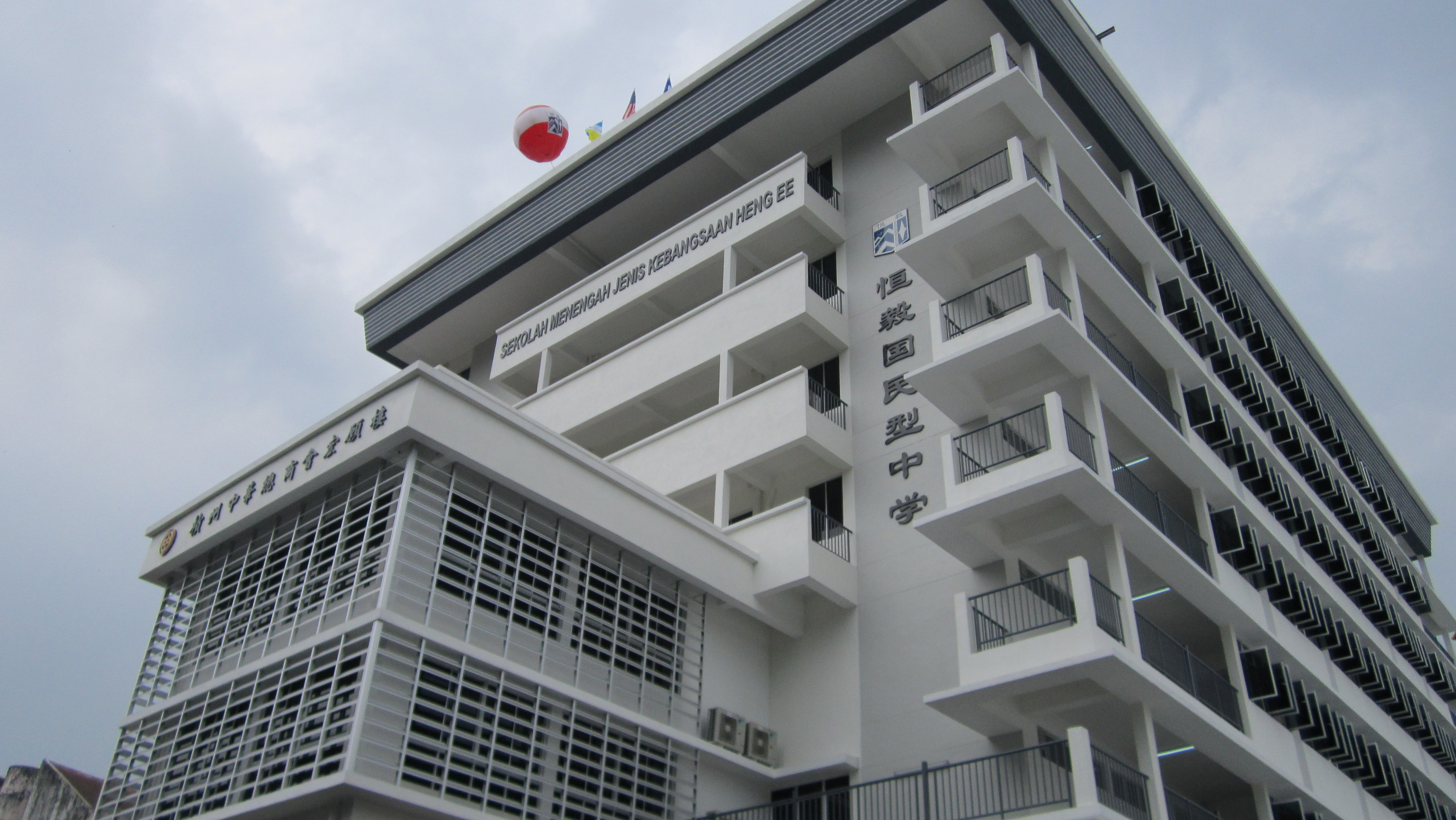
Heng Ee High School, one of the several Chinese high schools in Penang.

Most Penangite Chinese today either go to a national-type Chinese school (SMJK), chinese private high school, a national school (Sekolah Menengah Kebangsaan, or SMK) or a missionary school. In recent years, international schools, which traditionally cater to Penang's expatriate community, are also increasingly popular among Penangites themselves.

As a result, Penangite Chinese are multilingual, with the ability to converse in Malay, English and either Mandarin or another Chinese dialect (typically the individual's mother tongue). Due to the strong English education system that was established by the British in Penang, many Penangites, especially those who went to missionary schools, are able to maintain at least a reasonable command of English. Mandarin has also been increasingly used by the younger generations, as it is the medium of instruction in Chinese schools throughout the state.

=== Chinese schools ===
George Town served as the nucleus of Malaysia's Chinese education system, when in 1904, Chung Hwa Confucian High School was established. It was the first Chinese school to be built in British Malaya, as well as the first to use Mandarin as its medium of instruction.

To this day, Chinese schools in Penang maintain a reputation for academic excellence. The Chinese secondary schools in Penang, both public and private, are as listed below.

==== Public ====
- Chung Hwa Confucian High School, established in 1904, is one of the oldest formal Chinese schools in Southeast Asia. It also became the first to use Mandarin as the medium of instruction instead of other Chinese dialects.
- Chung Ling High School, founded in 1917, was the alma mater of Khaw Boon Wan, Lee Khoon Choy and Koh Tsu Koon.
- Jit Sin High School
- Penang Chinese Girls' High School
- Chung Ling Butterworth High School
- Jit Sin High School II SPS
- Union High School
- Convent Datuk Keramat High School
- Phor Tay High School, established in 1940, was the first Buddhist school in Malaysia.
- Heng Ee High School
- Sacred Heart High School

==== Private ====
- Han Chiang High School
- Chung Ling Private High School
- Jit Sin Independent High School
- Penang Chinese Girls' Private High School
- Phor Tay Private High School

== List of Penangite Chinese ==
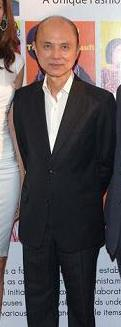
Jimmy Choo, the world-famous shoe designer.

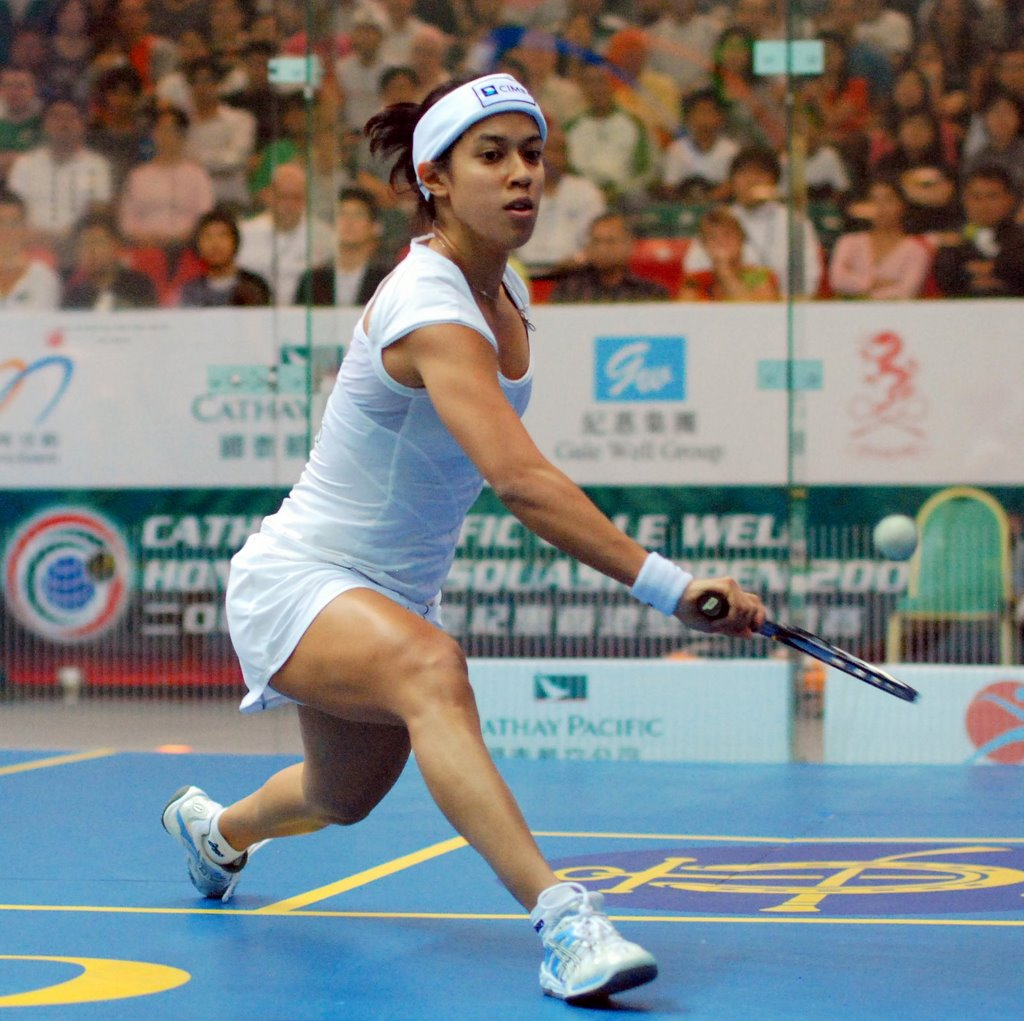
Nicol David is considered by some as the world's greatest female squash player of all time.

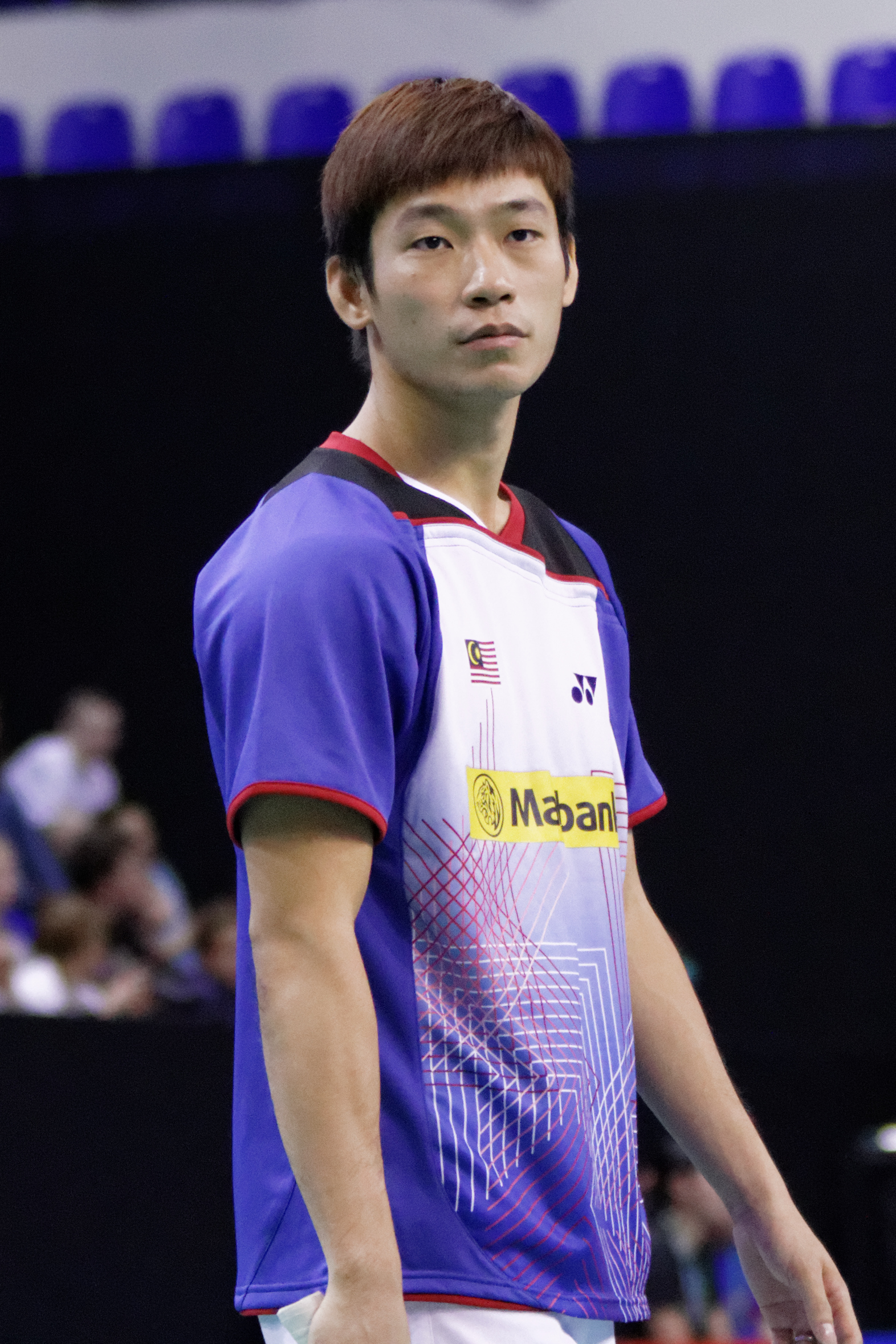
Chan Peng Soon won a silver medal as a Malaysian mixed doubles badminton player in the 2016 Rio Olympics.

The list includes Penangites of partial Chinese descent.

- Ah Niu (1976- ), singer
- Andrea Fonseka (1984- ), Miss Universe Malaysia 2004
- Chan Peng Soon (1988- ), badminton player and silver medallist in the 2016 Summer Olympics
- Chew Choon Eng (1976- ), badminton player
- Chin Eei Hui (1982- ), badminton player
- Danny Quah (1958- ), economics professor at the National University of Singapore
- David E. L. Choong (1929-2011), badminton player
- Eddy Choong (1930-2013), badminton player
- Chung Keng Quee (1821-1901), founder of Taiping; his mansion is now the Pinang Peranakan Mansion
- Chung Thye Phin (1879-1935), tin and rubber tycoon
- Zainon Chan (1923-2000), Politburo Member of the Malayan Communist Party
- Gu Hongming (1857-1928), writer
- Heah Hock Aun (1932-2014), badminton player
- Heah Joo Seang (1899-1962), politician and business leader
- Jimmy Choo (1948- ), world-renowned shoe designer
- Khaw Boon Wan (1952-), Singapore's Coordinating Minister for Infrastructure and Minister for Transport (2015- )
- Koh Lay Huan (-1826), first Kapitan China of Penang
- Koh Tsu Koon (1949- ), third Chief Minister of Penang (1990-2008)
- Law Choo Kiang (1970- ), Speaker of the Penang State Legislative Assembly (2013- )
- Eva Lee Kwok (1942- ), Canadian businesswoman
- Lim Boon Keng (1869-1957), OBE, Chinese physician
- Lim Chong Eu (1919-2010), second Chief Minister of Penang (1969-1990)
- Lim Kean Chye (1919-2023), one of the founders of the Malayan Democratic Union
- Lim Khim Wah (1989- ), badminton player
- Pik-Sen Lim (1944- ), British actress
- Loh Boon Siew (1915-1995), first Honda distributor in Malaysia
- Loh Kean Yew, Singaporean badminton player
- Loh Kean Hean, Singaporean badminton player
- Low Wee Wern (1990- ), squash player
- Angie Ng, model
- Chelsia Ng (1981- ), actress
- Irene Ng (1963- ), Singapore's Member of Parliament for Tampines (2001-2015)
- Irene Ng (1974- ), American actress
- Ng Tat Wai (1947- ), badminton player
- Nicol David (1983- ), one of the world's best female squash players of all time
- Ooi Tze Liang (1993- ), diver
- Ong Beng Hee (1980- ), squash player
- Ong Ewe Hock (1972- ), badminton player
- Ong Hock Thye (1908-1977), judge
- Saw Teong Hin (1962- ), director of You Mean the World to Me, the first Penang Hokkien film
- Saw Yi Khy (1986- ), swimmer
- Lyndel Soon (1978- ), Miss Tourism Malaysia 2001
- Hannah Tan (1981- ), actress, singer-songwriter, model and television personality
- Tan Twan Eng (1972- ), novelist
- Tee Jing Yi (1991- ), badminton player
- Toh Kar Lim (1921-2001), Central Committee Member of the Malayan Communist Party and former Commander of the 8th MNLA Regiment
- Wee Chong Jin (1917-2005), first Chief Justice of Singapore (1963-1990)
- Wong Pow Nee (1913-2002), first Chief Minister of Penang (1957-1969)
- Woo Wing Thye (1954- ), world-famous economist, and a graduate of both Yale and Harvard Universities
- Wu Lien-teh (1879-1960), Chinese doctor and a nominee for the Nobel Prize in Medicine 1935
- Yeap Chor Ee (1867-1952), businessman
- Yeohlee Teng, American fashion designer
- Yeung Kwo (1919-1956), Deputy General Secretary of the Malayan Communist Party (1947-1956)
- Ivan Yuen (1990- ), squash player

== See also ==
- Penangite Indian
