= Chung Ling Butterworth High School =

School in Butterworth, Penang, Malaysia

Chung Ling Butterworth National Type Chinese High School
- 北海锺灵国民型华文中学; Sekolah Menengah Jenis Kebangsaan Cina Chung Ling Butterworth
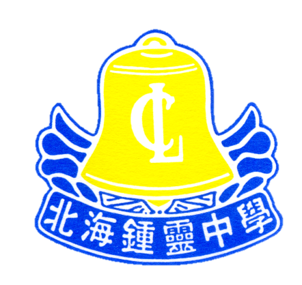

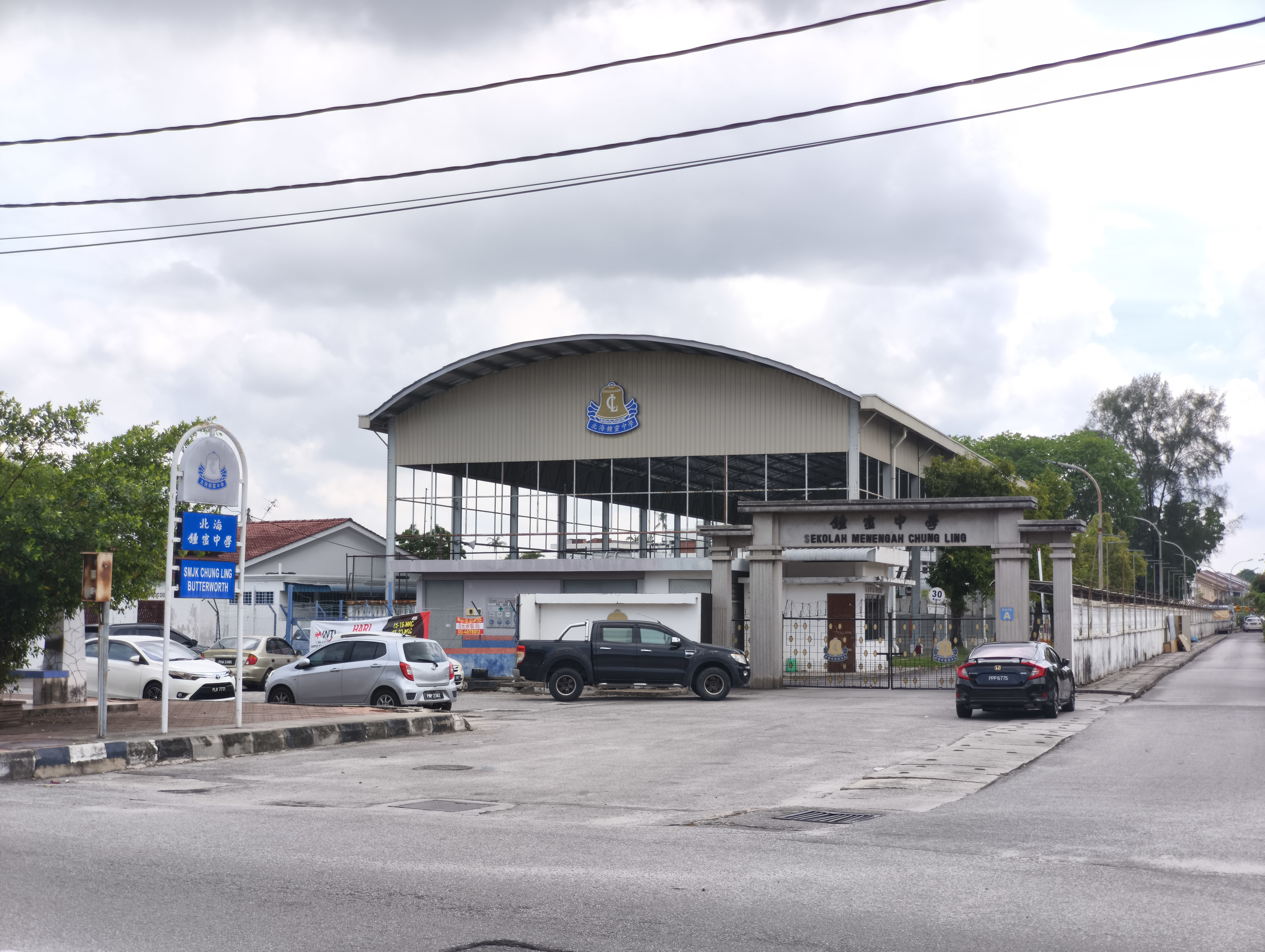
- The school's main entrance with basketball court in the background.

Location
- Jalan Ong Yi How; Butterworth, Seberang Perai, Penang; Malaysia
- 5°26′3.252″N 100°23′33.607″E

Information
- Type: National-type Chinese secondary school
- Motto: 爱吾锺灵 (Love Our Chung Ling)
- Established: 1986
- School code: PEA2056
- Principal: Mrs. Lim Lian Yolk 林莲叶校长
- Enrollment: Q4 2025 (2025)
- National ranking: Cluster School of Excellence
- Affiliations: Chung Ling High School; Chung Ling Private High School
- Website: www.clbw.edu.my

Chung Ling Butterworth National Type Chinese High School
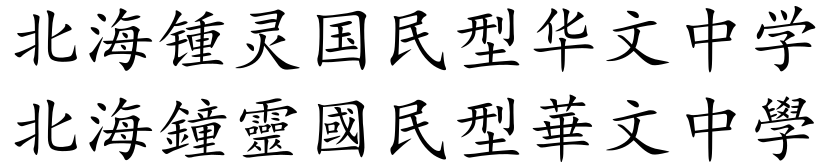
- Chung Ling Butterworth National Type Chinese High School in Simplified Chinese (top) and Traditional Chinese character (bottom)
- Traditional Chinese: 北海鍾靈國民型華文中學
- Simplified Chinese: 北海锺灵国民型华文中学
Transcriptions
Standard Mandarin
- Hanyu Pinyin: Běi Hǎi Zhōng Líng Guó Mín Xíng Huá Wén Zhōng Xué
Southern Min
- Hokkien POJ: Pak-hái Chong-lêng Kok-bîn-hêng Hôa-bûn Tiong-o̍h

Chung Ling Butterworth High School
- Traditional Chinese: 北海鍾靈中學
- Simplified Chinese: 北海锺灵中学
Transcriptions
Standard Mandarin
- Hanyu Pinyin: Běi Hǎi Zhōng Líng Zhōng Xué
Southern Min
- Hokkien POJ: Pak-hái Chong-lêng Tiong-o̍h

Chung Ling Butterworth High School, officially the Chung Ling Butterworth National Type Chinese High School (simplified Chinese: 北海锺灵国民型华文中学; traditional Chinese: 北海鍾靈国民型華文中學; Pe̍h-ōe-jī: Pak-hái Chong-lêng tiong-o̍h; Malay: Sekolah Menengah Jenis Kebangsaan Cina Chung Ling Butterworth) is a National-type Chinese secondary school in Malaysia. The Butterworth branch of Penang Chung Ling High School was established in the year of 1986 under the initiative of its Directors Board. Following the footsteps of the main school, Chung Ling Butterworth only accepts students with good grades in their Standard Six Examination (UASA).

Chung Ling Butterworth High School is one of the handful of schools that conform to the government's policy of 60–40.

== Location ==
The school is located in [Butterworth, Penang], near Jalan Ong Yi How and Raja Uda.

== History ==
The school began in 1976 when the Chung Ling Board of Directors decided to build a branch on the mainland to serve the growing Chinese community.Construction finished in 1986.The school was a branch of the historical Chung Ling High School. Established 69 years after the original school, it was built to serve the growing Chinese community in Seberang Perai.
