= Angie Ng =

Malaysian Chinese model

- Born: Angie Ng Chin Li; 1985 or 1986 (age 40–41); Penang, Malaysia
- Occupation: Model
- Modelling information
- Height: 5 ft 11.5 in (1.82 m)
- Hair colour: Black
- Eye colour: Dark Brown
- Agency: IMG Models

Angie Ng is a Malaysian Chinese model born in Penang, Malaysia.

== Early life and discovery ==
Ng was born and raised in Penang, Malaysia. She was discovered at the age of 16 by local fashion designer Michael Ong in a shopping mall in Penang. She was mentored by Cilla Foong, owner of modelling agency Cilla & Associates. Besides, she is also a trained ballet dancer till Grade 8 with Royal Academic of Dancing (RAD) and a trained tap, modern and jazz dancer with Imperial Society of Teachers of Dancing (ISTD).

== Careers ==
During the early years of Ng's career, she was based in Kuala Lumpur and quickly gained momentum in the modelling circuit working for brands like DKNY and Marc Jacobs.

Ng spent the final year of her undergraduate studies in the UK and graduated with a degree in law from the University of Reading, Berkshire at the age of 21

Ng has walked the runways afor Paul Costelloe, Alice Palmer, Lilee, Charlotte Taylor, Carlotta, Actis Barone and Jonathan Liang and closed the show for Alice Palmer in S/S '10. She also do a Kaprice Campaign. She appeared in a music video by DJ Ironik featuring Chipmunk (a remix of the song "Tiny Dancer" by Elton John).

Ng is the first Malaysian model to have modelled for Lady Gaga's designer Marko Mitanovski. In 2011 she was signed by modelling agency Model One, based in Hong Kong.

She also appeared in print ad such as American Tourister TVC- Take on the World, K11 Print Ad, Landmark Shoe Story – Fall/Winter 2012, Gap Fall 2012, Fujifilm Beauty and many more.

Ng won the FHM "Girl Next Door" competition and has subsequently graced the magazine's cover in June She was awarded the STYLO Fashion Grand Prix 'Model of The Year' title in 2010. In the summer of 2010 Ng headlined the Farah Khan S/S 2011 campaign.

She done many shows including, Max Mara, Roger Vivier, Ted Baker, Vivienne Westwood, Leonard, Furlia, Club Monaco, M.A.C and many more.

Ng appeared in several magazines such as Citabella, Asteliar Beaute Magazine, Feminine, Complexd Magazine UK, Gorgeous, NuYou Magazine, InTrend, Baccarat Magazine, GLAM, Hello Magazine, Prestige Magazine, Vision Magazine, Dewi Magazine Indonesia, New Tide, Style Magazine, Elle, Cosmopolitan HK, TVB magazine, Tao Magazine, Next magazine HK, D MAG HK, Stuff Singapore, Glass Magazine, Edelweiss Magazine Switzerland, Marie Claire HK and many others magazines.

In 2010, Ng was the cover model for the August 2010 edition of Malaysia's fashion and beauty magazine Female, D MAG, FLASH on and Elle Magazine.

For Fall 2012, she was featured in Gap Fall Icons 2012.

Ng is currently represented by IMG Models London and Model One in Hong Kong.

== Personal life ==
She has an older sister, Mabel Ng, who in 2002 was crowned Miss Malaysia World.

== Recognition ==
She was recognized as one of the BBC's 100 women of 2017.
