= Chung Ling Private High School =

High school in George Town, Malaysia

- 鍾靈獨立中學; Sekolah Menengah Persendirian Chung Ling
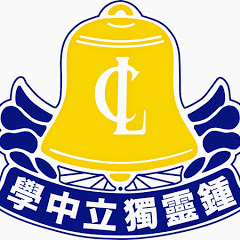

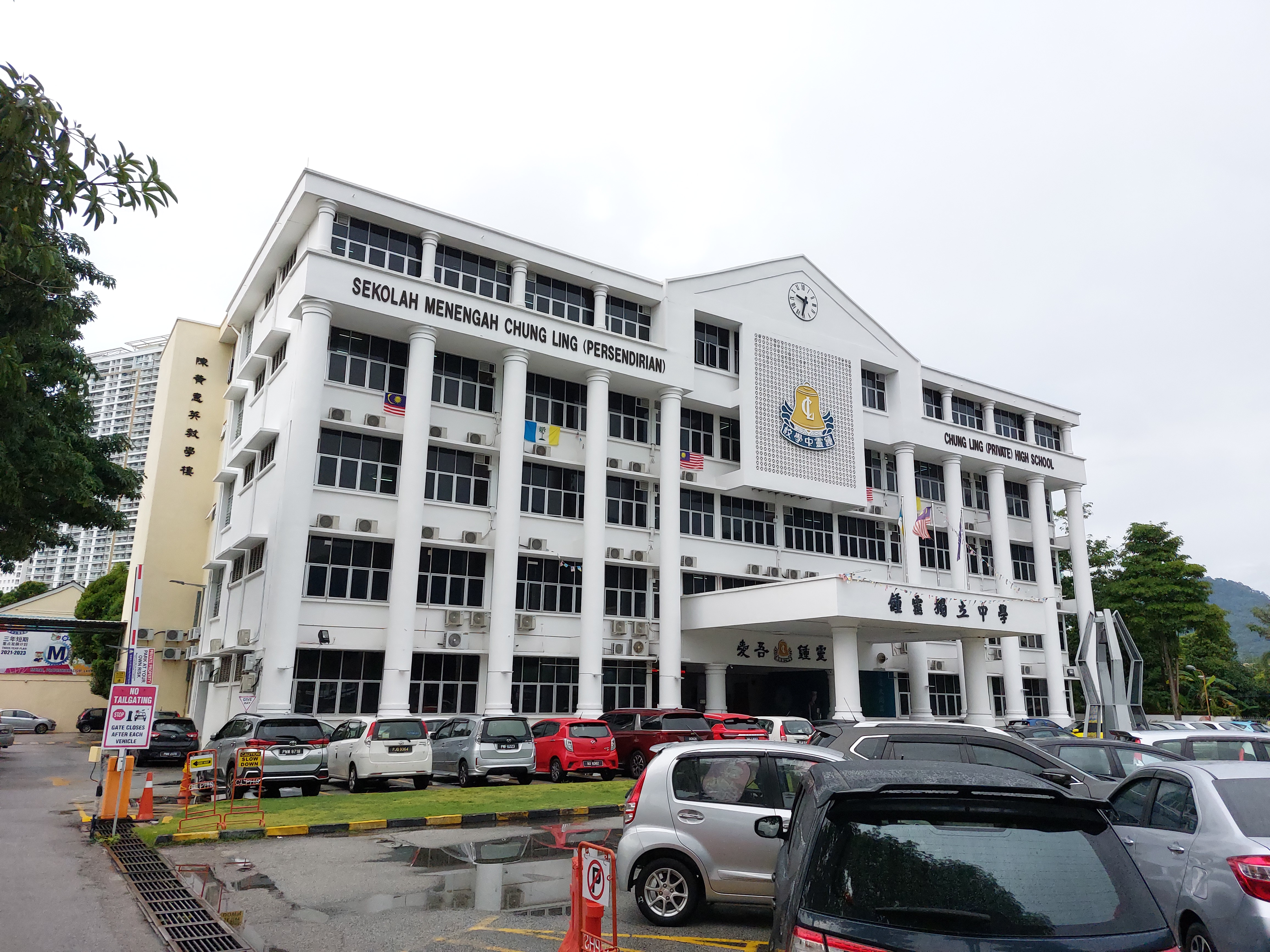

Location
- Kampung Baru; George Town, Penang; Malaysia; 5.404855°N 100.293906°E

Information
- Type: Independent School
- Motto: 爱吾锺灵 (Love Our Chung Ling)
- Established: 1962
- Principal: Ng Jooi Seah (吴维城)
- Enrollment: Up to 2000
- Colors: Dark Blue and Yellow
- National ranking: Top 5 private high schools (2015)
- Affiliations: Chung Ling High School; Chung Ling Butterworth High School
- Website: www.clphs.edu.my

Chung Ling Private High School
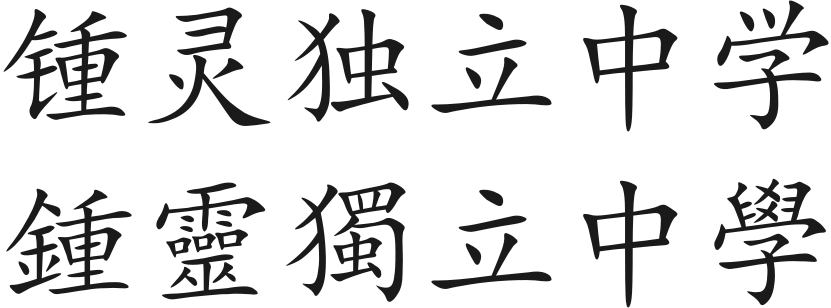
- Chung Ling Private High School in Simplified Chinese (top) and Traditional Chinese character (below)
- Traditional Chinese: 鍾靈獨立中學
- Simplified Chinese: 锺灵独立中学
Transcriptions
Standard Mandarin
- Hanyu Pinyin: Zhōnglíng Dúlì Zhōngxué
Southern Min
- Hokkien POJ: Tiong-lêng To̍k-li̍p Tiong-o̍h

Chung Ling Private High School (Malay: Sekolah Menengah Persendirian Chung Ling, simplified Chinese: 锺灵独立中学; traditional Chinese: 鍾靈獨立中學) is a Chinese independent high school in Malaysia, located in George Town, Penang. Its affiliate schools are Chung Ling High School and Chung Ling Butterworth High School.

The school was established in 1962 to provide education for students those student whose age were over the limit and those who wished to receive their education totally in their mother tongue. It is one of the 60 Chinese Independent High Schools in Malaysia. Unlike Chung Ling High School, Chung Ling Private High School provides secondary education in the Chinese language, with the medium of instruction being Mandarin using simplified Chinese characters writing.

Chung Ling Private High School is the first secondary school in South-East Asia to fully adopt Cambridge English courses. It was awarded five stars in SKIPS (the Private Education Institution Quality Standard Certificate) by the Ministry of Education (Malaysia) in 2016, and is ranked as one of the top 5 private high schools in Malaysia.
